= 1951 New Year Honours =

British royal recognitions

The 1951 New Years Honours were appointments in many of the Commonwealth realms of King George VI to various orders and honours to reward and highlight good works by citizens of those countries. They were announced on 1 January 1951 for the British Empire, Australia, New Zealand, Ceylon, and Pakistan.

The recipients of honours are displayed here as they were styled before their new honour, and arranged by honour, with classes (Knight, Knight Grand Cross, etc) and then divisions (Military, Civil, etc) as appropriate.

== British Empire ==
=== Barons ===
- Archibald Crawford. For political and public services in Leicestershire.
- Thomas Macpherson, Member of Parliament for Romford, 1945–1950. For political and public services.

=== Privy Counsellors ===
- The Honourable Sir Owen Dixon, KCMG, Justice of the High Court of the Commonwealth of Australia.
- The Right Honourable Henry Charles Ponsonby, Earl of Drogheda, KCMG, Chairman of Committees, House of Lords.
- The Right Honourable Gordon, Baron Macdonald of Gwaenysgor, KCMG , Paymaster General.

=== Knights Bachelor ===
- George William Barr, CBE, Managing Director, Fairfield Shipbuilding & Engineering Company Ltd., Glasgow.
- Percy Barter, CB, Chairman, Board of Control.
- Cecil Maurice Bowra, FBA, Professor of Poetry, University of Oxford. Warden of Wadham College.
- Eric Ashton Carpenter, OBE. For services as President, Manchester Chamber of Commerce.
- Alderman Richard Coppock, CBE ARIBA, General Secretary, National Federation of Building Trades Operatives.
- Thomas Dalling, MRCVS, Chief Veterinary Officer, Ministry of Agriculture & Fisheries.
- William Kelsey Fry, CBE MC MDS FDS MRCS, Dean of the Faculty of Dental Surgery of the Royal College of Surgeons.
- Richard Walker Haddon, CBE, Chairman, Ministry of Agriculture Publicity Advisory Committee.
- Thomas Henry Havelock, MINA FRS, Emeritus Professor of Mathematics, King's College, Newcastle upon Tyne.
- Edward Dave Asher Herbert, OBE MIMechE MIEE, Chairman, Short Bros., and Harland Ltd., Belfast.
- Christopher Hinton, MICE MIMechE, Deputy Controller of Atomic Energy (Production), Ministry of Supply.
- Gordon Morgan Holmes, CMG CBE DSc DCL MD FRCP FRS, Consulting Physician, Charing Cross Hospital and National Hospital for Nervous Diseases.
- Leonard Stanistreet Holmes, LLM JP, president of The Law Society.
- James Lythgoe, CBE, City Treasurer, Manchester.
- Desmond MacCarthy, LLD, Literary Critic.
- Andrew McCormick MacTaggart, Director, Balfour Beatty & Co. Ltd. President, Federation of Civil Engineering Contractors.
- David Hughes Parry, LLD, Professor of English Law, University of London.
- Francis Harold Peake, Controller of Death Duties, Board of Inland Revenue.
- Richard Lloyd-Roberts, CBE, Head of Personnel Management Branch, Ministry of Labour and National Service.
- William Alfred Souter. For services to the Tyne Improvement Commission.
- Henry Thirkill, CBE MC, Chairman, Cambridge University Joint Recruiting Board.
- Edwin John Venner, ACA, Member, State Management Districts Council.
- William Wallace, CBE MIMechE MINA, Vice-President and Chairman of Finance Committee, Engineering and Allied Employers' National Federation.
- William Turner Walton, MusDoc FRAM FRCM, Composer.
- Colonel Victor Dunn Warren, MBE TD JP, Lord Provost of Glasgow.
- Reginald Holmes Wilson, Comptroller, British Transport Commission.
- Harold Wooding, Chairman and Managing Director, Sudan Plantations Syndicate Ltd., and Kassala Cotton Co. Ltd.

State of South Australia

- Oscar Lionel Isaachsen, Chairman of Directors, Bank of Adelaide, State of South Australia.

State of Victoria

- The Honourable James Stanley Disney, Lord Mayor of the City of Melbourne, State of Victoria, since 1948.
- Colonel the Honourable George Victor Lansell, CMG VD, a Member of the Legislative Council of the State of Victoria since 1928. For public services.

Southern Rhodesia

- The Honourable Robert Clarkson Tredgold, CMG, Chief Justice of Southern Rhodesia.

Colonies, Protectorates etc.

- Kofaworola Adekunle Abayomi, MD ChB, Member of the Executive Council, Nigeria.
- Alport Barker, CBE, Mayor of Suva, Fiji.
- David Edwards, Colonial Legal Service, Chief Justice, Uganda.
- Charles Geoffry Shield Follows, CMG, Colonial Administrative Service, Financial Secretary, Hong Kong.
- Gerald Robert Wight. For public services in Trinidad.

=== Order of the Bath ===
==== Knights Grand Cross of the Order of the Bath (GCB) ====
Military Division

Royal Navy

- Admiral Sir Rhoderick Robert McGrigor, KCB DSO.

Army

- General Sir Sidney Chevalier Kirkman, KCB KBE MC (5084), late Royal Regiment of Artillery (now retired). Colonel Commandant, Royal Artillery.

Royal Air Force

- Air Chief Marshal Sir James Milne Robb, KCB KBE DSO DFC AFC.

Civil Division

- Sir Godfrey Herbert Ince, KCB KBE, Permanent Secretary, Ministry of Labour & National Service.

==== Knights Commander of the Order of the Bath (KCB) ====
Military Division

Royal Navy

- Vice-Admiral The Honourable Guy Herbrand Edward Russell, CB CBE DSO.
- Vice-Admiral Geoffrey Nigel Oliver, CB DSO.

Army

- Lieutenant-General Nevil Charles Dowell Brownjohn, CB CMG OBE MC (11450), late Corps of Royal Engineers.
- General Sir Frank Ernest Wallace Simpson, KBE CB DSO (15429), late Corps of Royal Engineers. Colonel Commandant, Royal Pioneer Corps.

Royal Air Force

- Air Marshal Charles Ronald Steele, CB DFC.

Civil Division

- Sir Ivone Augustine Kirkpatrick, KCMG, High Commissioner for the United Kingdom in Germany.
- Colonel Geoffry Christie-Miller, CB DSO MC TD DL, lately Chairman, County of Chester Territorial & Auxiliary Forces Association.

Additional Knight Commander

- Sir Algar Henry Stafford Howard, KCVO CB MC TD JP DL, lately Garter Principal King of Arms.

==== Companions of the Order of the Bath (CB) ====
Military Division

Royal Navy

- Rear-Admiral Dennis Marescaux Lees, DSO.
- Rear-Admiral John Arthur Symons Eccles, CBE.
- Rear-Admiral Frederick Robertson Parham, CBE DSO.
- Rear-Admiral Patrick Vivian McLaughlin, DSO.
- Rear-Admiral Royer Mylius Dick, CBE DSC.
- Rear-Admiral (E) William Scarlett Jameson, CBE.
- Acting Rear-Admiral (S) William McBride, CBE.
- Surgeon Rear-Admiral Kenneth Alexander Ingleby Mackenzie, BM BCh MRCS LRCP KHP.
- Captain Richard Oliver Bellasis, CVO, (Retired).

Army

- Brigadier (temporary) James Rupert Cochrane, CBE (33328), late Royal Regiment of Artillery.
- Major-General Nigel William Duncan, CBE DSO (12071), late Royal Armoured Corps.
- Brigadier (temporary) Alfred Francis Hely, CBE DSO TD (34589), late Royal Regiment of Artillery, Territorial Army.
- Brigadier Harold Montague Hinde, CBE (8457), late Royal Army Service Corps (now retired).
- Major-General Harold Arthur Hounsell, CBE (13149), late Royal Regiment of Artillery.
- Major-General Kenneth Frank MacKay Lewis, DSO MC (14122), late Royal Regiment of Artillery.
- Brigadier (temporary) Geoffrey Alex Colin Macnab (22973), late Infantry.
- Brigadier (temporary) Herbert Clive Phipps, DSO (13926), late Royal Regiment of Artillery.
- Brigadier (temporary) Cedric Rhys Price, CBE BA (33361), Corps of Royal Engineers.
- Major-General Arthur Charles Shortt, OBE (10886), late Corps of Royal Engineers.
- Brigadier (temporary) (now Colonel) Doidge Estcourt Taunton, DSO (27998), late Infantry.
- Major-General Thomas Young, OBE MB KHP (10380), late Royal Army Medical Corps.

Royal Air Force

- Air Vice Marshal William Arthur Darville Brook, CBE.
- Air Vice Marshal Douglas Macfadyen, CBE.
- Acting Air Vice Marshal Theodore Newman McEvoy, CBE.
- Air Commodore Charles Edward Chilton, CBE.
- Air Commodore Wilfred Leslie Freebody, CBE AFC.

Civil Division

- Herbert Wilfred Ayers, CBE, Under-Secretary and Accountant-General, Ministry of National Insurance.
- Eric Barnard, CBE DSO, Deputy Secretary, Department of Scientific & Industrial Research.
- Russell Frederick Bretherton, Under-Secretary, Board of Trade (now serving in the Cabinet Office).
- Richard William Barnes Clarke, OBE, Under-Secretary, HM Treasury.
- William Richard Joseph Cook, MSc, Chief of the Royal Naval Scientific Service, Admiralty.
- Robert Annesley Wilkinson Dent, Clerk of Public Bills, House of Commons.
- Mitchell Macdonald Dobbie, Under-Secretary, Ministry of Town & Country Planning.
- Ralph Neville Heaton, Under-Secretary, Ministry of Education.
- Charles Thomas Houghton, CBE, Under-Secretary, Ministry of Agriculture & Fisheries.
- Colonel Sir Herbert Patrick Hunter, CBE, DL, Chairman, County of Stafford Territorial & Auxiliary Forces Association.
- Andrew Lockhart Innes, Legal Secretary and Parliamentary Draftsman, Department of the Lord Advocate.
- William Francis Porter McLintock, DSc FGS, lately Director of the Geological Survey and Museum.
- Commander Seton Steuart Crichton Mitchell, OBE MIMechE, Royal Navy (Retired), Chief Engineer, Armaments Design Establishment, Ministry of Supply.
- Richard Royle Powell, CMG, Deputy Secretary, Ministry of Defence.
- Ewart Watson Ravenshear, OBE, Under-Secretary, Ministry of Fuel & Power.
- John Ross, Assistant Under-Secretary of State, Home Office.
- Sidney Donald Sargent, Director of Personnel and Accommodation, General Post Office.
- William Strath, Third Secretary, HM Treasury.
- Robert Bernard Waterer, Principal Assistant Solicitor, Board of Inland Revenue.
- Sydney Frank Wilkinson, Under-Secretary, Ministry of Health.

=== Order of Merit (OM) ===
- The Right Honourable Sir Alexander George Montagu Cadogan, GCMG KCB.
- Marshal of the Royal Air Force, the Right Honourable Hugh Montague, Viscount Trenchard, GCB GCVO DSO.

=== Order of Saint Michael and Saint George ===
==== Knights Grand Cross of the Order of St Michael and St George (GCMG) ====
- Sir Percivale Liesching, KCB KCMG, Permanent Under-Secretary of State for Commonwealth Relations, Commonwealth Relations Office.
- Sir John Stuart Macpherson, KCMG, Governor and Commander-in-Chief, Nigeria.

==== Knights Commander of the Order of St Michael and St George (KCMG) ====
- Sir Alexander Hyslop Maxwell, Chairman, British Travel and Holidays Association.
- Admiral Sir Thomas Hugh Binney, KCB DSO, Governor of the State of Tasmania.
- Sir Laurence Barton Grafftey-Smith, KBE CMG, High Commissioner in Pakistan for His Majesty's Government in the United Kingdom.
- Hugh Macintosh Foot, CMG OBE, Chief Secretary, Nigeria, Captain-General and Governor-in-Chief Designate, Jamaica.
- Alfred William Lungley Savage, CMG, Governor and Commander-in-Chief, Barbados.
- Major-General Terence Sydney Airey, CB CBE, General Officer Commanding-in-Chief, British Element, Trieste Force.
- Walter St. Clair Howland Roberts, CMG MC, His Majesty's Envoy Extraordinary and Minister Plenipotentiary at Bucharest.
- Oswald Arthur Scott, CMG DSO, His Majesty's Envoy Extraordinary and Minister Plenipotentiary, at Helsinki.

==== Companions of the Order of St Michael and St George (CMG) ====
- William Abbott, OBE PhD MIMechE, HM Inspector of Schools, Ministry of Education.
- William Asbury, lately Land Commissioner, Schleswig-Holstein, Control Commission for Germany (British Element).
- James William Blackshaw, MBE, Assistant-Secretary, Ministry of Supply.
- Wilfred John Hall, MC DSc PhD, Director of the Commonwealth Institute of Entomology.
- John Macgregor Bruce Lockhart, OBE, Principal Intelligence Officer, Control Commission for Germany (British Element).
- Kenneth McGregor, Under-Secretary, Board of Trade.
- Cyril John Pyke, Head of Finance and Economic Department, Administration of African Territories, Foreign Office.
- James Ramsay, OBE CA, British subject resident in Portugal.
- Mark Dalcour Tennant, Assistant Secretary, Ministry of Labour & National Service.
- Leonard Waight, Under-Secretary, HM Treasury.
- Clifford Craig, MD MS FRACS, Surgeon Superintendent, Launceston General Hospital, State of Tasmania.
- Ian Morrison Ross Maclennan, High Commissioner designate in Southern Rhodesia for His Majesty's Government in the United Kingdom.
- Godfrey Eccleston Boyd Shannon, an Assistant Secretary in the Commonwealth Relations Office.
- George Lowe Sutton, DSc. For services to Agriculture in the State of Western Australia.
- Robert Perceval Armitage, MBE, Colonial Administrative Service, Financial Secretary, Gold Coast.
- Richard Dennis Blandy, OBE, Colonial Administrative Service, Resident Commissioner, New Hebrides.
- Edward Arthur Carr, Colonial Administrative Service, Commissioner of the Colony, Nigeria.
- Hubert Childs, OBE, Colonial Administrative Service, Chief Commissioner of the Protectorate, Sierra Leone.
- Frederick Crawford, OBE, Colonial Administrative Service, Director of Development, Northern Rhodesia, Governor and Commander-in-Chief Designate of the Seychelles.
- William Leonard Dale, Deputy Legal Adviser to the Secretary of State for the Colonies.
- Charles Frederick Hickling, ScD, Fisheries Adviser to the Secretary of State for the Colonies.
- Norman Leslie Mayle, Assistant Secretary, Colonial Office.
- John Cochrane Muir, OBE, Colonial Agricultural Service, Member, for Agriculture and Natural Resources, Tanganyika.
- Harold James Page, OBE FRIC, Principal of the Imperial College of Tropical Agriculture, Trinidad.
- Stelios Pavlides QC, Attorney-General, Cyprus.
- Eric Ernest Falk Pretty, Colonial Administrative Service, British Resident. Brunei.
- John Wellesley Steil, MBE, Colonial Administrative Service, Secretary for African Affairs, Uganda.
- Reginald William Taylor, AMICE. Director of Public Works, Nigeria.
- Eric Arthur Cleugh, MVO OBE, His Majesty's Envoy Extraordinary and Minister Plenipotentiary to the Republic of Panama; lately Counsellor at His Majesty's Embassy in Washington.
- Ponsonby Moore Crosthwaite, Counsellor at His Majesty's Embassy at Athens.
- Alfred Stanley Fordham, Head of the American Department, Foreign Office.
- Geoffrey Warren Furlonge, OBE, Head of the Eastern Department, Foreign Office.
- George Peter Labouchère, Counsellor and Deputy Commissioner at His Majesty's Legation at Vienna; lately Counsellor of His Majesty's Embassy at Buenos Aires.
- Herbert Vere Redman, OBE, Counsellor (Information) at the United Kingdom Liaison Mission in Japan.
- Francis Brian Anthony Rundall, OBE, Inspector of His Majesty's Foreign Service Establishments.
- George Edward Russell Sandars, MBE, Governor, Blue Nile Province, Sudan.
- Frank Edmund Stafford, CBE, Colonial Administrative Service, now serving in the African Department, Foreign Office.
- Humphrey Trevelyan, CIE OBE, Deputy Economic Adviser, Control Commission for Germany (British Element), lately Counsellor at His Majesty's Embassy at Bagdad.

Honorary Companions

- Daniel Adesanya Gbelegbuwa II, CBE, Awujale of Ijebuland, Nigeria.
- Raja Uda bin Raja Muhammad, CBE, Mentri Besar of Selangor, Federation of Malaya.

=== Royal Victorian Order ===
==== Knights Commander of the Royal Victorian Order (KCVO) ====
- Daniel Thomas Davies, CVO FRCP.
- Brigadier Norman Wilmshurst Gwatkin, CVO DSO.
- Lieutenant-General Sir Gerald Robert Stedall Hickson, CB CBE DL, Royal Marines (Retired).
- Francis Hugo Teale, CVO MD FRCP.

==== Commanders of the Royal Victorian Order (CVO) ====
- Marcus John Cheke.
- Arthur Campbell Martin, FRIBA.
- George Proctor Middleton, MVO MB ChB.

==== Members of the Royal Victorian Order, 4th class (MVO) ====
- The Reverend Hector David Anderson, BD
- Captain Stanley Edward Hill, MRCVS
- Roy Murray Hyslop
- Charles William Tanner

==== Members of the Royal Victorian Order, 5th class (MVO) ====
- Robert Lindsay, BEM
- Patrick Joseph Shyne

=== Order of the British Empire ===
==== Dames Grand Cross of the Order of the British Empire (GBE) ====
Civil Division

- The Right Honourable Gertrude Mary, Baroness Denman, DBE. For services to the Women's Land Army.

==== Knights Grand Cross of the Order of the British Empire (GBE) ====
Military Division

Royal Navy

- Admiral Sir Eric James Patrick Brind, KCB CBE.

Civil Division

- The Right Honourable Samuel Lowry, Baron Porter, MBE . For services as president of the International Law Association.

==== Dames Commander of the Order of the British Empire (DBE) ====
Military Division

Army

- Brigadier Anne Thomson, CBE RRC KHNS (296473), Queen Alexandra's Royal Army Nursing Corps.

Royal Air Force

- Air Commandant Helen Wilson Cargill, RRC KHNS, Princess Mary's Royal Air Force Nursing Service.

Civil Division

- Ellen Marian Acton, CBE, Comptroller, Forces Help Society and Lord Roberts Workshops.
- Ninette de Valois, CBE , Director, Sadler's Wells Ballet.

==== Knights Commander of the Order of the British Empire (KBE) ====
Military Division

Royal Navy

- Vice-Admiral Angus Edward Malise Bontine Cunninghame-Graham, CB CBE.
- Vice-Admiral Richard Victor Symonds-Tayler, CB DSC.

Army

- Lieutenant-General Kenneth Graeme McLean, CB (15991), late Corps of Royal Engineers.

Royal Air Force

- Acting Air Marshal Thomas Arthur Warne-Browne, CB CBE DSC.

Civil Division

- Albert Edgar Feavearyear, CB , Deputy Secretary, Ministry of Food.
- Harry Mason Garner, CB FRAeS, Chief Scientist, Ministry of Supply.
- Norman Arthur Guttery, CB, Deputy Secretary, Ministry of Transport.
- James Moir Mackenzie, CMG OBE WS, Deputy Director-General, Federation of British Industries. For services to Commonwealth economic relations.
- William Edmund Hodges Rhydderch, CB, Deputy Chairman, Board of Customs & Excise.
- Arthur Elijah Trueman, FRS, Chairman, University Grants Committee.
- Lieutenant-Colonel Sir Myers Wayman, OBE JP, Vice-Chairman of the National Savings Committee.
- John Colville Hutchison, CBE, Minister at His Majesty's Embassy at Peking.
- Andrew Walker Fairley, CMG. For public services in the State of Victoria.
- Major Charles Owen Butler, CMG ED, Colonial Administrative Service, Chief Commissioner of Ashanti, Gold Coast.
- Percy Selwyn Selwyn-Clarke, CMG MC MD BS FRCP MRCS, Governor and Commander-in-Chief of the Seychelles.
- Harold Frederick Downie, CMG OBE, one of the Crown Agents for the Colonies.

Honorary Knight Commander

- Francis Akanu Ibiam, OBE MB ChB, Member of the Executive Council, Nigeria.

==== Commanders of the Order of the British Empire (CBE) ====
Military Division

Royal Navy

- Captain (Commodore Second Class) Leslie Newton Brownfield.
- Captain Cyril William Byas, (Retired).
- Captain (S) Eric Denison Thorngate Churcher.
- Captain Henry Bramhall Ellison, DSO, lately on loan to the Government of India as Commodore Second Class.
- Rear-Admiral (E) Hubert Southwood Harrison, DSC.
- Colonel John Chaddesley Westall, Royal Marines.
- Surgeon Captain (D) Frank Reginald Parry Williams, OBE FDSRCS BDS KHDS.

Army

- Brigadier Edwin Raymond Ash, MIMechE (42159), Royal Electrical & Mechanical Engineers.
- Brigadier Oswald Emerson Chapman, MIMechE (15591), late Royal Armoured Corps.
- Colonel (temporary) Rohan Delacombe, DSO MBE (34748), The Royal Scots (The Royal Regiment).
- Colonel (temporary) Percy Douglas Fabin, MBE (26854), Employed List (late The Loyal Regiment (North Lancashire)).
- Brigadier John Victor Faviell, OBE MC (13145), late Infantry, (now retired).
- Colonel (acting) Cecil Walter Fort, MBE MC (272769), Army Cadet Force.
- Colonel Elspeth Isabel Weatherly Hobkirk (196046), Women's Royal Army Corps.
- Brigadier Wilfrid Gould Pidsley, DSO OBE MC (27386), late Royal Army Educational Corps.
- Brigadier (acting) Derek Mills-Roberts, DSO MC (69334), Territorial Army.
- Brigadier (temporary) Albert Smith, OBE TD ADC (25252), late Royal Regiment of Artillery, Territorial Army.
- Colonel (temporary) Norman George Archie Ireland-Smith (40390), Royal Army Ordnance Corps.
- Colonel Samuel Hamilton Woods, OBE FDS KHDS (5446), late Royal Army Dental Corps.

Royal Air Force

- Air Vice Marshal Percy Eric Maitland, CB MVO AFC, (Retired).
- Air Commodore Vyvyan Stewart Ewing, MB ChB DPH.
- Air Commodore Philip Jones.
- Air Commodore William Alfred Opie.
- Air Commodore Leonard Taylor.
- Group Captain Graham Clarke Bladon.
- Group Captain Edward John Corbally.
- Group Captain Edward James Laine, DFC.
- Group Captain Kenneth John McIntyre, OBE.
- Group Captain Howard Wright Penney.

Civil Division

- David Dick Anderson, MC, HM Chief Inspector of Schools, Scottish Education Department.
- Lieutenant-Colonel Michael Picton Ansell, DSO, Chairman, British Show Jumping Association.
- William Armstrong. For services to the Playhouse, Liverpool, and to the Birmingham Repertory Theatre.
- Henry Ashton Ashton, Deputy Regional Director, North Western Region, General Post Office.
- Stanley Bertram Bagley,, Chairman and Joint Governing Director, Bagley & Co. Ltd.
- Dennis William Barrett, Director and General Manager, Smiths English Clocks Ltd. Chairman of the British Clock & Watch Manufacturers Association.
- Karl Baumann, MIMechE. For services to turbine development.
- Gerald Clayton Beadle, Controller, West Region, British Broadcasting Corporation.
- Edgar Charles Behrens, OBE JP, Chairman, National Wool Textile Export Corporation. Director of Sir Jacob Behrens & Sons Ltd., Bradford.
- Henry Berry, MIMechE, Member of Parliament for Woolwich West, 1945–1950. For political and public services.
- George Herbert Bowler, OBE, Ministry of Pensions Representative in North America.
- James Boyd, MD FRCP(I), Chief Medical Officer, Ministry of Health & Local Government, Northern Ireland.
- Arthur Brandram, OBE, Secretary, The United Services Trustee.
- Hermann Justus Braunholtz, Keeper of the Department of Ethnography, British Museum.
- The Honourable John Hamilton Bruce, JP DL, Principal Secretary of the Priory for Wales, Order of St. John of Jerusalem and Commissioner for Wales, St. John Ambulance Brigade.
- Herbert Bruckshaw, OBE ACA, Accountant General, Ministry of Supply.
- Clarkson Leo Burgess, Clerk of the Peace for the County of London.
- Egerton St. John Pettifor Catchpool, Founder and lately General Secretary, Youth Hostels Association.
- Cecil Harry Chester, OBE MIMechE, Chairman South Western Gas Board.
- Daniel Norman Chester. For services to the study of public administration. Fellow of Nuffield College, Oxford.
- Stephen Edgar Chisholm, Assistant Comptroller, Patent Office.
- Henry William Coleman, OBE, Chief Officer, Birmingham Fire Brigade.
- Hayne Constant, MIMechE FRAeS FRS, Director, National Gas Turbine Establishment, Ministry of Supply.
- Cicely Courtneidge (Cicely Esmeralda Hulbert), Actress.
- Frank Henry Crosier, OBE ASAA, Deputy General Manager, Navy, Army and Air Force Institutes.
- Joan Cross, Singer.
- Stanley Kenneth Davies, Chairman, Welsh Advisory Council for Civil Aviation.
- Frederic Rudolf Mackley De Paula, OBE FCA. For services to the Board of Inland Revenue.
- Major Cecil Randolph Dudgeon, Chief Food Officer for Scotland, Ministry of Food.
- John Dunlop, Town Clerk of Belfast.
- Oscar Faber, OBE DCL DSc MICE, Senior Partner, Oscar Faber & Partners. For services in the rebuilding of the House of Commons.
- Frank Ludford Freeman, Chief Education Officer, Southampton.
- James Blair Frizell, Director of Education for the City of Edinburgh.
- Donald Evelyn Edward Gibson, ARIBA, City Architect and Town Planning Officer, Coventry.
- Sir (Ernest) Basil Gibson, JP, Chairman, Sheffield Regional Hospital Board.
- Lionel Giles, DLitt. For services to the study of the Chinese language and its literature.
- Robert Gillespie, Managing Director, British Tanker Company Ltd.
- Victor Andrew Goddard, OBE. For services as Chief of Establishments and Organisation Division, Control Commission for Germany, British Element.
- Archibald Hayman Robertson Goldie, DSc, Deputy Director (Research), Meteorological Office, Air Ministry.
- Mary Lynda Dorothea Grier, lately Representative in China for the British Council.
- Sidney Aaron Griller, FRAM, Leader of the Griller String Quartet.
- Walter Henry Guillebaud, Deputy Director General, Forestry Commission.
- John Ernest Gwyther, MBE, Deputy Secretary, Exchequer and Audit Department.
- Ralph William Hill, MA JP, Headmaster, Dorchester Grammar School, Dorset.
- William Bowyer Honey, lately Keeper, Victoria & Albert Museum.
- Joseph Stanley Hopwood, MB BS MRCS LRCP, Medical Superintendent, Broadmoor Institution.
- Robert Willis Horton, JP, lately Chairman of the Wiltshire Agriculture Executive Committee.
- Major-General Ivor Thomas Percival Hughes, CB DSO MC DL, Deputy Serjeant at Arms, House of Commons.
- Robert Moore Hunter, Assistant Secretary, Ministry of Works.
- Richard Irvin, Alderman, Tynemouth County Borough Council.
- Philip Brutton James, Art Director, Arts Council of Great Britain.
- Charles Johnson, FBA FSA, for eminent services to Medieval research.
- John Cyril Jones, MIMechE AMICE, Director of Education, The Polytechnic, Regent Street, London.
- William Sydney Jones, Chief Registrar, Chancery Division, Supreme Court of Judicature.
- John Lucien Keith, OBE, Assistant Secretary, Colonial Office.
- Charles Kemp, United Kingdom Trade Commissioner (Grade I), Johannesburg.
- Peter James Kerley, MD FRCP, Director, Radiological Department, Westminster Hospital. Adviser on Mass Radiography, Ministry of Health.
- Ernest Charles Kitts, Assistant Secretary, Air Ministry.
- John William Laing, Governing Director, John Laing & Son Ltd., Mill Hill.
- Lieutenant-Colonel Charles Gordon Larking, FCA JP, lately Chairman, National Executive Council, British Legion.
- Charles Boyd McAlpine, Assistant Secretary, Ministry of Labour & National Service.
- Lionel Roy McColvin, Librarian to the City of Westminster, and Honorary Secretary of the Library Association.
- Charles John Macdonald, OBE, Assistant Secretary, Ministry of Transport.
- George Tait McGlashan, JP, Convener of Perth and Kinross.
- Geoffrey Marshall, OBE MD FRCP, Principal Medical Referee to the Civil Service Commission.
- Charles Carnegie Martin, Chief Constable of Liverpool.
- Peter Haig Muirhead, Director and General Manager, Vickers-Armstrongs Ltd., Newcastle upon Tyne.
- Charles Norman, Chairman, Animal Feeding Stuffs C.I.F. Buyers Association of London Ltd.
- William Leslie Maurice O'Connor, Director of Carbonisation, National Coal Board.
- Tom Paterson Owens, Chief Inspector, Children's Branch, Home Office.
- Charles Ranken Bruce Park, Inspector General of Companies, Companies Liquidation and Bankruptcy Department, Board of Trade.
- John Seymour Pearce, MBE MC, Regional Controller, Ministry of National Insurance.
- Solomon Pearce. For political and public services in Leeds.
- Samuel Frederick Peshall, MC, Chairman, North Midlands Regional Board for Industry.
- Bernard Frank Pool, OBE, Director of Contracts, Admiralty.
- Maurice Ernest Reed, MBE. For services as Legal Secretary, Law Officers' Department.
- Harold Taylor Robinson, Vice-Chairman, Derby Local Employment Committee.
- William Alexander Ross, OBE FRIBA, Director of Works & Services, Scotland, Ministry of Works.
- George Herbert Russell. For public and agricultural services in Angus and Kincardine.
- Reginald John Samuel, MICE, Deputy Chief Engineer, Roads Department, Ministry of Transport.
- Eric Sanders, Managing Director, Helli-Wells Ltd., Walsall, and Treforest Trading Estate, Pontypridd.
- Siegfried Loraine Sassoon, MC DLitt, Author and poet.
- Hilary Aidan St. George Saunders, MC, Author.
- Adrian Gilbert Scott, MC FRIBA, Architect. For services in the rebuilding of the House of Commons.
- John James Stawell Scouler, Director of Dried Fruits & Edible Nuts Division, Ministry of Food.
- Stephen John Secker, Accountant General, German Section, Foreign Office.
- John Edward Serby, FRAeS, Deputy Director, Royal Aircraft Establishment, Farnborough.
- Professor Arnold Nixon Shimmin, Member, National Arbitration Tribunal.
- Colonel the Honourable Cyril Davenport Siddeley, TD DL, Chairman, Coventry Local Employment Committee.
- Stanley Livingston Smith, DSc MICE MIMechE MINA MIMarE, Director of Research of the British Shipbuilding Research Association.
- Bernard Morrell Stephenson, Assistant Solicitor, Department of HM Procurator General and Treasury Solicitor.
- Richard William Trumper, FRICS, Senior Partner in the firm of Messrs. Glutton, Agents for the Commissioners of Crown Lands.
- Alwyn Ieuan Tudor, MBE, Assistant Secretary, Home Office.
- James Nixon Waite, MIEE, Controller, London Division, British Electricity Authority.
- William Watson, Secretary, Shipbuilding Employers Federation.
- Alderman Charles Frederick White, JP, Member of Parliament for West Derbyshire, 1944–1950. For political and public services.
- Harold Ray Whiteman, Controller, London and South Eastern Region, Ministry of Labour & National Service.
- Frank Whittle, Assistant Secretary, War Office.
- Vincent Brian Wigglesworth, MD BCh FRS, Director of the Unit of Insect Physiology, Agricultural Research Council.
- Herbert Sydney Wilcox, Film Producer and Director.
- Henry Wilkinson, Controller of Supplies, Ministry of Health.
- Octavius George Willey, MP, Member of Parliament for the Cleveland Division of the North Riding of Yorkshire since 1945. For political and public services.
- Olive Christine, Lady Willis. For services to the welfare of wives and families of officers and ratings in the Royal Navy.
- Robert Yates, DSO MC MIMinE, Deputy Chief Inspector of Mines, Ministry of Fuel and Power.
- Thomas Yates, General Secretary, National Union of Seamen.

Overseas and Diplomatic list

- Alexander Brackenridge, President of the British Commonwealth Chamber of Commerce, New York.
- John Percival Coghill, His Majesty's Consul-General at Canton.
- Howard Mercer, MC DFC, Chief Secretary, British Administration, Tripolitania.
- William Robertson Myers, Deputy Inspector-General of Customs at Shanghai, Chinese Maritime Customs Service.
- Judge Michael Harvey Rafferty, lately British Judge of the Mixed Tribunal, International Court, Tangier.
- John Francis Robert Vaughan-Russell, His Majesty's Consul-General at Buenos Aires.
- The Right Reverend Weston Henry Stewart, DD, Bishop of the Church of England in Jerusalem.
- Lucy Meredith Bryce, MB BS FRACP, Honorary Director of the Blood Transfusion Service in the State of Victoria.
- William Ayliff Godlonton, OBE. For public services in Southern Rhodesia.
- William Forbes Mackenzie, OBE, Deputy Resident Commissioner, Swaziland.
- Paul McGuire, an author and lecturer of the State of South Australia.
- Frank Gladstone Menzies, Crown Solicitor, State of Victoria.
- James Henry Methold, President, United Kingdom Citizens Association, India.
- Joseph Franklin Thorn, a mining engineer. For services to the gold-mining industry in the State of Western Australia.
- Kamil Mohamed Ariff bin Kadir Mustan, LMS. For public services in the Federation of Malaya.
- Lancelot Liddle Rorke Buckland, MICE, lately Executive Officer, Development, Tanganyika.
- John Campbell. For public services in Kenya.
- Patrick Albert Courtney, Colonial Postal Service, Director, Posts & Telegraphs Department, Nigeria.
- Nicholas Bayard Dill. For public services in Bermuda.
- William John Donnelly, lately Commissioner of Income Tax, Northern Rhodesia.
- Garnet Hamilton Gordon, OBE. For public services in the Windward Islands.
- Richard Geoffrey Dennison Houghton, lately Commissioner of Labour, Federation of Malaya.
- Ronald Macdonald, OBE MC, Colonial Audit Service, Director of Audit, Federation of Malaya and Singapore.
- Adam Rankine, MC MB ChB, lately Colonial Medical Service, Director of Medical Services, Mauritius.
- William Harold Salkield, MInstT, General Manager and Harbour Authority, Gold Coast Railway.
- Tan Chin Tuan. For public services in Singapore.
- Captain Arthur Frederick Thelwell, OBE, lately Commissioner of Lands, Jamaica.

Honorary Commander

- Sheikh Seif bin Ali El-Bually, OBE, State Secretary to the Government of Mukalla, Aden.

==== Officers of the Order of the British Empire (OBE) ====
Military Division

Royal Navy

- Captain Robert Syme Denholm Armour, (Retired).
- Acting Captain (S) Gerald Horace Ashby.
- Lieutenant-Colonel Reginald Clifford Bullock, Royal Marines.
- Commander Sidney Arthur Moorhouse Else.
- Major (War Substantive Lieutenant-Colonel) George Robert Hawkins, Royal Marines (Retired).
- Commander (E) Guy Cedric Hoffman, AMIMechE.
- Commander (E) Frederick Albert Cyprian Jeans.
- Commander Horace Rochfort Law, DSC.
- Engineer Captain George Leonard Maclennan, (Retired).
- The Reverend William John Ernest Piggott, Chaplain.
- Commander Geoffrey Anthony Corry Williams, (Retired).

Army

- Lieutenant-Colonel (temporary) George Sidney Alexander (86049), Royal Army Ordnance Corps.
- Lieutenant-Colonel (District Officer) Alfred Ernest Ball, MBE (51842), Royal Regiment of Artillery.
- Lieutenant-Colonel (temporary) Edward John Hunter Bates, MC (53108), Royal Regiment of Artillery.
- Lieutenant-Colonel Adam Johnstone Cheyne Block, DSO (39141), Royal Regiment of Artillery.
- Lieutenant-Colonel Arthur Carr (50233), 5th Royal Inniskilling Dragoon Guards, Royal Armoured Corps.
- Lieutenant-Colonel (temporary) James Caesar Cashin (139427), Corps of Royal Engineers.
- The Reverend Percy William Frederick Cato (87102), Chaplain to the Forces, Second Class (temporary), Royal Army Chaplains' Department.
- Lieutenant-Colonel Olive Emily Clark, RRC (206063), Queen Alexandra's Royal Army Nursing Corps.
- Lieutenant-Colonel (temporary) Charles Ernest Weir Dalton (68934), Corps of Royal Electrical & Mechanical Engineers.
- Major (Quartermaster) Albert Frederick Day, MBE (89101), Corps of Royal Engineers (seconded to Extra Regimentally Employed List).
- Lieutenant-Colonel (Quartermaster) Percy Samuel Dundon, MBE (76791), Royal Army Service Corps (seconded to Extra Regimentally Employed List).
- Lieutenant-Colonel Jack Eaton (56749), Royal Army Ordnance Corps.
- Lieutenant-Colonel Denis Henry Fitzgerald, DSO (50869), Irish Guards.
- Lieutenant-Colonel (acting) John Robert Frost, TD (40889), Combined Cadet Force.
- Lieutenant-Colonel (acting) Thomas Howe Fry, MM (275715), Army Cadet Force.
- Lieutenant-Colonel William Alfred Hardy, AMIMechE (72939), Corps of Royal Electrical & Mechanical Engineers.
- Lieutenant-Colonel (temporary) Neil Frederick Heneage (56613), Royal Regiment of Artillery.
- Colonel (temporary) Christopher Francis Hutt (40389), Royal Regiment of Artillery.
- Lieutenant-Colonel Harold Bryan Jolly, TD (31994), Royal Regiment of Artillery, Territorial Army.
- lieutenant-Colonel (temporary) Geoffrey Franklin Lushington (41141), Royal Regiment of Artillery.
- Lieutenant-Colonel (temporary) John Alistair Manifold (70111), Royal Army Medical Corps.
- Lieutenant-Colonel (temporary) (now Major (Ordnance Executive Officer)) Bernard McCormack, (123858), Royal Army Ordnance Corps.
- Lieutenant-Colonel Wilfred John Potter (56724), Royal Army Service Corps.
- Lieutenant-Colonel (temporary) Robert Caradoc Rose Price, DSO (50915), Welsh Guards.
- Lieutenant-Colonel Thomas Henry Pritchard, MC TD (21589), Corps of Royal Engineers, Territorial Army.
- Lieutenant-Colonel (now Colonel (temporary) and Chief Paymaster) Vivian Wellesley Rees (6056), Royal Army Pay Corps.
- Lieutenant-Colonel (temporary) John Richard Hugh Robertson, MA (53649), Corps of Royal Engineers.
- Major John Henry Sharpley, MBE (74431), The Cheshire Regiment.
- Lieutenant-Colonel Charles Newbigging Thomson, DSO TD (36839), The Black Watch (Royal Highland Regiment), Territorial Army.
- Lieutenant-Colonel Maxwell Richard Julian Hope-Thomson, DSO MC (52731), The Royal Scots Fusiliers.
- Lieutenant-Colonel (temporary) Harold Denis Edwards Verschoyle (6426), The Royal Inniskilling Fusiliers.
- Lieutenant-Colonel (Quartermaster) George Hedley Watson, MC TD (33594), The East Yorkshire Regiment (The Duke of York's Own), Territorial Army.
- Lieutenant-Colonel Dudley Somerset Erskine West, MC, (30705), The Cheshire Regiment.
- Lieutenant-Colonel Roy Harold Willis, TD (19992), Royal Regiment of Artillery, Territorial Army.
- Lieutenant-Colonel George Leslie Wood, DSO MC (58912), The Durham Light Infantry, Territorial Army.
- Colonel John De Lisle Thompson, Southern Rhodesia Territorial Force.
- Colonel Gerald Edward Wells, Southern Rhodesia Territorial Force.

Additional Officer

- Major (temporary) Paul James Banks Knight (194885), The South Staffordshire Regiment. In recognition of non-operational services in Japan in connection with operations in Korea.

Royal Air Force

- Wing Commander Richard Alcock (73562).
- Wing Commander Leslie Thomas Godard Barber, AFC (28260).
- Wing Commander Clifford Thomas Jackaman (35360).
- Wing Commander Robert John Bazley Jackson (35269).
- Wing Commander Frederick Moir Milligan, AFC (37453).
- Wing Commander Francis Walter John Paddon, AFC (45443).
- Wing Commander Alan Pyke (26245).
- Wing Commander Albert Ernest Sims, MBE LRAM ARCM (35204).
- Acting Wing Commander Brian Roger Wakefield Hallows, DFC (77787).
- Acting Wing Commander Henry Lindsay Roxburgh, MB ChB (101810).
- Acting Wing Commander Charles Vivian Winn, DSO DFC (40586).
- Squadron Leader James Michael Birkin, DSO DFC AFC (81350), Royal Auxiliary Air Force.
- Squadron Leader Gerald Blair (43852).
- Squadron Leader Oswald Gradon (21349).
- Squadron Leader Andrew Henry Humphrey, DFC AFC (33543).
- Squadron Leader George Brian Walford (39914).
- Acting Squadron Leader Alfred Roy Driessen (62962), Royal Air Force Volunteer Reserve.
- Acting Squadron Leader Montague Clifford Hart (31441).

Civil Division

- Bernard Joseph Ahern, Principal Officer, Ministry of Commerce, Northern Ireland,
- John Allan, Member of the Scottish Council of Welfare, Air Training Corps.
- John Brock Allon, Town Clerk of Wolverhampton.
- Arthur William Angus, MSc, Director of Instrument Production, Ministry of Supply.
- Mary Frances Applebey, Principal, German Section, Foreign Office.
- David Archibald, General Secretary of the North Atlantic British Liner Committee.
- Arthur James Atkins, Principal Armament Supply Officer, Mediterranean, Admiralty.
- Herbert Bardgett, FRCO, Chorus Master and Conductor.
- Henry Sidney Barnes, Principal, Ministry of Agriculture & Fisheries.
- Harold Barrett, Principal, Board of Customs & Excise.
- Francis Alfred Bear, Principal, Board of Trade.
- Joe Blackburn. For public services in Pontefract, West Riding of Yorkshire, lately president of the Society of Radiographers.
- Roy Courtney Bloodworth, Deputy Director (Finance), Ministry of Civil Aviation.
- Cyril Boddington, Director and General Manager, Berkshire Printing Co. Ltd., Reading.
- James Ryding Bond, MBE MSc, Principal of the Broomfield Farm Institute, Derbyshire.
- Alan Garnet Bonny, AMICE, Chief Engineer, Technical Training Command, Air Ministry.
- Sydney Edward Joseph Brady, MBE, lately Principal, Board of Trade.
- Alderman Harry Charles Brown, Chairman, Bournemouth and Poole Local Employment Committee, and Disablement Advisory Committee.
- Lieutenant-Colonel Henry Jackson Butchart, DSO TD DL, Secretary, University of Aberdeen.
- Llewellyn Francis Cadwallader, FCIS, Director, National Association of Master Bakers, Confectioners & Caterers.
- Kenneth Allerton Cameron, Sound Supervisor, Crown Film Unit, Central Office of Information.
- Andrew John Charnock, General Works Manager, Leyland Motors Ltd.
- Arthur Herbert Clarke, lately Principal, Ministry of Agriculture & Fisheries.
- Reuben Clarke, MIMarE, Marine Director, Laurence, Scott & Electromotors Ltd., Norwich.
- Eric William Cockcroft. For public services in Todmorden, Lancashire.
- Norman John Wilding Cole, MBE, Chairman, Folkestone, Ashford & District War Pensions Committee.
- Henry George Coleman, JP. For political and public services in Islington.
- The Reverend Keith Earle Collins, General Superintendent, Missions to Seamen.
- Horace Ernest Comben, AMICE, Joint Managing Director, Comben & Wakeling Ltd.
- Alderman Nellie Marie Cowan, Chairman, Willesden Local Employment Committee.
- Alwyn Stuart Craig, Under-Sheriff, City and County of Londonderry.
- Arthur Crossley, Managing Director, Henry Crossley (Packings) Ltd., Bolton.
- Victor Alexander Rutherford Davidson, Manager of the Fish Curing Sections, Scottish Co-operative Wholesale Society Ltd., Aberdeen.
- Thomas Eynon Davies. For services as Chairman, Bridgend & District Local Employment Committee and Youth Employment Committee.
- William Leslie Day, Engineer I, Atomic Energy Establishment, Ministry of Supply.
- Henry Lewis de Bourcier, MBE, Principal, Ministry of Fuel & Power.
- Lieutenant-Commander Horace Denton, Royal Navy (Retired). Chairman, Ancillary Staffs Whitley Council, National Health Service.
- Fred Dewhurst, MIMechE, Engineer and Works Manager, London Fire Brigade.
- Margaret Digby, Secretary of the Horace Plunkett Foundation.
- Colonel Walter Doherty, Assistant Chief Constable, City of Glasgow Police.
- Archibald Dryburgh, Chairman of Central Farmers Ltd., Fife.
- Richard Frederick Roberts Dunbar, Principal Officer, Ministry of Home Affairs, Northern Ireland.
- Donald George Dyne, Senior Principal Clerk, Board of Inland Revenue.
- Reginald Thomas Ebrey, FCIS, General Manager, Western Welsh Omnibus Co. Ltd.
- William Russell Edmunds, TD, Principal, HM Treasury.
- William Stanley Edwards, Senior Inspector of Taxes, Board of Inland Revenue.
- Florence Eileen Elliott, Matron of Royal Victoria Hospital, Belfast.
- Alfred Ernest Evans, Secretary, Association of Teachers in Technical Institutions.
- Emrys Evans, lately Town Clerk, Wallasey.
- Maurice Gordon Farquharson, MC, Head of the Secretariat, British Broadcasting Corporation.
- John George Duncan Ferries, Chairman, Ministry of National Insurance Local Appeal Tribunal, Aberdeen.
- Agnes Mary Field Hankin. For services as Director of the Children's Film Department of the J. Arthur Rank Organisation.
- Frederick Charles Fitzpatrick, Representative of the Amalgamated Engineering Union on the Admiralty Industrial Council and the Shipbuilding Trades Joint Council.
- David Morley-Fletcher. For services as Senior Director of the Colonial Development Corporation (West Africa) Ltd.
- Benjamin Gardner, General Secretary, Amalgamated Engineering Union.
- John Wighton Gibson, Firemaster, Angus Fire Brigade.
- Gertrude May Godden, Matron of Hammersmith Hospital.
- Alderman Eleanor Kathleen Goodrich, JP. For public services in Wandsworth.
- Lionel Ingersoll Gordon, Crown Agent for Scotland.
- Mitchell Woods Gordon, JP. For political and public services.
- Erica Beatrice Faith Graham, lately Chairman, Women's Land Army County Welfare Committee, Bedfordshire.
- William Gordon Green, MBE, Chief Investigation Officer, Board of Customs & Excise.
- Charles Greenwood, MICE LRIBA, City Engineer and Surveyor, Chester.
- Harry Bordley Greenwood, Clerk of the Peace and of the County Council, Westmorland.
- Sydney Gully, Chief Executive Officer, Ministry of Health.
- Colonel Philip Ashley Hall, DSO MC TD JP DL, Secretary, County of Buckingham Territorial & Auxiliary Forces Association.
- Robert Hall, Chief Constable of Rotherham.
- Thomas James Canterbury Hamilton, Vice-President, Belfast City Savings Council.
- Councillor Arthur Hampton, JP. For political and public services in Staffordshire.
- Commander Harold Geoffrey Leech Harvey, Royal Navy (Retired), lately Chairman, Bristol Central Committee, Sea Cadet Corps.
- Robert Gordon Hattle, Finance Officer and Accountant, Department of Agriculture for Scotland.
- Ashley Eldrid Havinden. For services to industrial design. Director, W. S. Crawford Ltd., Advertising Agents.
- James Hawitt, MBE, Chairman, Darlington Savings Committee.
- William Charleson Hedge, Principal, Scottish Home Department.
- Wilfred Lanceley Heywood, Secretary, National Association of Unions in the Textile Trade.
- Edward Hinrich, Assistant Controller of Supplies, Ministry of Works.
- John Hirst, AFC, Clerk to the River Trent Catchment Board.
- Arthur Hoare, MIMechE MINA MIMarE, Engineer Manager, J. Samuel White & Co. Ltd., Cowes.
- Harold Hoffman, FICS, Senior Shipping Manager, Lever Bros., and Unilever Ltd.
- Samuel Leonard Hopkinson, Manager, German Office, British Iron & Steel Corporation Ltd.
- Stafford Frank Hough, FICS, Chairman, Falmouth, Truro & District Employment Committee.
- Patrick Edward Husband. For services as Principal Controller, Reparations, Deliveries & Restitutions Branch, Allied Commission for Austria, British Element.
- Major Alfred Huskisson, MC, Managing Director, S. Simpson Ltd., London.
- William Buchan Inglis, MA PhD, Depute Director of Studies, Moray House Training College, Edinburgh.
- William Peter James, Principal, Ministry of Transport.
- Captain Guy William Archibald Jarrett, lately Chief Superintendent (Harwich), Trinity House Steam Vessel Service.
- William Jenkinson, lately Secretary to the Armagh County Council.
- Percy Johnson, Receiver of Parliament Office Fees and Accountant, House of Lords.
- Herbert James Jones, MC, Controller, National Assistance Board, Scotland.
- Hugh Jones, Assistant Regional Controller, Ministry of National Insurance, Cardiff.
- Florence Elizabeth Kaye, Matron of Aberdeen Royal Infirmary.
- Tom Knowles, Chief Officer, Cambridgeshire Fire Brigade.
- Eric Abel Knox, Assistant Clerk of the London County Council.
- John Campbell Lang, Chairman, General Council, Scottish Trades Union Congress.
- Margaret Dorothy Law, Managing Editor, Chambers Encyclopaedia.
- John Alfred Arthur Leach, Principal, Ministry of Food.
- Francis Desmond Littlewood, Town Clerk of Cheltenham.
- William Douglas Lockhart, lately Senior Inspector, Ministry of Town & Country Planning. (Now Temporary Inspector.)
- Leslie Lord, Assistant Agricultural Adviser, Colonial Office.
- Edward Arthur Lovell, ARCS, Principal Scientific Officer, Air Ministry.
- Harold Newton Lowe, MSc, Deputy Director of Education, Liverpool.
- Andrew MacAlpine, President, National Association of Colliery Overmen, Deputies and Shotfirers.
- Lionel Gilbert Machin, Deputy Director of Audit, Exchequer & Audit Department.
- Duncan MacLennan, Chairman of the Visiting Committees of Polmont Borstal Institution and Edinburgh Prison Male Borstal Section.
- Robert Marchbank, MM, Regional House Coal Officer, Scotland.
- Mary Marsden, Administrator, Women's Voluntary Services, Germany.
- Sam Brook Martin, MBE, Manager, Naval Canteen Service, Navy, Army & Air Force Institutes.
- Captain William Verner Miller, County Inspector, Royal Ulster Constabulary.
- John James Milton, JP. For political and public services in Bristol.
- John Jones Morris, Commodore Chief Engineer, Blue Star Line.
- Lionel George Paterson Morris, MM, Chief Executive Officer, Ministry of National Insurance.
- Herbert Stanley Munday, Assistant Accountant General, Ministry of Fuel & Power.
- Lieutenant-Colonel John Nevile Chaworth-Musters, DSO TD JP DL, Chairman, Price Regulation Committee, North Midland Region.
- Edward George Neate, Deputy Director of Navy Contracts, Admiralty.
- Alderman Albert Pennington Nicol, JP, Chairman, Food Control Committee, Huddersfield County Borough.
- Emily Rebecca Noall, JP. For political and public services in the Isle of Wight.
- Mabel Orchard, lately Headmistress, Carlton Vale Secondary School for Girls, Willesden.
- Harry Ashmore Pass, lately Grade 2 Officer, Ministry of Labour & National Service.
- William Hugh Clifford Patrick, MD, Regional Medical Officer, Ministry of Health.
- Richard Ino Payne, Assistant Director, Fresh Fruit & Vegetables Division, Ministry of Food.
- Arthur John Pegg, MBE, Chief Test Pilot, Bristol Aeroplane Company Ltd.
- Cecil Lodge Philcox, DFC ARICS, First Class Valuer, Board of Inland Revenue.
- Margaret Phillips, Principal, Borthwick Training College, London.
- Arnold Platts, PhD, HM Inspector of Schools, Ministry of Education.
- Thomas George Richards, AMICE, Senior Engineer, Roads Department, Ministry of Transport.
- Joseph Herbert Richardson, Controller (Publicity), Public Relations Department, General Post Office.
- Philip John Sampey Richardson. For services to Ballet.
- Ellen Roberts, MBE RRC, Matron-in-Chief, Ministry of Pensions Nursing Service.
- Alexander Robertson, MBE, Deputy Licensing Authority (Scotland), Ministry of Transport.
- John Charles Robertson, Chairman, Swinton & Pendlebury Savings Committee, Lancashire.
- William James Rodda, Member of the National Savings Committee.
- William Hume-Rothery, DSc FRS. Lecturer in Metallurgical Chemistry, University of Oxford.
- William Young Sandeman, MC MICE, Civil Engineer, Railway Executive, Scottish Region.
- Archibald Scott. For services to the linen industry in Northern Ireland.
- Frank Severs, Principal, Admiralty.
- Frederick Shakeshaft, AMIEE, Generation Design Engineer, British Electricity Authority.
- Andrew James Shinnie, MD ChB, Medical Officer of Health, City of Westminster.
- Harry Samuel Shipway, Factory Manager, Post Office Factories Department, Birmingham.
- William Duncan Simpson, MBE, Chief Officer (Scotland), Ministry of Pensions.
- Arthur Edward Haswell Sinclair. For services as Joint Assistant Secretary, Civil Service Commission.
- Alderman Albert Victor Smith, JP. For political and public services in Ipswich.
- Frank Harry Smith, Finance Officer, London Telecommunications Region, General Post Office.
- Thyra Smith, HM Inspector of Schools, Ministry of Education.
- Vernon Alexander Spinks, Assistant Chief Inspector, Immigration Branch, Home Office.
- John Edgar Stanier, GM, Divisional Manager, West Midlands Gas Board.
- Kenneth Harry Staple, Secretary and Legal Adviser, British Overseas Airways Corporation.
- William Steedman, PhD, Attached to Research Department, Foreign Office.
- Captain Harry Steele, Master, SS Port Brisbane, Port Line Ltd.
- John Whiteforde Stevenson, MC PhD, Assistant Director of Studies, Royal Military Academy Sandhurst.
- Harry Stoddart. For political services in Gateshead and Jarrow.
- Oliffe Briant Stokes, Chairman, Bradford Savings Committee.
- Captain John William Storey, MBE, Honorary Secretary, Northern Ireland Branch, Forces Help Society and Lord Roberts Workshops.
- Robert Gordon Strachan, FRICS, Senior Estates Surveyor, Office of the Receiver for the Metropolitan Police District.
- John William Sullivan, Deputy Regional Controller, Board of Trade.
- Joseph Eric Swindlehurst, MICE FRSanI, Borough Engineer, Hampstead.
- Bertram Tallyn, Chairman, Cambridgeshire & Huntingdonshire District Committee, Eastern Regional Board for Industry.
- Alan Walter Whittington Taylor, Chairman, West Wales District Committee, Welsh Board for Industry.
- Frederick Mouatt Keith Thomas, Joint Chief Surveyor and Contracts Manager, John Mowlem & Co. Ltd. For services in the rebuilding of the House of Commons.
- Walter Wilson Thornton, Assistant Chief Constable of Lancashire.
- Thomas Percy Threlkeld, Superintending Inspector of Factories, Ministry of Labour & National Service.
- Lewis Edward Trevers, MBE BEM, Honorary Rescue Adviser, Civil Defence Department, Home Office.
- William George Venton, Principal Clerk, Companies (Winding-up) Department, Supreme Court of Judicature.
- Lieutenant-Colonel Arthur Herbert Vergin, Conference Officer, Grade I, Foreign Office.
- Sidney Ernest Waldron, Principal, Ministry of National Insurance.
- Walter Stanley Warwick, Principal, HM Treasury.
- Frederick Vincent Watts, AMIMechE, Senior Engineer, Prison Commission.
- Harry West, Higher Collector, Manchester, Board of Customs & Excise.
- Joseph Whalen, JP. For political and public services in Manchester.
- Charles Gerald White, Principal, Air Ministry.
- Lawson Scott-White, MICE, Senior Partner, R. Travers Morgan & Partners.
- Cyril John Arther Whitehouse, Principal, Ministry of Supply.
- Donovan Williams, MBE, Principal, German Section, Foreign Office.
- Peter Jones Williams, LRIBA, Principal Regional Architect, Ministry of Health.
- James Alexander Wright, MC ARICS, Senior Architect, Ministry of Works.
- John Arnold Wyer, Assistant Regional Controller, London Appointments Office, Ministry of Labour & National Service.
- Gladys Young West, Radio Actress.
- The Reverend Canon Herbert Brown, MA, lately Chaplain at His Majesty's Embassy at Madrid.
- Captain Andrew Charles Duncan, lately First Secretary (Commercial) at His Majesty's Embassy in Brussels.
- Sidney Edwards Faithful, First Secretary at His Majesty's Legation in Korea.
- James Fanstone, MD, Physician, Surgeon and Founder of the Hospital Evangelico Goiano, at Anápolis.
- Kenneth James Hird, MA, lately First Secretary (Labour) at His Majesty's Embassy at Tehran.
- Carl William Hirschberg, lately His Majesty's Consul at Elizabethville. (Now at Geneva.)
- John Bruce Spens Jardine, British Council Representative in Poland.
- Roy Goodwin Kilburne, Chief Electrical Engineer to the Government of Nepal.
- Guy Percival L'Estrange, British Vice-Consul at Macassar.
- William Miller, MBE, His Majesty's Consul at Marseilles.
- Chaim Raphael, Economic Information Officer, British Information Services, New York.
- Alfred Julius Sington, MC, His Majesty's Consul at Bratislava.
- William James Vyvyan Taylor, Controller of Agriculture, British Administration, Tripolitania.
- Edmund David Watt, MBE, British Consul at Port-au-Prince.
- Duncan Harkness Weir, Private Secretary and Comptroller to the Governor-General of the Sudan.
- William Wells, General Manager of the Antofagasta-Bolivia Railway Company.
- Arthur George Worrall, General Manager in Egypt of the British Coaling Depots Ltd.
- Lieutenant-Colonel William Edgar Andrews, ED, late Auxiliary Force (India), Principal, La Martiniere College, Lucknow, India.
- William George Barnard, BVSc, Principal Veterinary Officer, Swaziland.
- Joseph Ashton Burton, MM, Honorary Chairman, House Committee, Royal Empire Society.
- Lionel Hedley Collett, MBE, Agricultural and Livestock Officer, Basutoland.
- Nancy Cook, MSc, Reader-in-Charge of Bacteriology, University of Adelaide, State of South Australia.
- Philip Henry Gifford, lately Chief Inspector of Schools, Southern Rhodesia.
- Olive Mary Hargreaves, Vice-President of the Executive Committee of the Society for the Oversea Settlement of British Women.
- Herbert Hays, of Devonport, State of Tasmania. For public services.
- Olive Hicken, JP. For social welfare services in the State of Victoria.
- Maxwell Robert Arthur Lamshed. For voluntary services in connection with the Red Cross Society and the Lord Mayor's Food for Britain Campaign, in the State of South Australia.
- Edward Heygate Sunderland Lewis, General Manager, The Assam Oil Co., Digboi, Upper Assam, India.
- Louis Monod, Secretary and Chief Executive Officer, Royal Agricultural Society, State of Victoria.
- Richard Greenslade Moore, Mayor of Kalgoorlie, State of Western Australia, since 1937.
- Arthur Osmond Richardson. For voluntary services in connection with the despatch of food parcels from the State of South Australia to Great Britain.
- John Lloyd Roberts, a member of the Broadcasting Advisory Board, Southern Rhodesia.
- Major Robert Rich Sharp, a member of the Land Settlement Board, Southern Rhodesia.
- Martin Joseph Talbot Wertheimer. For public services in the State of Tasmania.
- The Reverend William Lawson Brooks Wrenford, of the Society of the Sacred Mission at Teyateyaneng, Basutoland.
- Edward Cecil Stapleton Adkins, Colonial Administrative Service, Secretary for Chinese Affairs, Singapore.
- Frank Agius, Collector of Customs, Malta.
- Abbas El Arculli. For public services in Hong Kong.
- The Reverend Christian Gonzales Baeta, Senior Lecturer in Theology, the University College of the Gold Coast.
- Archdeacon Frederick Robert Banks, Vicar General of the Anglican Church in Trinidad.
- Geoffrey Tunstall Bates, Controller of Essential Commodities, Sarawak.
- Colin William Carnegie-Brown. For public services in Tanganyika.
- Henry Francis Cardona. For public services in Gibraltar.
- Richard Charles Catling, Colonial Police Service, Superintendent of Police, Federation of Malaya.
- William Alec Cole. For public services in Nyasaland.
- Henry Franklin, Colonial Administrative Service, Director of Information, Northern Rhodesia.
- Alexander Gray, AMICE, Port Engineer, Aden Port Trust, Aden.
- Percy James Greenway, Colonial Agricultural Service, Systematic Botanist, East African Agriculture and Forestry Research Organisation, East Africa High Commission.
- George Herbert Heaton, Commissioner of Prisons, Kenya.
- The Reverend Arthur Joseph Hopkins, lately Superintendent of the Methodist Missionary Society, Kenya.
- Percival Victor Hunt. For public services in the Seychelles.
- Thomas Edward Jager. For public services in Northern Rhodesia.
- Vincent Kenneth Johnson, Colonial Administrative Service, Administrative Officer Class I, Nigeria.
- Frederick Robert Kay, Colonial Administrative Service, Administrative Officer Class II, Nigeria.
- Cyril Eric Wool-Lewis, Colonial Administrative Service, Commissioner of the Turks and Caicos Islands.
- Alan Courtenay Luck, lately Colonial Police Service, Assistant Commissioner of Police, Nigeria.
- Hugh Vernon McDonald, Colonial Administrative Service, Native Courts Adviser, Nyasaland.
- Ernest Arthur McGill, MSc AMICE, Deputy Chief Engineer, Civil Engineering Department, Crown Agents for the Colonies.
- James Wilson Macmillan. For public services in British Honduras.
- Stanley George Masterman, Acting District Commissioner, British Solomon Islands Protectorate.
- James Crichton Mathison. For public services in the Federation of Malaya.
- Alexander Miller, Manager, British Cotton Growing Association, Nigeria.
- Captain Hugh Maxwell Naylor. For public services in Uganda.
- Ng Sen Choy. For public services in Singapore.
- Captain Howard Nobbs, MSc FRIC, Principal, Queens College, British Guiana.
- Charles Roy Petty, lately Colonial Survey Service, Director of Surveys, Gold Coast.
- Mohamed Ali Rana, MBE MRCS LRCP. For public services in Kenya.
- Alan William Steward, British Council Representative, Nigeria.
- Eric Jackson Smallfield, lately Surveyor-General, North Borneo.
- Roger John Massy Swynnerton, MC, Colonial Agricultural Service, Senior Agricultural Officer, Tanganyika.
- Ratu George Tuisawau, Roko Tui Nadroga and Navosa, Fiji.
- Bertram Arthur Todd Williams, lately Comptroller of Customs, Barbados.
- Leon James Williams, MD. For public services in Bermuda.

Honorary Officers

- Yap Mau Tatt. For public services in the Federation of Malaya.
- Wan Ali bin Wan Chik, Orang Kaya Indra Maharaja Perba Jelai, Federation of Malaya.

==== Members of the Order of the British Empire (MBE) ====
Military Division

Royal Navy

- Wardmaster Lieutenant Douglas Barnard.
- Lieutenant-Commander (L) Harold Lewis Bishop.
- Second Officer Joan Margaret Hales, Women's Royal Naval Service.
- Lieutenant-Commander (E) John Walter Hall.
- Lieutenant-Commander Charles Henry Hammer.
- Lieutenant-Commander (Sp.) John Anthony Bernard Harrisson, DSC, Royal Naval Volunteer Reserve.
- Acting Interim Surgeon Lieutenant-Commander William Boyd Jack, BM BCh.
- Surgeon Lieutenant Trevor Stansfield Law, MB ChB.
- Instructor Lieutenant Bernard Piper.
- Lieutenant-Commander John Trevor Rushforth.
- Temporary Lieutenant-Commander (Sp.) Thomas William Sherrin, Royal Naval Volunteer Reserve.
- Lieutenant (E) Thomas Reginald Stafford, DSC.
- Mr. Michael Gerard Sullivan, Temporary Acting Commissioned Communication Officer. On loan to the Government of India as Temporary Commissioned Communication Officer.
- Lieutenant (S) Albert John Trundley.

Additional Member

- Lieutenant (S) Joseph Augustine McGoldrick, Royal Navy. In recognition of non-operational services in Japan in connection with operations in Korea.

Army

- No. 5610835 Warrant Officer Class II William John Baldock, The Devonshire Regiment, Territorial Army.
- Major (temporary) William Richard Boalch (49165), The Duke of Cornwall's Light Infantry.
- Major (temporary) Raymond Booth (68023), Royal Army Ordnance Corps.
- The Reverend Charles John Henry William Andrew Bradley (301695), Chaplain to the Forces, Third Class (temporary), Royal Army Chaplains Department.
- Captain Charles Edward Brook (202477), The Royal Sussex Regiment.
- Major (acting) William Macbeth Brown (63148), Combined Cadet Force.
- Major (acting) Irving Nelson Burgess (272313), Army Cadet Force.
- No. 7870321 Warrant Officer Class I Alexander Edward Burton, Royal Tank Regiment, Royal Armoured Corps.
- Major (temporary) David Johnstone Campell, TD (90973), Royal Regiment of Artillery.
- Major (temporary) Charles Leslie Carter (116747), Corps of Royal Engineers.
- Major Thomas Davie Childs (188807), Royal Corps of Signals, Territorial Army.
- Captain Edwin Henry Coombs (266744), Royal Regiment of Artillery.
- No. 7888944 Warrant Officer Class II Edward Mervyn Courtney, Royal Tank Regiment, Royal Armoured Corps.
- Major (temporary) Arthur Cowen (102914), General List, attached Royal Army Ordnance Corps.
- Major (temporary) James Curtis (261368), Corps of Royal Engineers.
- No. W/11049 Warrant Officer Class II Margaret Elizabeth Jane Darby, Women's Royal Army Corps.
- No. S/91638 Warrant Officer Class II George Francis Darbyshire, Royal Army Service Corps.
- Major (Quartermaster) Marshall Darkes (127398), The King's Own Royal Regiment (Lancaster).
- No. 550390 Warrant Officer Class I George Henry Day, 12th Royal Lancers (Prince of Wales's), Royal Armoured Corps.
- Captain (local Major) Carmen Vera Elizabeth de Bourbel (257015), Women's Royal Army Corps.
- No. 890057 Warrant Officer Class II (Artillery Clerk) Ronald Frederick Dell, Royal Regiment of Artillery.
- Major (acting) Francis Reginald Dubery (121577), The Glider Pilot & Parachute Corps, Territorial Army.
- Major (temporary) Hamilton James Elverson, MB (246792), Royal Army Medical Corps.
- Major John Neilson Frazer, MC (392347), 2nd King Edward VII's Own Gurkha Rifles.
- Major (Quartermaster) Thomas Henry Alexander Godbold (69353), The Queen's Bays (2nd Dragoon Guards), Royal Armoured Corps (seconded to Extra Regimentally Employed List).
- Major (temporary) William Edward Guest (259896), Army Catering Corps.
- Major (Director of Music) Frederick John Harris, ARCM (221011), Grenadier Guards.
- Major (Quartermaster) Charles Frederick Hedley (169570), Royal Armoured Corps.
- No. 1086979 Warrant Officer Class I Andrew Francis John Heggie, Royal Regiment of Artillery.
- No. 1863281 Warrant Officer Class II Henry Hibbard, Corps of Royal Engineers.
- Captain William Montague Holman (373004), Royal Regiment of Artillery.
- Major William Henry Howlett (78472), Royal Regiment of Artillery, Territorial Army.
- Captain (temporary) Cyril Robert Hume, (390694), Corps of Royal Electrical & Mechanical Engineers.
- Major (acting) James Jardine (100643), Combined Cadet Force.
- Major (temporary) John Hanson Keys (233040), Royal Regiment of Artillery.
- No. 2733291 Warrant Officer Class I Herbert Eric Knight, The Somerset Light Infantry (Prince Albert's).
- Major (acting) Harry Lamming, MM (340603), Army Cadet Force.
- Major Anthony James Lanzon (68499), The York & Lancaster Regiment.
- Major (temporary) Keith Johnstone Lightfoot (108222), Royal Army Service Corps.
- Major (temporary) John Julius Livick (181293), Corps of Royal Engineers.
- No. 7586877 Warrant Officer Class I William Lyon, Royal Army Ordnance Corps.
- Major (Quartermaster) George McCord (112841), The Royal Ulster Rifles (seconded to Extra Regimentally Employed List).
- Major (temporary) James McGarry (199722), Corps of Royal Electrical & Mechanical Engineers.
- No. 6975021 Warrant Officer Class II Lawrence McNamee, The Royal Inniskilling Fusiliers.
- Major (Quartermaster) Sinclair Manson (113930), The Queen's Own Cameron Highlanders.
- Major (temporary) William Eric Wolfe Montgomery (182995), Corps of Royal Electrical & Mechanical Engineers.
- No. 1062220 Warrant Officer Class I Peter Mulvanny, Royal Regiment of Artillery.
- Major Gerald Wolleston Murphy (71162), The South Staffordshire Regiment.
- Major (temporary) John Geoffrey Palmer, MC (85502), Royal Regiment of Artillery.
- Major (temporary) Charles Fox-Parker (143578), The South Lancashire Regiment (now released).
- Major (temporary) Thomas Pearson (165085), The King's Own Scottish Borderers.
- Major Clifton Herbert Rayment (79604), Royal Tank Regiment, Royal Armoured Corps.
- Major (temporary) Leonard Richard Rees (131423), Corps of Royal Engineers.
- Major (temporary) Leslie William Rushbrooke (285094), Royal Pioneer Corps.
- No. 2653987 Warrant Officer Class I Robert William Smith, DCM, Coldstream Guards.
- No. 4601490 Warrant Officer Class II Walter Richard Smith, The Duke of Wellington's Regiment (West Riding), Territorial Army.
- Major William Dennis Patrick Sullivan (162125), Royal Tank Regiment, Royal Armoured Corps.
- Major (temporary) William Robert Leslie Turp (143474), The King's Shropshire Light Infantry.
- Major James Harrison Vickers (99203), Royal Army Medical Corps.
- No. 850901 Warrant Officer Class I Albert George Ward, Royal Army Pay Corps.
- No. 2652912 Warrant Officer Class II John Edward Ward, Coldstream Guards.
- Major (District Officer) Edwin Francis Watkins (146609), Royal Regiment of Artillery.
- Major (temporary) Edward John Westlake (232472), Corps of Royal Engineers.
- Major (temporary) Bertram Frederic William White (202083), Royal Army Service Corps.
- Major (acting) Richard Oliver MacMahon Williams, MC (201598), Royal Corps of Signals, Territorial Army.
- Honorary Lieutenant-Colonel John Garvey, The Kenya Regiment (Territorial Force).
- Major Ian Edmund Snell (219870), The Royal Sussex Regiment. Military Assistant to the Resident Adviser, Mukalla, Aden Protectorate.
- Captain (Quartermaster) William Richard James Stanger, Federated Malay States Volunteer Force.

Royal Air Force

- Acting Wing Commander Charles Austin Percival Noseworthy (102362), Royal Air Force Volunteer Reserve.
- The Reverend Alfred Ernest Cook (169523).
- Squadron Leader Arthur Gerard Reeves Green (45165).
- Acting Squadron Leader Joseph Carey Crabtree Taylor (63663), Royal Air Force Volunteer Reserve.
- Flight Lieutenant Leslie Joseph Broughton Blood, DFM (172708).
- Flight Lieutenant Arthur Gordon Bullen (186967).
- Flight Lieutenant Archibald John Dicker (56395).
- Flight Lieutenant Harold Fishwick (51862).
- Flight Lieutenant Walter James Holmes (57570).
- Flight Lieutenant Robert John Kennett (53281).
- Flight Lieutenant Charles Mayhew (47371), (Retired).
- Flight Lieutenant James Meech (55966).
- Flight Lieutenant Charles Merrick (138937).
- Flight Lieutenant William Lionel Nix (113808), Royal Auxiliary Air Force.
- Flight Lieutenant Donald Lawrence Overton (55967).
- Flight Lieutenant Ivor Allen Parry (49244).
- Flight Lieutenant Reginald Cecil Dixon Vincent. (136173).
- Flight Lieutenant Sydney Albert Warren (50420), (Retired).
- Flight Lieutenant Cecil Bertram Louis Warwick (181283).
- Flight Lieutenant Vincent Evan Morgan Watkins, DFM. (48257).
- Acting Flight Lieutenant Francis Doyle Mainland (91294), Royal Auxiliary Air Force.
- Acting Flight Lieutenant Arthur Jackson Spence (59032).
- Rab Khamshi Eshu Hamzo (X.I33), Iraq Levies.
- Flying Officer Frank Henry Richard Lambourne (548351).
- Warrant Officer Harry Clapp (590253).
- Warrant Officer Frederick Charles Hamilton (510287).
- Warrant Officer Alfred Thomas Knell, MM (340855).
- Warrant Officer John Pollock (516495).
- Warrant Officer Robert John Smith (518145).
- Warrant Officer Allen Moore Sears Stevens (544583).
- Acting Warrant Officer George Wilson Rutter (629867).

Civil Division

- William Thomas Airlie, Vice-Chairman, Edinburgh District Committee, Scottish Board for Industry.
- Frederick Parker Alexander, Senior Executive Officer, Ministry of Supply.
- William Rowan Alexander, Senior Inspector and Head Grader of Milk Products, Scotland, Ministry of Food.
- Percy Raymond Allison, Senior Experimental Engineer, Flight Refuelling Ltd., Littlehampton.
- Herbert Allon, Cashier, Charles D. Holmes & Co. Ltd., Hull.
- Clifford Bernard Andrews. For public services in Fakenham, Norfolk.
- Evan Anthony, Honorary Secretary, Fishguard & Goodwick Savings Committee.
- William George Anwyl, District Officer, Montgomery County Agricultural Executive Committee.
- Walter Fenwick Atkinson, FSAA, Honorary Secretary, Sunderland Rural District Savings Committee.
- Susan Mary Wynyard Atterbury, Secretary to the British Council of the Australian Association of British Manufacturers.
- Sidney Hall Bagshaw, JP, lately Member, Derbyshire Agricultural Executive Committee.
- Edna Bailey, Member, Women's Sub-Committee, Huddersfield Local Employment Committee.
- Lilian Amy Baines, Executive Officer, Home Office.
- William Barker, Chief Inspector, Enforcement Division, Ministry of Food.
- Horace Barlow, Assistant Works Manager, Westquarter Factory, Polmont, Stirlingshire.
- James Joseph Barlow, Head Teacher, Dresden Church of England School, Longton, Stoke-on-Trent
- Charles William Barnard, Senior Executive Officer, Ministry of National Insurance.
- Charles Henry Barrett, Honorary Secretary and Treasurer, Civil Service Lifeboat Fund.
- Idwal Bassett, Senior Executive Officer, Welsh Board of Health.
- Millicent Maud Mears Bathgate, Public Health Nursing Officer, Ministry of Health.
- Lilian Beatrice Beal, Clerical Officer, Admiralty.
- Walter Edgar Bedford, Senior Executive Officer, Ministry of National Insurance.
- Thomas William Bell, Higher Executive Officer, Ministry of Transport.
- Helen Berger Benny, Higher Executive Officer, Ministry of Civil Aviation.
- Eric Leslie Bird, MC ARIBA, Editor, Journal of the Royal Institute of British Architects.
- Alexander Albert Birt, Senior Pilot, HM Dockyard, Rosyth.
- Bertram Ewart Blackledge, Superintendent, Coke Ovens & Fuel Departments, Steel Company of Wales Ltd., Port Talbot.
- Douglas Henry Bolton, Technical Assistant, Grade I, War Office.
- Evelyn Isabel Bond, lately County Organiser for Dorset, Women's Voluntary Services.
- Arthur Stephen Morris Borner, Managing Director, Clifford & Snell Ltd., Sutton, Surrey.
- David James Bowen, Higher Executive Officer, Ministry of Agriculture & Fisheries.
- Arthur Edward Bowles, Assistant Chief Officer, Hampshire Fire Brigade.
- Ernest Lyon Bowley, MC, lately Commissioner, National Savings Committee.
- Captain Robert Matthew Boyle, MC, Assistant Staff Officer, Ulster Special Constabulary.
- Herbert Bradbury, Chairman, Housing Committee, Northwich Rural District Council.
- George Briggs, Experimental Manager, Airspeed Ltd., Christchurch.
- William Leslie Brighty, Foreign Office.
- Carnegie Brown, Inspector of Taxes, Board of Inland Revenue.
- Joliffe John Brown, Chairman of Committee, No. 1465 (Gwynedd, North Wales) Squadron, Air Training Corps.
- Robert Brown, Member, South Ayrshire Savings Committee.
- Walter George Brown, Engineering Manager, Factory Shops, Harland & Wolff Ltd., Belfast.
- John Francis Bulleid, JP, Chairman, Torquay & District Disablement Advisory Committee.
- George Royall Bullwinkle, AMIMechE, lately Engineer of Vauxhall Works, South Eastern Gas Board.
- Ethel Margaret Burnside, lately Matron, Ulster Volunteer Forces Hospital, Belfast.
- James William Buttfield, Director, Whitecroft Pin Manufacturing Co. Ltd., Whitecroft, Gloucestershire.
- Stanley Noel Carter, Chairman, Executive Committee, Bournemouth Workshops for Disabled Sailors & Soldiers.
- Eric Edward Cooper Cawood, Factory and Contracts Manager, Nu-Swift Ltd., Elland, West Riding of Yorkshire.
- Councillor Harry Ernest Chamberlain, JP. For public services in Oldham, Lancashire.
- Harry James Clapp. For public services in East Walthamstow.
- Bernard Clarke, JP, Manager, South Lincolnshire Sub-Division, East Midlands Gas Board.
- Ernest Harwood Clarke, Mining Surveyor, Ministry of Fuel & Power.
- Leonard Clegg, Regional Fuel Engineer, Ministry of Fuel & Power.
- Emma Frances Heather Clode, Deputy Head of Empire and Foreign Department, Women's Voluntary Services.
- Mary Cockshott, Health Visitor, West Riding County Council.
- William Arthur Colwill, Assistant Waterguard Superintendent, Liverpool, Board of Customs & Excise.
- Rose Catherine Coney, Honorary Housing Welfare Officer, Beccles, Suffolk.
- William John Cooper, MIEE, Liaison Officer, South West Scotland Electricity Board.
- Stanley Temple Cope, Principal Moorings Officer, Air Ministry.
- Arthur William Cotterell, JP, Chairman, Walsall Youth Employment Committee.
- Sarah Crothers, Chairman, Lisburn & District Local Savings Committee, County Antrim.
- Mary Grace Cuff, Women's Land Army County Secretary for Oxfordshire and other counties.
- Frederick Charles Davey, lately Principal Foreman, Admiralty.
- Councillor Joseph Davies. For political and public services in Hemsworth & District, Yorkshire.
- Arthur Bond Dawson, Assistant Mining Agent, No.4 Area, Whitehaven, Northern (Northumberland & Cumberland) Division, National Coal Board.
- Samuel Murray Deacon, Deputy Principal (now Principal), Ministry of Agriculture, Northern Ireland.
- Thomas Carmichael Dickie, Divisional Organiser, Association of Engineering & Shipbuilding Draughtsmen.
- John Richard Dickinson, Senior Executive Officer, Ministry of Health.
- James Anderson Dickson, Manager, The Gramophone Co. Ltd., Springfield Road Works (Ministry of Supply Agency Factory), Hayes.
- Frederick Haydn Dimmock. For services to the Boy Scouts Association.
- Violet Hope Dobbin, Member, Ulster Joint Committee, Order of St. John of Jerusalem and the British Red Cross Society.
- Dorothy Mabel Dodd, Superintendent Physiotherapist, Ministry of Pensions.
- Grace Donaldson, Member, Board of Management for Stirling and Clackmannan Hospitals.
- Arthur Charles Parker Dove, Actuary, East Midlands Trustee Savings Bank.
- David Dow, Member, Hill Farming Advisory Committee for Scotland.
- Thomas Smith Duncan, Assistant Designer, Vickers-Armstrongs Ltd., Weybridge, Aircraft Division.
- William Duncan, Superintendent, Liverpool Youth Employment Bureau.
- John William Dunger, Assistant Commercial Superintendent, Train Services (Passenger), Railway Executive (Eastern Region).
- John Eadie, Carpet Designer, James Templeton & Co. Ltd., Glasgow.
- Elizabeth Augusta Roumieu Ealand, ARCM, County Organiser, Surrey Women's Voluntary Services.
- Arthur Ernest Edwards, Chairman of the Civil Service Sanatorium Society.
- Mary Edwards, JP, lately Honorary Secretary, Wimbledon Hospital.
- Lillian Elizabeth Elliott, Headmistress, Field End Primary School, Eastcote, Middlesex.
- Sarah Sawbridge Elliott, Exhibition Director and Acting Secretary, Office Appliance Trades Association of Great Britain & Ireland.
- Richard Francis Ellison, Higher Executive Officer, Ministry of Works.
- Gwendolen Mary Evans, County Organiser, Huntingdonshire, Women's Voluntary Services.
- John Evans, Clerical Officer, Boys' Training Establishment (Royal Navy), Shotley.
- Arthur Bertram Fea, Accountant, Board of Customs & Excise.
- Guy Warwick Ferguson, Staff Assistant to Chief Regional Officer, Railway Executive (North Eastern Region).
- George Henry Fillmore, Civil Assistant and Accountant, No. 27 Maintenance Unit, Air Ministry, Shawbury, Shropshire.
- Gordon Edward Flintham, Foreign Office.
- Harold Flood, National Savings Assembly Member for North Kent.
- Alderman William Henry Flowers, MM. For public services in Ashton-under-Lyne, Lancashire.
- Samuel Ferguson Floyd, MB BCh, General Medical Practitioner, County Down.
- Alice Foley, JP, Chairman, Women's Sub-Committee, Bolton Local Employment Committee.
- Charles Henry Fone, Grade III Officer, Branch B, Foreign Service.
- Elsie Forbes, Staff Nurse, Glanely Sanatorium, Cardiff.
- Archibald Graham Forrester, Estate Surveyor, Ministry of Works.
- William Conchie Forsyth, Chairman, Inverness District Savings Committee.
- Thomas Frederick Fry, Official-in-Charge, Jersey Town Office, British European Airways Corporation.
- Mary Ann Fulcher, Head Teacher, Philipson Children's Sanatorium, Stannington, Morpeth, Northumberland.
- Charles Edgar Garland, MC, Principal Probation Officer, Birmingham.
- Charles Herbert Stanley Garton, Grade I Assistant, Foreign Office.
- Alfred William Gatling, Higher Executive Officer, Board of Inland Revenue.
- Wilfrid Thomas Geden, Station Master, Paddington, Railway Executive.
- David Chalmers Gemmell, Manager, Muiredge Training Centre, Scottish Division, National Coal Board.
- Elizabeth George, Chief Assistant, Leather Control, Board of Trade.
- Basil Leek Gibbs, District Secretary, Birmingham & Midland Sheet Metal Workers Society.
- Eric Dallison Gilding, Signals Officer, Ministry of Civil Aviation.
- Captain Robert Graham Gillespie, Master, MV Mausang, Indo-China Steam Navigation Company Ltd.
- Bert Goddard, Production Manager, Klinger Manufacturing Co. Ltd.
- Wolfe Goldberg, Vice-Chairman, East & West Ridings Regional Board for Industry.
- George Joss Gordon, lately Higher Executive Officer, Ministry of Supply.
- John Harold Gozzett, Senior Executive Officer, War Office.
- Alderman Alfred Graham. For political and public services in Barking and Brentwood.
- Janet Grant, Sister-in-Charge, Male Wards, East Fortune Sanatorium, Drem, East Lothian.
- Joseph Gray. For public services in Armagh.
- Elisha George Sandham Gregory, Assistant Engineer, London Telecommunications Region.
- Herbert Charles Gregory, lately Executive Officer, British Museum.
- Olive Constance Gregory, Chief Superintendent of Typists, Ministry of Works.
- Alderman Thomas Edward Gwillim, Member, Brecon Agricultural Executive Committee.
- Harold Norman Hadaway, Grade 3 Officer, Ministry of Labour & National Service.
- Mary Sinclair Haig, Executive Officer, Department of Health for Scotland.
- Frederick James Hando, Headmaster, Hatherleigh Secondary Modern School, Newport, Monmouthshire.
- Emanuel Harbron, JP, Divisional Organiser, Amalgamated Engineering Union.
- William Reginald Harrison, Senior Executive Officer, Ministry of Supply.
- William Frederick Hartmann, Senior Executive Officer, HM Land Registry.
- Florrie Harvie, District Organiser, Eastern District of Scotland, Women's Voluntary Services.
- Arthur Henry Harwood, Senior Executive Officer, Central Ordnance Depot, War Office, Chilwell.
- Ada Maud Hawkins, Honorary Secretary, Camberwell Savings Committee.
- Alfred William Hawkins, Manager, Government Training Centre and Industrial Rehabilitation Unit, Leicester.
- Gerald Alfred Victor Hayes, ACIS, Senior Secretarial Assistant, British Transport Commission.
- Edward Head, Port Labour Officer, National Dock Labour Board.
- Walter Victor Heasley, County Commissioner of Scouts in County Down.
- William Heavey, Senior Dockmaster, Port of London Authority.
- Hilda May Helms, Private Secretary to the General Manager, North Eastern Trading Estates Ltd.
- George Henry Bishop Heppel, District Officer, HM Coastguard, Berwick.
- James Heyes. For services to farming in Lancashire.
- Leo Sebastian Heyes, Higher Executive Officer, Home Office.
- Anne Dorothy Hindle, Chairman, Cranbrook Rural Food Control Committee.
- Edgar Hirst, Higher Executive Officer, Ministry of Civil Aviation.
- Alexander Hislop, lately Warden, Colonial Office Hostel for Moslem Seamen, South Shields.
- Thomas Sydney Hobbs, Secretary of the Mersey District of the Shipping Federation Ltd.
- John Benjamin Hodges, Higher Executive Officer, Ministry of Fuel & Power.
- Ernest Joseph Frederick Clausson Hogg, Higher Executive Officer, Ministry of Health.
- Alfred Charles Holding, Special Grade Clerk, Headquarters, Malaya District, War Office.
- William Holland, Deputy Chief Officer, East Sussex Fire Brigade.
- Mabel Jessie Hooper, lately Clerical Assistant to the Medical Adviser, Commonwealth Relations Office.
- Kathleen Thehna Hosegood, Higher Executive Officer, Ministry of Education.
- Dorothy Isabel Hubbard, County Superintendent for Sussex, St. John Ambulance Brigade.
- Henry Hubbuck, General Manager, Robinson & Sons Ltd., Chesterfield.
- Oswald Cyril Blake Hughes, Higher Executive Officer, Air Ministry.
- William Hunter, Honorary Secretary, Okehampton & District Savings Committee.
- Alfred Hutchings, Engineer and Surveyor to the Cuckfield Rural District Council.
- Mary Hutchinson, Principal Sister Tutor, Stobhill Hospital, Glasgow.
- Henry Jackson, JP, Farmer. For services to agriculture in Cumberland.
- James Jackson, Works Manager, HM Stationery Office Press.
- Arthur Edward James, Grocer Member, Cardiff Borough Food Control Committee.
- Charles Alfred James, Chief Executive Officer, Ministry of Supply.
- Joshua James, Chairman, Ashton-under-Lyne Youth Employment Committee.
- Sydney Jeffrey, Works Superintendent, W. H. A. Robertson & Co. Ltd., Bedford.
- Frank Herbert Jenkins, ARCM ARCO, Senior Executive Officer, Ministry of Transport.
- Harold Dawson Jennett, Departmental Manager, Brown Bayley's Steel Works Ltd., Sheffield.
- Gordon Sotham Jennings, FRICS, Chief Assistant Surveyor, Southend-on-Sea County Borough Council.
- Frederick Surridge Jones, Flour Recovery Officer.
- Lily Ann Jones. For public and charitable services in Ferndale and district, Glamorganshire.
- John Junor, Member, Hamilton, Lanarkshire, Local Employment Committee and Court of Referees.
- Ildefons Florian Kedzierzykowski, Intelligence Officer I, Control Commission for Germany, British Element.
- Percy Frederick Keen, Senior Executive Officer, Admiralty.
- William John James Keen, Higher Executive Officer, Ministry of Defence.
- Victor Kelsey, MC, Drainage Officer, Lincolnshire (Lindsey) Agricultural Executive Committee.
- Marguerite Elizabeth Kidd, Secretary, Fermanagh County Hospital.
- Cedric Marcus King, Honorary Secretary, Coffee Importers & Exporters Association of London Ltd.
- Reginald Fred Knowler, Superintendent, Lincolnshire Constabulary.
- William Robert Knox, MM, JP. For public services in County Antrim.
- Jack Laurence, Higher Executive Officer, Board of Inland Revenue.
- Edward Augustine Lowe Laxton, Director of Laxton Bros., Bedford Ltd., Nurserymen.
- Rudolph Lederer, Senior Control Officer, Control Commission for Germany, British Element.
- Louisa Allan Lee, Controller of Typists, Ministry of Pensions.
- Robert Lee, MIEE, AMIMechE, Sub-Area Liaison Officer, London Electricity Board.
- George William Brand Leslie, Skipper Motor Fishing Boat Betty Leslie, Shetland.
- Andrew King Lewis, Chief Staff Assistant, Glasgow Education Authority.
- Elizabeth Lindsay, Headmistress, Gartcraig Junior Secondary School, Glasgow.
- Reginald Sydney Lobb, Chief-Superintendent, Metropolitan Police.
- Alderman Harry Lord, JP, lately Local Army Welfare Officer for Stretford and Davyhulme, Lancashire.
- Roderick Edward Louch, Head of the Poultry Keeping Department, Cheshire School of Agriculture.
- Peter Low, MIMarE AMIMechE, Superintendent, Purfleet Installation, Anglo-American Oil Co.
- Arnold Lowe, Manager, Chanters Colliery, North Western Division, National Coal Board.
- Percival John Luxton, Chief Clerk of Works, Ministry of Works. For services in the rebuilding of the House of Commons.
- George Maxwell Lyne, Assistant Master, Blackpool Grammar School.
- Councillor George Gall McDiarmid, Chairman, Scottish Committee of the National Joint Apprenticeship Council for the Farriery & Blacksmith Trade.
- Alexander Macdonald, Works Manager, North British Locomotive Company Ltd., Glasgow.
- Thomas Leslie McDonald, Chairman of McDonald Engineers (Kirkcaldy) Ltd.
- John McInroy, Horticultural Officer, Southern European District, Imperial War Graves Commission.
- Martha Ellen MacKenzie, JP, County Officer for Fermanagh, St. John Ambulance Brigade.
- Douglas James Mackie, Manager, Cable & Wireless, Hong Kong.
- James Finlay McKinnon, Senior Collector of Taxes, Board of Inland Revenue.
- Charles Samuel Mackley, Senior Executive Officer, Board of Trade.
- John Louis MacLaughlan, Reporter to the Kemsley Group and Representative of the Press Association (Greenock & District).
- Lendrick McMaster. For services to the Belfast Boys Brigade.
- The Reverend John Roderick Macpherson, Minister, St. Andrew's Church, Kirkintilloch. Founder of the Kirkintilloch Junior Choir.
- William Edward Mallett, Chief Engineer Officer, MV Royal Sovereign, General Steam Navigation Co.
- Edward George Marshall, Records Officer, Imperial War Graves Commission.
- Harold Martingell, Senior Member of the Central Committee, The Royal Naval Benevolent Trust.
- Seymour Mitchell, Head Pharmacist and Technical Assistant to the Medical Director General, Royal Naval Medical Depot, Risley.
- Peggie Flora Morden, Head of Services Welfare (Home) Department, Women's Voluntary Services.
- Charles Ernest Morgan, Assistant Postmaster, Head Post Office, Birmingham.
- David Edgar Morgan, Deputy Chief Constable, Swansea.
- Councillor Frank Morris, JP. For political and public services in Barnsley.
- Thomas James Morris, Postmaster, Mountain Ash, Glamorganshire.
- Bertram Munn, Officer, Board of Customs & Excise.
- Elsie Rosina May Musselwhite, Personal Assistant to Head of Technical Services, British Joint Services Mission, Washington.
- John Henry North, Higher Executive Officer, Home Office.
- Edward Francis O'Neill, Headmaster, Prestolee School, Manchester.
- Claud Meredith Overton, Senior Executive Officer, Ministry of National Insurance.
- Harold Owens, Chairman, South Wales Regional Committee, Transport & General Workers Union.
- Frederick Horn Paley, Vice-Chairman, Wearside District Committee, Northern Regional Board for Industry.
- Leonard George Pargiter, Senior Architect, Ministry of Works. For services in the rebuilding of the House of Commons.
- Alderman Daisy Parsons, JP. For public services in West Ham.
- Edwin James Paton, Executive Officer, Central Office of Information.
- Charles James Pattison, Chief Engineer, Hobourn Aero Components, Rochester.
- Dora Alice Payne, Senior Executive Officer, Ministry of National Insurance.
- George Edgar Pearce, Local Fuel Overseer for Stroud Urban & Rural Districts.
- Thomas Charles Pearson, JP, Secretary, Printing & Kindred Trades Federation, Birmingham & District.
- Bertie Peckham. For services as Control Officer I, Control Commission for Germany, British Element.
- William Ewart Pegg, Higher Executive Officer, Office of HM Procurator General & Treasury Solicitor.
- Samuel Dunsdon Pendry, AMIEE, Engineer, Telephone Manager's Office, Guildford.
- John Howard Audley Perkins, AMICE, Director of John Perkins & Son Ltd., Bristol.
- Fanny Matilda Phelps, District Midwife, Bemerton, Wiltshire.
- Councillor Harry Pilkington. For political and public services in Gloucestershire.
- John Pointon, Honorary Secretary, Welshpool Savings Committee.
- Harold Vincent Pollard, MIMechE, Senior Experimental Officer, Department of Scientific & Industrial Research.
- Walter Dudley Potts, Senior Executive Officer, Ministry of National Insurance.
- Eric James Powell, Senior Chief Technical Officer, Ministry of Works. For services in the rebuilding of the House of Commons.
- William Francis Thomas Powell, Honorary Secretary, Swanage Lifeboat Station.
- Kathleen Seymour Pring, lately County Organiser for Staffordshire, Women's Voluntary Services.
- Claude William Loftus Purkiss, Labour Advisory Officer, Ministry of Agriculture & Fisheries.
- William George Pyatt, FRSI, Chief Sanitary Inspector, Cardiff County Borough Council.
- John Rae, BEM, Engineering Manager, John Brown & Company Ltd., Clydebank.
- Wallace George Rainer, JP, Chairman, Southend Local Employment Committee.
- Reginald Frederick Rees, Vice-Chairman, Great Marlborough Street Local Employment Committee.
- Albert Edward Rendle, Senior Executive Officer, Ministry of National Insurance.
- Margaret Louise Rickey, Chairman, National Association of Home Help Organisers.
- Reginald Roberts, Commandant, No. 6 District Police Training Centre.
- Thomas Roberts, Head Forester, Cowdray Estate, Midhurst, Sussex.
- Ethel Maud Robinson, Senior Lady Editorial Assistant, Debrett's Peerage.
- Captain Wilfrid Robson, lately District Officer, Worcestershire Agricultural Executive Committee.
- Kathleen Jean Alexander Ross, Organiser, Large Burgh of Arbroath, Women's Voluntary Services.
- Leonard Rushforth, MIEE, Head of Section, Research Laboratory, British Thomson-Houston Ltd., Rugby.
- George Russell, Breeder of the modern coloured lupins. For services to horticulture.
- Charles Reginald Salmon, Grade 3 Officer, Ministry of Labour & National Service.
- Geoffrey Arthur Maurice Sargent, Land Agent and Valuer, War Office.
- Oliver Stephen Scott, Superintendent and Depute Chief Constable, Paisley Burgh Police.
- Victor Henry Scott, Supervising Examiner for Driving Tests, Ministry of Transport.
- Harry Balmforth Shaw, Commandant, Oldham Special Constabulary.
- Robert Lionel Shearer, Senior Executive Officer, Board of Trade.
- Hubert Ernest Shepherd, LDS, Commandant, Metropolitan Special Constabulary.
- Percy Sheridan, Traffic Manager, City of Oxford Motor Services.
- Jessie Cameron Shiels, Higher Executive Officer, Scottish Home Department.
- Florence Elsie Shinner, Chief Superintendent of Typists, Colonial Office.
- Reuben Edward Simpson, Senior Executive Officer, Ministry of Food.
- Cecil William Skinner, Assistant Superintendent Engineer, Transmitters, British Broadcasting Corporation.
- Arthur Henry Smith, Clerk to the Lord Chief Justice of England.
- Edmund Smith, Senior Trustee, National Association of Operative Plasterers.
- Joseph Smith, Chief Officer, Rotherham Fire Brigade.
- Walter Leopold Smith, Senior Executive Officer, Board of Inland Revenue.
- Winifred Jacob-Smith, Women's Land Army County Organiser, North Riding of Yorkshire.
- William John Sparey, Manager, Electrical Department, Silley, Cox & Co. Ltd., Falmouth.
- Wilfrid Leslie Sparks, Technical Director, Sexton, Son & Everard Ltd., Norwich.
- Derrick Edwin Speigal, Base Engineering Superintendent, British Overseas Airways Corporation.
- William Ernest Spence, District Delegate, Amalgamated Society of Woodworkers, Humber District.
- Algernon William Stevens, Senior Executive Officer, Ministry of Transport.
- William Stevens, Member of the National Executive Council of the National Union of Public Employees.
- Robert Stewart, Staff Officer, Ministry of Labour & National Insurance, Northern Ireland.
- Alban Maurice Sticklan, Warden, Welfare Department of the London County Council.
- Reginald Henry Stone, lately Higher Clerical Officer, Ministry of Supply.
- Marjorie Anne Stotesbury, Higher Executive Officer, Board of Trade.
- William Alexander Stuart, lately Higher Executive Officer, Board of Trade.
- Dorothy Stutfield, Superintendent of Typists, Air Ministry.
- Captain Frederick Summers, Master, SS Brika, F.C. Strick & Co.
- James John Symons, Chief Male Nurse, Warlingham Park Hospital, Surrey.
- James Talbot, Senior Executive Officer, Ministry of Pensions.
- Ernest James Taphouse, JP, Manager of the Blanket Finishing Department, Charles Early & Co. Witney.
- David Taylor, Chief Instructor, Department of Operating Manager (Central Road Services), London Transport Executive.
- Francis Joseph Taylor, Manager, Redditch Employment Exchange, Ministry of Labour & National Service.
- George Richard Taylor, Senior Executive Officer, Ministry of Fuel & Power.
- Violet Mona Taylor, JP. For services to the Young Women's Christian Association, Tyneside.
- Florence Ethel Beatrice Timonen, Personal Assistant to the Chairman, British Electricity Authority.
- Mary Barrett Towndrow, Civil Assistant, War Office.
- Walter Charles Tricker, Grade III Officer, Branch B, Foreign Service.
- Mary Elizabeth Tuck, Member, Lincoln Local Employment Committee.
- Evelyn Mary Ulyatt, Administrator, Women's Voluntary Services, South-East Asia.
- George Whalley Wakeford, AMINA, Director of the School of Navigation, University College, Southampton.
- Edgar Orgill Walker, lately Headmaster, Spring Lane Junior School, Northampton.
- John Goodrich Walker, General Secretary, Royal Engineers Old Comrades Association.
- Major Herbert Edward Wallis, lately Senior Assistant, German Section, Foreign Office.
- John Maurice Walshe, AMIEE, Works Engineer, Belliss & Morcom Ltd., Birmingham.
- Reginald William Ward, Experimental Designer, Gloster Aircraft Company Ltd.
- James Hamilton Warnock, Governor of the West of Scotland Agricultural College.
- George Patrick Houston Watson, FRIBA, Senior Investigating Officer, Royal Commission on Ancient & Historical Monuments, (Scotland).
- William Rueben Watson, Assistant to the Commercial Superintendent, Eastern Region, Railway Executive.
- Agnes Baillie White, Executive Officer, Allied Commission for Austria, British Element.
- Francis Henry Whitehead, MRCS LRCP, Chairman, Wandsworth & Battersea War Pensions Committee.
- Doris Lizzie Mary Whiteman, Higher Executive Officer, War Damage Commission & Central Land Board.
- John Whiteside, Vice-President, Bridlington & District Savings Committee.
- Dalby Walter Harry Wickson, Passport Officer in the Office of the United Kingdom High Commissioner, Cape Town.
- Benjamin Richard Williams, Higher Executive Officer, National Assistance Board.
- Thomas Charles Richard Willis, Assistant Regional Manager, London (South Western) Region, War Damage Commission & Central Land Board.
- Winifred Wilson, Higher Clerical Officer, Telephone Manager's Office, Middlesbrough, Yorkshire.
- Captain Maurice Wise, Assistant Secretary, Territorial & Auxiliary Forces Association, County of Middlesex.
- Osborne Stanley Witcombe, Higher Clerical Officer, Swansea Depot, Trinity House.
- Albert James Wood, Secretary of the National Sanatorium, Benenden.
- William Woodall, Secretary of the Condensed Milk Pool Ltd.
- Magdalen Agnes Woods, Grade 4 Officer, Ministry of Labour & National Service.
- Grace Woodward, District Nurse Midwife, Bacton, District of East Suffolk.
- Kenneth Wright, Inspector of Taxes, Board of Inland Revenue.
- Maud Ellen Wright, Higher Executive Officer, Board of Trade.
- Charles Ernest Wylie, JP, lately Member, Buckinghamshire Agricultural Executive Committee.
- William Yeardye, Grade 3 Officer, Ministry of Labour & National Service.
- Aziz Mir Arjumand, Munshi of His Majesty's Consulate at Kermanshah.
- Arthur Robert Cackett, His Majesty's Vice-Consul at Basle.
- Gervase de la Poer Cassels, Chief Inspector, Ministry of the Interior, Government of Cyrenaica.
- Winifred Annie Coate, British subject resident in the Hashemite Kingdom of the Jordan.
- Nicholas Hector Economies, British subject resident in Athens.
- Edward Alfred Edwards, British Vice-Consul at Smyrna.
- Stewart Hunter Evans, lately British Vice-Consul at Galveston.
- Henry Wilfred Glockler, British subject resident in the Lebanon.
- Alice Maud Goddard, Matron of the Samaritano Hospital at São Paulo.
- Zygmund Horn, Officer of Forestry & Fisheries, British Administration, Eritrea.
- Doris May Hudson, Administrative Assistant at His Majesty's Embassy at Washington.
- Ruth Somerville King, British subject resident in Egypt.
- Walter Ivan Lake, lately His Majesty's Consul at Palma de Mallorca.
- George Lange, Ministry of Works Representative in Moscow.
- John William Lee, His Majesty's Vice-Consul at Amsterdam.
- Daniel James Lloyd, Archivist and Accountant at His Majesty's Legation at Bucharest.
- Thomas Holt Lloyd, British subject resident in Trieste.
- Marie Myllin Morton, Assistant Administration Officer, Office of the Commissioner-General for His Majesty's Government in the United Kingdom in South-East Asia.
- Ethel Parker, Principal, Church Missionary Society Girls School, Wad Medani, Blue Nile Province, Sudan.
- Alfred George Porter, British subject, resident in the Argentine Republic.
- The Reverend William Daniel Reynolds, Head of the Baptist Missionary Society in Leopoldville.
- John James Sparks, LMS, British Vice-Consul at Coatzacoalcos.
- Leve Steventon, lately British Vice-Consul at Mukden.
- Brigadier Leslie Clayson Thomas, Officer Commanding the Salvation Army in Burma.
- Leonard Saville Wallgate, Director of Messrs. Reckitt & Colman in Denmark.
- Camilla Fugl Wiley, Secretary in the Visa Section of His Majesty's Embassy at Oslo.
- Marion Ellen Lea Allnutt. For social welfare services in the State of South Australia.
- Armadale Charles Anderson, formerly a Head Teacher, Education Department, State of Tasmania.
- Edith Blanche Anderson, formerly Matron, Northfield Mental Hospital, State of South Australia.
- Councillor William Cumming, of Traralgon Shire Council, State of Victoria.
- John Daniel Doggett, of Hobart, State of Tasmania. For services to the community.
- William Daniel Gale, Acting Director of Public Relations, Southern Rhodesia.
- Victor Charles George Gatti, Chief Clerk, Royal Empire Society.
- Agnes Grace Gillespie, MB ChB, Medical Missionary, Mary Calvert Holdsworth Memorial Hospital, Mysore City, India.
- John Gluis, MA, Headmaster and Principal, Unley High School, State of South Australia.
- William Frederick Howell, Senior Works Manager, Messrs. Jessop & Co. Ltd., Calcutta, India.
- George Harold Johnson. For services to the British Empire Service League, Southern Rhodesia.
- Adam Sutherland MacLeod, Driller, Public Works Department, Bechuanaland Protectorate.
- William Margolis. For services to Industry in Southern Rhodesia.
- Councillor John Stewart Mathieson, JP, of Winchelsea Shire Council, State of Victoria.
- Evelyn Rose Morey, Matron, Lachlan Park Mental Hospital, State of Tasmania.
- Councillor Joseph Brook Pridmore, JP, Yarra Ward, Hawthorn City Council, State of Victoria.
- John Francis Brownlee Purcell, District Officer, Swaziland.
- Harold Raymond. For services to the Institute for the Blind, Deaf & Dumb, State of South Australia.
- Alexander Frederick Reid, JP. For social welfare services in Wodonga, State of Victoria.
- Fanny Dorothy Sanders. For social welfare services in Bulawayo, Southern Rhodesia.
- Eileen Adelaide Stokes, Matron, The Princess Margaret Hospital for Children, Perth, State of Western Australia.
- Walter Edward Thurlow. For services in connection with the development of the Mazoe Valley, and particularly of Bindura, Southern Rhodesia.
- Doris Ethel Trousdale, Matron of the Lady Rodwell Maternity Home, Bulawayo, Southern Rhodesia.
- Isaac Kwadjo Agyeman. For public services in the Gold Coast.
- Akiwande Akiwumi, Inspector of Mines, Sierra Leone.
- Annie Maude Locker-Allen, Head Teacher, Basseterre Girls School, St. Kitts, Leeward Islands.
- Gwendoline Edith Atherton, Principal, Suva Indian Girls Intermediate School, Fiji.
- John Axisa, Director of Emigration, Malta.
- Marjorie Marion Balch, lately Colonial Administrative Service, Assistant Financial Secretary, Kenya.
- Georgiana Olivia Beckles. For public services in Trinidad.
- Louisa Margaret Benade, Nursing Sister, Dutch Reformed Church Mission, Nyasaland.
- Robert Staveley Boumphrey, Colonial Audit Service, for services as Auditor, Falkland Islands.
- Stancia May Bridge. For public services in Bermuda.
- Eric Murray Brown, Assistant Conservator of Forests, Jamaica.
- Norah Bell Burton, Headmistress of St. Michael's Girls School, Barbados.
- Vaikunthlal Motiran Clerk. For public services in Uganda.
- Nathaniel Onesimus Cofie, lately Chief Clerk, Government Printing Department, Gold Coast.
- Douglas John Collister. For public services in Nigeria.
- Thomas Lochie Dennison. For public services in Nigeria.
- Arthur Joseph Edwards, lately Chief Revenue Inspector, Gibraltar.
- William Henry Especkerman, Assistant to the Governor's Private Secretary, Singapore.
- Arthur Griffiths Farr, MRCS LRCP MB BChir, Colonial Medical Service, Acting-Senior Medical Officer, Tanganyika.
- Major Arthur Reynold Foster. Superintendent of Prisons, Barbados.
- Beatrice Marion Foulger. For public services in Singapore.
- Fung Vui Kong, Superscale Grade "A" Clerical Officer, North Borneo.
- Findley Louis Germain, Sergeant Major of Police, Seychelles.
- Constance Goh (Mrs Goh Kok Kee). For public services in Singapore.
- Albert Edward Gresty. For public services in Nigeria.
- The Reverend Alfred Thomas Hill, Headmaster of the Methodist Mission School, Pawa, British Solomon Islands Protectorate.
- Ida Annie Hill, Sister, Owerri and Rivers Area, Church Missionary Society, Nigeria.
- Rosamond Euphemia Hilton, lately Grade I Clerk, Jamaica Agricultural Society, Jamaica.
- Kathleen Winifred Howard, Queen Elizabeth's Colonial Nursing Service, Public Health Matron Grade I, Singapore.
- Eugenie Dorothy Hughes, FRIBA. For public services in Kenya.
- Seyfu Tamba Jammeh, District Head, Upper Baddibu, Central Division, Gambia.
- Major Robert George Jones, ARCM LRCM, Director of Music, Jamaica Military Band, Jamaica.
- Ferdinand Jean July, County Sanitary Inspector, Berbice, British Guiana.
- Athole Stephen Horsford Kemp, Colonial Administrative Service, Acting Administrative Officer, Segamat, Federation of Malaya.
- Frederick William Knight, Executive Officer, Crown Agents for the Colonies.
- Apostplos Constanti Kontos, Administrative Assistant, Grade I, Cyprus.
- Sydney Alfred Lee, Inspector of Telephones, Fiji.
- Lo Pak Wai, Superintendent of Mails, General Post Office, Hong Kong.
- William Marcus Lopey, Headmaster of St. Vincent Grammar School, Windward Islands.
- Pilane Godokandegai Michael George Mahindasa, Teacher, St. Francis Institution, Malacca, Federation of Malaya.
- Beatrice Winifred Mercer. For public services in the Falkland Islands.
- Frederick William Moore, AMIMechE, Inspecting Engineer, Crown Agents for the Colonies.
- Dayabhai Govindbhai Patel, Chief Sanitary Inspector, Aden.
- Thomas Leslie Peet, District Commandant, Police Reserve, Kenya.
- Mutukrishnan Tevanathan Pillay, Accountant, Treasury, Singapore.
- George Basil Popov, Field Officer, Desert Locust Survey, East Africa High Commission.
- Enche Abdul Rahman bin Haji Mohyiddin, Head Malay Teacher, Sultan Idris Training College, Federation of Malaya.
- Idea Roblet, Charge Nurse, Civil Hospital, Medical & Health Department, Mauritius.
- Donald Alexander Ross, Superintendent of Works (Mechanical), Public Works Department, Sierra Leone.
- Barbara Saben. For public services in Uganda.
- Joseph George Sackey, lately Chief Clerk, Prisons Department, Gold Coast.
- Michael Angelo Saliba, Director, Approved School, Malta.
- Abang Samsudin bin Abang Matusin, Native Officer, Sarawak.
- Benjamin James Sealy. For public services in Trinidad.
- Eileen Margaret Skinner. For public services in Nyasaland.
- William Adolphus Small, Senior Surveyor, Gambia.
- Frederic Vernon Stevens, Headmaster, Mitsis School, Lemythou, Cyprus.
- Shemuel John Egertori Stober, Superintendent of Prisons, Nigeria.
- Isabella Jessie Phillipson Stow, lately Sister, Rhodesia Railway Nursing Service, Northern Rhodesia.
- Lily Rebecca Thrush, Medical Sister, Church Missionary Society, Ngara District, Tanganyika.
- Gladys Ella Van Hees. For public services in Northern Rhodesia.
- Waruhiu wa Kunga, Divisional Chief, Kenya.
- Alaistair Maitland Watermeyer, Road Superintendent, Public Works Department, Tanganyika.
- Edward Michael Wilson, Colonial Administrative Service, District Commissioner, Somaliland Protectorate.

Honorary Members

- Saw Seong Peck, Chief Clerk, Labour Department, Perak, Federation of Malaya.
- Esien Enian Esien, lately Supervising Teacher, Education Department, Nigeria.
- Joseph Adeyani Ojo, lately Master Grade I, King's College, Lagos, Nigeria.
- Samuel Ali Oloko, Accountant, Agricultural Department, Nigeria.
- Alice Okon. For public services in Nigeria.
- Haid Deria, Elder of the Habr Yunis, Somaliland Protectorate.
- Warsama Ali Obseyeh, Elder of the Dolbahanta, Somaliland Protectorate.
- The Reverend Daudi Machina, Clergyman in the Universities Mission to Central Africa, Tanganyika.
- Majebere Bin Masanja, Chief of Mwagalla, Tanganyika.
- Zekeria Mungonya, Enganzi of Ankole, Uganda.

=== Order of the Companions of Honour (CH) ===
- The Right Honourable Sir Richard Stafford Cripps, FRS KC, lately Chancellor of the Exchequer.
- The Right Honourable Robert Gordon Menzies, KC, Prime Minister of the Commonwealth of Australia.

=== British Empire Medals (BEM) ===
Military Division

Royal Navy

- Chief Radio Electrician John Albon, P/MX 759136.
- Chief Petty Officer William Pettit Coop, P/JX 142609.
- Marine John Basil Corrigan, Ch.X 4580, Royal Marines.
- Chief Petty Officer Airman (Ordnance) Lancelot Wesley Edwards, L/FX 77062.
- Stores Chief Petty Officer William Angus Finch, D/MX 49035.
- Chief Petty Officer Steward George Henry Hallett, D/LX 21753.
- Chief Petty Officer Cook (S) Henry Holdforth. P/MX 49831.
- Chief Yeoman of Signals John William Jennings, P/JX 131989.
- Ordnance Artificer 1st Class Frederick George King, D/MX 48129.
- Quartermaster Sergeant Reginald George Long, RMB/X 61, LRAM, Royal Marine Band.
- Chief Shipwright Victor George Mann, P/MX 47452.
- Chief Engine Room Artificer Ronald Francis Manning, C/MX 46030.
- Chief Petty Officer Writer Harold Wilfred Miller, P/MX 48791.
- Chief Wren Steward (O) Elsie Alice Morphy, 2493, Women's Royal Naval Service.
- Engine Room Artificer 3rd Class Philip Stanley Peter Muir, C/MX 73876.
- Able Seaman Charles Richard Nixon, C/KX 659163.
- Chief Petty Officer Ernest Herbert George Oakshatt, P/J 115070.
- Sick Berth Chief Petty Officer James O'Regan, C/MX 50461.
- Chief Petty Officer Michael Joseph O'Sullivan, DSM D/JX 132003.
- Chief Wren Cook (S) Janet Ramsay, 32025, Women's Royal Naval Service.
- Mechanician 1st Class William Wilfred Reading, D/KX 95894.
- Sick Berth Petty Officer Yunos bin Mohamed Salleh, SE/X 338, Malayan Royal Naval Volunteer Reserve.
- Ordnance Artificer 1st Class John Edward Saloway, P/MX 53571.
- Chief Petty Officer Writer Harold Edward Sharp, C/MX 59832.
- Stores Chief Petty Officer (S) Herbert Garth Stone, D/MX 58662.
- Colour Sergeant Albert Ernest Tomkins, Ch/X 1512, Royal Marines.
- Chief Petty Officer Telegraphist James Irving Turnbull, WR. 2147, Royal Navy Volunteer (Wireless) Reserve.
- Mechanician 1st Class Harry Leonard Wenham, P/KX 96914.
- Chief Petty Officer Hugh Meirion Williams, DSM, D/JX 126604.
- Chief Engine Room Artificer Edward Sidney James Wilshere, P/MX 47841.
- Chief Petty Officer Frederick Wilson, P/JX 131536.
- Stores Chief Petty Officer Harry Garrod, P/MX.59634. In recognition of non-operational services in Japan in connection with operations in Korea.
- Acting Leader Stoker Mechanic Maurice James Kirk, P/SKX. 833619. In recognition of Operational Minesweeping service.

Army

- No. 818584 Battery Quartermaster-Sergeant Arthur Anker, Royal Regiment of Artillery.
- No. NA/26292 Regimental Sergeant-Major Oseni Bama, West African Army Ordnance Corps.
- No. 22262278 Sergeant Herbert Barker, Royal Regiment of Artillery, Territorial Army.
- No. S/14457363 Sergeant Alec James Carpenter, Royal Army Service Corps.
- No. 5392839 Staff Sergeant Joseph Arthur Castle, Corps of Royal Engineers.
- No. 14444491 Sergeant Gerald Chapman, Royal Corps of Signals.
- No. NA/24682 Battery Sergeant-Major Mursal Doba, The Nigeria Regiment, Royal West African Frontier Force.
- No. 7586420 Warrant Officer Class II (acting) Reginald Dobson, Royal Electrical & Mechanical Engineers.
- No. 5567312 Warrant Officer Class I (acting) Ronald James Donkin, Royal Army Ordnance Corps.
- No. 2038279 Staff Sergeant (Artillery Clerk) William Albert Franklin, Royal Regiment of Artillery, Territorial Army.
- No. 1868131 Staff-Sergeant Frank Geoghegan, Corps of Royal Engineers.
- No. SLA/37037 Band Sergeant-Major William Harding, The Sierra Leone Regiment, Royal West African Frontier Force.
- No. 22200692 Corporal Morris Frederick Howard Harper, Royal Electrical & Mechanical Engineers.
- No. 6199886 Colour-Sergeant Charles Holdford, The Middlesex Regiment (Duke of Cambridge's Own).
- No. 892273 Staff-Sergeant Cecil Christopher Hutchison, Royal Regiment of Artillery, Territorial Army.
- No. R.494 Lance-Corporal Kamala son of Wasi, East African Armoured Corps.
- Company Quartermaster-Sergeant Abdul Karim bin Haji Abdul Jabbar, Infantry Company, Singapore Volunteer Corps.
- No. 14644886 Staff-Sergeant Frank Kennedy, Corps of Royal Engineers.
- No. S/14275936 Staff-Sergeant George Ernest Latham, Royal Army Service Corps.
- No. W/163352 Sergeant Joan Margaret Mackenzie, Women's Royal Army Corps.
- No. 22211322 Warrant Officer Class II (acting) Raymond William McColl, Corps of Royal Engineers.
- No. W/44335 Sergeant Margaret McCue, Women's Royal Army Corps.
- No. 6284696 Sergeant Cyril Robert McKay, MM, Intelligence Corps.
- No. S/2596160 Staff-Sergeant Robert Brown Millar, Royal Army Service Corps, Territorial Army.
- No. 2992710 Colour-Sergeant Gordon Ross Mitchell, Scots Guards.
- No. GC/10923 Company Sergeant-Major Salifu Moshie, The Gold Coast Regiment.
- No. SR/1197 Company Sergeant-Major Mwaniki son of Kitee, East African Army Ordnance Corps.
- No. N/6964 Regimental Sergeant-Major Mwanzia Nganda, The King's African Rifles.
- No. 2872781 Colour-Sergeant William Ogg, The Gordon Highlanders, Territorial Army.
- No. 3953369 Sergeant Dennis O'Keefe, The Welch Regiment, Territorial Army.
- No. GC/32961 Company Sergeant-Major John Alfred Opoku, West African Army Medical Corps.
- No. 2717690 Colour Sergeant Joseph Parke, Irish Guards.
- No. W/4100 Company Quartermaster-Sergeant (acting) Gwendoline Olive Peary, Women's Royal Army Corps, Territorial Army.
- No. NA/28152 Bombardier Garuba Rara, Royal West African Frontier Force.
- No. 4273900 Sergeant Russell Reddish, Army Catering Corps.
- No. 886027 Warrant Officer Class II (acting) George Harry Rogers, Corps of Royal Military Police.
- No. 2323857 Sergeant (acting) Eric Rumford, Royal Corps of Signals.
- No. S/824440 Staff-Sergeant Alfred Benjamin Smedley, Royal Army Service Corps.
- No. 794717 Battery Quartermaster-Sergeant John Edward Stead, Royal Regiment of Artillery, Territorial Army.
- No. 1482388 Bombardier William Story, Royal Regiment of Artillery.
- No. 7670564 Staff-Sergeant Henry Talbot, Royal Army Pay Corps.
- No. W/22725 Sergeant Margaret Turncock, Women's Royal Army Corps, Territorial Army.
- No. 6642112 Company Quartermaster-Sergeant Paul Henry Vandy, The Rifle Brigade (Prince Consort's Own), Territorial Army.
- No. 22304806 Staff-Sergeant Thomas William Ward, Royal Regiment of Artillery, Territorial Army.
- No. S/2689209 Staff-Sergeant Charles William Webb, Royal Army Service Corps, Territorial Army.
- No. T/14441067 Corporal Joseph White, Royal Army Service Corps.
- No. 5932916 Squadron Quartermaster-Sergeant Jack Wilderspin, Royal Corps of Signals.
- No. 2732313 Colour Sergeant (acting) Arthur Leslie Williams, Welsh Guards.
- No. T/14449233 Staff-Sergeant Leonard George Williams, Royal Army Service Corps.
- No. 21182092 Sergeant (acting) Walter James Ernest Taylor, Royal Army Service Corps. In recognition of non-operational services in Japan in connection with operations in Korea.

Royal Air Force

- 523368 Flight Sergeant Ernest William Browning.
- 534474 Flight Sergeant George Eric Davis.
- 562119 Flight Sergeant William Foster.
- 561016 Flight Sergeant (now Acting Warrant Officer) Edgar Hardisty.
- 966405 Flight Sergeant James Edwin Lowe.
- 1356699 Flight Sergeant Robert Alfred Masters.
- 365274 Flight Sergeant Frederick George Miller.
- 620332 Flight Sergeant Walter James Rousseau.
- 561215 Flight Sergeant William Henry Steer.
- 561636. Flight Sergeant Ronald Stephens.
- 990827 Flight Sergeant Walter Tomlinson.
- 2683303 Acting Flight Sergeant Henry John Henderson, Royal Auxiliary Air Force.
- 1202497 Acting Flight Sergeant Benjamin Robinson.
- 591368 Acting Flight Sergeant Laurence Allah Wright.
- 569364 Sergeant Charles Henry Hull Allen.
- 571118 Sergeant Roy Gerald Carey.
- 632023 Sergeant Leslie Dring.
- 1455517 Sergeant Henry Thomas Hathaway.
- 522623 Sergeant Horace Peter Howell.
- 649682 Sergeant Thomas Edward King.
- 568180 Sergeant Alfred Henry Landry.
- 572776 Sergeant Ralph Martin Peto.
- 1612757 Sergeant Kenneth William Russell.
- 622113 Acting Sergeant Fred Cousins.
- 630312 Corporal John Robert Clay.
- 574331 Corporal Thomas Edward Dean.
- 529969 Corporal George William Marshall.
- 1182422 Corporal John Alfred Stannard.
- 4019859 Acting Corporal Denis William Mitchell.
- 483324 Leading Aircraftwoman Maisie Edna Dabinett, Women's Royal Air Force.

Civil Division

United Kingdom

- Herbert Abbs, DSM, Station Officer, HM Coastguard, Aldeburgh, Suffolk.
- Herbert Abel, Head Chancery Servant, HM Embassy, Oslo.
- John Henry Adams, DCM, Chief Supervisor (M), Post Office Telephone Exchange, Exeter. (Exmouth.)
- Alexander Fraser Allan, Inspector and Deputy Chief Constable, Caithness Constabulary. (Wick.)
- Byron Lloyd Allington, Depot Manager, House Coal Distribution Scheme, Grimsby.
- Anne Blanche Anstie. For welfare services to members of the Forces in Devizes.
- Henry Hartley Appleyard, Screenhand, Whitewood Colliery, North Eastern Division, National Coal Board. (Normanton, Yorkshire.)
- Robert B. Young Baird, Foreman Maintenance Engineer, Glenboig Union Fire Clay Co. Ltd. (Glenboig, Lanarkshire.)
- Marion Cray Balmain, Centre Organiser, Wishaw, Women's Voluntary Services.
- Frederick George Baynes, Senior Foreman, Steel Tube Mill, Wellington Tube Works. (Tipton.)
- James Beardsley, Dataller, Shipley Colliery, East Midlands Division, National Coal Board. (Ilkeston, Derbyshire.)
- Elsie Beaumont, Warden, Women's Land Army Hostel, Sherburn.
- Frank Beckett, Senior Upholsterer and Trimmer, Vauxhall Motors Ltd. (Luton.)
- William Bedford, Chargehand Field Worker, Military Engineering Experimental Establishment, Ministry of Supply, Christchurch. (Bournemouth.)
- John Beggs, Quartermaster, SS City of Norwich, Hall Line Ltd. (Harrogate.)
- Jack Bennett, Detective Inspector, East Riding Constabulary. (Beverley.)
- William James Bewers, Chargeman, Grade III, HM Boom Defence Depot, Malta.
- William Binnie, General Foreman, Gas Works, Aberdeen, Scottish Gas Board
- Charles Gilbert Birch, Mate-in-Charge, Royal Navy Armament Depot, Bull Point. (Plymouth.)
- Alexander Charles Blay, Section Inspector, N.4 Line, British Overseas Airways Corporation. (Marchwood, Hampshire.)
- Arthur James Blee, Inspector of Riggers, HM Dockyard, Sheerness. (Minster.)
- Alfred John Boon, Garage Foreman, Southern National Omnibus Co. Ltd., Road Passenger Executive. (Weymouth.)
- Alfred Frederick Thomas Brider, Boiler House Foreman, South Wales Division, British Electricity Authority. (Newport.)
- Frank Bridgwater, Head Mainlayer, Bristol Sub-Division, South Western Gas Board (Bristol.)
- John Thomas Brighton, Deputy Overman, Harraton Colliery, Durham Division, National Coal Board. (Chester-le-Street.)
- John J. Brown, Collector, Street Savings Group, Belfast.
- Kate Brown, Honorary Collector, Beech Hill Street Savings Group, Luton.
- Joseph Arthur Bryan, Temporary Draughtsman, HM Gunnery School, Devonport (Saltash, Cornwall.)
- Herbert Bullough, Shaftman, Wheatsheaf Colliery, North Western Division, National Coal Board. (Outwood, Manchester.)
- James Daniel Butler, Packer and Porter, Supplies Department, General Post Office. (Romford, Essex.)
- William Campbell, Carpenter, SS Capetown Castle, Union-Castle Mail Steamship Co. Ltd. (Dagenham, Essex.)
- Joseph William Chaney, Staff Foreman, North Thames Gas Board (Regents Park, N.W.1.)
- William Henry Chinn, Foundry Worker, J. Lassam & Co. Ltd. (Cardiff.)
- Frank Bernard Clegg, Chargehand, Whipp & Bourne Ltd., Castleton. (Rochdale.)
- Charles William Clubley, Works Foreman, Spalding, East Midlands Gas Board (Spalding, Lincolnshire.)
- Norman Coke, Chief Cook, MV Anchises, Alfred Holt & Co. (Lanark.)
- George Coleman, lately Sub-Postmaster, Chart Sutton, Maidstone, Kent.
- Maria Leontine Coles, Manageress, YMCA Canteen, RAF Yatesbury.
- Richard Collick, Foreman of Works, Imperial War Graves Commission, North West European District.
- John Connelly, Salvage Worker, Primrose Hill Colliery, North Eastern Division, National Coal Board. (Methley, near Leeds.)
- Herbert James Conyard. Moulder and Coremaker, Vickers-Armstrongs Ltd. (Crayford, Kent.)
- Beatrice Jessie Denny-Cooke, Area Officer, Loddon Rural District, Women's Voluntary Services. (Norwich.)
- John Cosh, Chargehand, Radar Research & Development Establishment, Ministry of Supply, Malvern.
- George Henry Cowley, Conveyor Attendant, Percival Lane Power Station, Runcorn, Merseyside & North Wales Division, British Electricity Authority. (Runcorn, Cheshire.)
- Kate Creighton. Centre Organiser, Swinton, Women's Voluntary Services.
- Frederick Cuffley, Permanent Labourer, Port of London Authority. (South Benfleet, Essex.)
- John Robert Curry, JP, Goods Guard, Railway Executive, North Eastern Region. (Blyth.)
- Alfred William Curtis, Builders Foreman, Hannover, Control Commission for Germany.
- Richard Thomas Davies, Coke Oven Foreman, Cargo Fleet Iron Co. Ltd., Middlesbrough. (South Bank, Yorkshire.)
- Frederick John Davis, Supervisor I (Transport), Düsseldorf, Control Commission for Germany.
- George Devon, lately Foreman Engineer, A. & J. Inglis Ltd., Glasgow.
- Charles Donnelly, JP, Assistant Shearer, Lanarkshire Steel Co. Ltd. (Motherwell.)
- George Down, Mason, Exeter.
- Robert Duncan, Senior Company Officer, Perth & Kinross Fire Brigade. (Perth.)
- Evelyn Joyce Dunlop, Member, Women's Land Army, Albrighton, Wolverhampton.
- George Ely, Dock Worker, Liverpool, Birkenhead.
- Albert Edward Payers, Office Keeper, Department of the Serjeant at Arms, House of Commons.
- Charles Henry Firman, Boatswain, SS British Cavalier, British Tanker Company. (South Shields.)
- Victor Allen Fisher, lately Foreman Craftsman, British Museum. (Now Temporary Craftsman, Class I.) (Hanwell, W.7.)
- James Fowler, Oncost Worker, Woolmet Colliery, Scottish Division, National Coal Board. (Portobello.)
- Frederick Thomas French, Chargeman Stripper, Kingsbury Colliery, West Midlands Division, National Coal Board. (Tamworth.)
- Alick Gardner, Chief Officer, Works Fire Brigade, Armstrong-Siddeley Motors Ltd., Coventry.
- Frederick Ralph Girdlestone, Chargehand Fitter, No. 4 Maintenance Unit, Royal Air Force, Ruislip. (Ickenham.)
- Joyce Mary Gleadow, Centre Organiser, Pickering Urban District & Rural District, Women's Voluntary Services.
- Fred Goodier, Leading Blacksmith, Northwich, Docks & Inland Waterways Executive.
- Joseph Gough, Chargeman Packer, Rufford Colliery, East Midlands Division, National Coal Board. (Rainworth, near Mansfield.)
- Joseph Byron Graham, Foreman Carver, Green & Vardy, London. (Finchley, N.3.)
- John Grant, Farm Manager, Doonholm, Ayr.
- Edward Graves, Chargehand, Standard Telephones and Cables Ltd. (Ilminster, Somerset.)
- John Gray, Chief Engineman, Steam Trawler William Brady. (Aberdeen.)
- Thomas William Gray, JP, Fireman, Bowhill Colliery, Scottish Division, National Coal Board. (Cardenden, Fife.)
- William George Gray, Head Forester, Forestry Commission. (Oxford.)
- Lily Greenhalgh, Chief Supervisor (F), Head Post Office, Bolton.
- Alan Gridley, Senior Artificer, Department of Scientific & Industrial Research. (Teddington.)
- Mark Owen Griffiths, Foreman Fish Porter, V.J. Travis, Monument Stores. (Petts Wood, Kent.)
- John Hanson, Foreman Driver, Cardiff Group, Road Haulage Executive.
- Thomas Harris, Head Doorkeeper, Department of the Serjeant at Arms, House of Commons. (Hounslow.)
- John Thomas Hathaway, Rolling Mill Foreman, Henry Wiggin & Co. Ltd. (Birmingham.)
- Thomas John Hawkes, Office Keeper, Grade II, Ministry of National Insurance. (New Cross, S.E.14.)
- Sam Healey, lately Technician, Class I, Telephone Manager's Office, Leicester. (Loughborough.)
- Richard William John Helyer, Fireman, London Fire Brigade. (Dalston, E.8.)
- Jean Pringle Henry, Chief Supervisor (F), Belfast Telephone Area.
- Alexander Hodge, Shift Foreman, Cleckheaton Works, North Eastern Gas Board (Cleckheaton, Yorkshire.)
- Allan Houghton, Mate, Royal Army Service Corps Vessel Helford, War Office, Bermuda.
- Harry Arthur Hunstone, Chargehand Electrician, Ocker Hill Generating Station, Midlands Division, British Electricity Authority. (Tipton, Staffordshire.)
- Frederick Charles Hunt, Office Keeper, Grade II, Paymaster General's Office. (Chertsey, Surrey.)
- Frederick Newman Hunter, Boiler House Fitter, Wallasey Power Station, Merseyside & North Wales Division, British Electricity Authority. (Birkenhead.)
- James Boyd Inglis, Foreman Linesman, South Western Division, British Electricity Authority. (Plymouth.)
- Alfred E. Ireland, Deck Hand, Trawler Loch Oskaig. (Hull.)
- Robert Irving, Foreman Estate Workman, Department of Agriculture for Scotland. (Terregles, Dumfriesshire.)
- Edward Robert Jones, Works Superintendent, Colwyn Bay, Wales Gas Board
- John Jones, Fireman, Sneyd Colliery, West Midlands Division, National Coal Board (Stoke-on-Trent.)
- John Henry Jones, Greaser, SS San Cipriano, Eagle Oil and Shipping Company. (Liverpool.)
- Leslie Washington Jones, Organiser and Collector, Savings Group, Lancashire Steel Corporation Ltd., Manchester.
- Walter Jones, Works Foreman, Barker Brothers. (Birmingham.)
- James Kinnear Malcolm Kerr, Postman, Cupar, Fife.
- John King, Construction Fitter, Shell-Mex and BP Ltd. (Aberdeen.)
- Lilly Leah, Weaver, Brocklehurst-Whiston Amalgamated Ltd. (Macclesfield.)
- Ralph Lee, Detective Inspector, Durham Constabulary.
- Alice Lloyd, Honorary Organiser and Collector, Oak Street Savings Group, Oswestry.
- Ernest George Long, Foreman, Aeronautical & General Instruments Ltd. (Morden, Surrey.)
- Edward Longley, Blacksmith, Boldon Colliery, Durham Division, National Coal Board. (Durham.)
- Andrew Hardie Lyon, Tinsmith, James Paterson & Co. Ltd. (Dundee.)
- Jemima Mccafferty, Cook, Argyll & Bute Mental Hospital, Lochgilphead.
- Malcolm Mcdougall, Foreman Welder, Yarrow & Co. Ltd., Glasgow. (Clydebank, Dunbartonshire.)
- Janet Campbell McGowan, Assistant Nurse, Robroyston Hospital, Glasgow.
- Hugh Maclean MacGregor, Instructor Grade III, Letchworth Government Training Centre. (Letchworth.)
- John McMillan McHutcheon, Tunnel Foreman, Cementation Company, Fasnakyle. (Inverness.)
- Joseph Christopher Dickson McKenzie, JP, Garage Hand and Checker, Newcastle upon Tyne, Road Haulage Executive. (Ashington.)
- John MacKinnon, Scale Payment Sub-Post Office Assistant, Applecross, Ross-shire.
- Marion Paterson Macmillan, Woman Head Constable, Royal Ulster Constabulary. (Belfast.)
- Matthew Latty March, Checkweighman, Dudley Colliery, Northern (Northumberland & Cumberland) Division, National Coal Board. (Dudley.)
- William John Marshall, DCM, Warehouse Supervisor, HM Stationery Office. (Islington, N.1.)
- Harold Ewart Mason, Leading Draughtsman, Royal Ordnance Factory, Nottingham.
- John Maxwell, Chargehand Fitter, Ulster Transport Authority. (Belfast.)
- Ernest James May, Boatswain, THV Patricia, Corporation of Trinity House. (Dovercourt.)
- William Daniel Menniss, Driver, South Eastern Division, Road Haulage Executive. (East Dulwich, S.E.22.)
- Fred Mew, Member, Coast Life Saving Corps, Blackgang, Isle of Wight.
- Emma Middleton, Machine Operator, Imperial Chemical Industries Ltd. (Birmingham.)
- Alexander Duffield Morgan, Superintendent of Stores, No. 61 Maintenance Unit, Royal Air Force, Handforth. (Abingdon.)
- Olive Louise Morris, Chief Supervisor of Sorting Assistants, Accountant General's Department, General Post Office. (Walthamstow, E.17.)
- William Henry Morris, Senior Instructor, Army Apprentices School, Arborfield. (Yateley, Surrey.)
- Thomas Moses, Checkweighman, Mainsforth Colliery, Durham Division, National Coal Board. (Ferryhill, Co. Durham.)
- Frank Douglas Murchie, Store Superintendent, Royal Arsenal, Woolwich. (Dagenham, Essex.)
- Frederick Mycock, Foreman Plant Engineer, Joshua Wardle Ltd. (Leek, Staffordshire.)
- William O'Goo, Donkeyman-Greaser, SS Brika, F. C. Strick & Co. (Cardiff.)
- Robert O'Neil, lately Miner, Benhar Colliery, Scottish Division, National Coal Board. (Harthill, Lanarkshire.)
- David L. Page, Relief Signalman, Dunfernpline Lower, Railway Executive (Scottish Region).
- Frederick Paul, Honorary Organiser and Collector, Street Savings Group, Brighton.
- Charles Edward Phillips, Technical Assistant, Royal Ordnance Factory, Blackburn.
- Paramvopillai Balakrishna Pillai, Master of Yard Craft, HM Dockyard, Singapore.
- Lilian Eliza Mary Powell, Manageress of Packing and Despatch Department, Itshide Rubber Co. (Petersfield.)
- Henry Edward Pyke, Postman, Guildford, Surrey.
- Robert Rae, Clerk of Works, War Office, Edinburgh.
- Thomas Redpath, Winding Master, Blackstaff Flax Spinning & Weaving Co. Ltd., Belfast.
- William Henry Reynolds, Chief Inspector, Divisional Operating Superintendent's Office, Railway Executive, North Eastern Region, York.
- Grace Mary Roberts, Supervisor (F), Post Office Telephone Exchange, Chester.
- John Cameron Robinson, JP, Sub-Postmaster, Rookhope Sub-Office, Bishop Auckland.
- Thomas Rochford, Travelling Superintendent Gardener, Imperial War Graves Commission, French District.
- Fred Houldsworth Rycroft, Foreman, Tysons (Contractors) Ltd., Liverpool.
- Ethel May Sharp, Home Help, Kent County Council. (Chatham.)
- Andrew Cunningham Shearer, Foreman Mason Fixer, Webber & Corben. (Tooting, S.W.17.)
- William Arthur Shenton, Demolition Supervisor Grade I, Hamburg, Control. Commission for Germany.
- Matthew Simpson, Back Ripper, Bolsover Colliery, East Midlands Division, National Coal Board. (Chesterfield.)
- Phillip Sidney Skyrme, Senior Assistant Overseer, Office of Admiralty Engineer Overseer, South Yorkshire & North Midland District. (Sheffield.)
- Walter Frederick Feben Smith, Principal Storekeeper, Ministry of Works.(Croydon, Surrey.)
- William Frank Smith, Acting Foreman of Storehouses, Admiralty Storage Depot, Risley. (Glazebrook.)
- Charles Matthew Spittles, Sub-Officer, Buckinghamshire Fire Brigade. (Wendover.)
- James W. Stephens, Sergeant, Royal Ulster Constabulary. For services to the Savings Movement. (Enniskillen.)
- Osten James Stephenson, Foreman, C. A. Parsons Ltd., Newcastle upon Tyne. (Walkergate.)
- Charles Albert Stirling, Plater, Consett Iron Company Ltd. (Blackhill, Co. Durham.)
- Ernest George Stoker, Regimental Quarter-Master Sergeant, Sedbergh School Combined Cadet Force. (Sedbergh.)
- Herbert Strickland, Foreman Electrician, Wm. Jessop & Sons Ltd. (Sheffield.)
- Harold John Summers, Head Foreman, United Dairies Ltd., Chard Junction, Somerset.
- Geraldine Thomas, Member, Women's Land Army, Caernant Farm, Tycroes, Anglesey.
- Fanny Thorne, Agricultural Worker, Preston Candover, Basingstoke.
- Tom Tilly, Radio Operator, HMTS Monarch, General Post Office. (Mablethorpe.)
- Thomas Tippet, Surface Worker, Rising Sun Colliery, Northern (Northumberland & Cumberland) Division, National Coal Board. (Wallsend-on-Tyne.)
- Doris Rosetta Towell, Assistant Supervisor, London Telecommunications Region. (South Harrow.)
- William Albert Towner, Confirmed Leading Man, HM Dockyard, Chatham. (Gillingham.)
- William Beeton Towns, Tool Room Foreman, Acton Bolt Ltd. (Acton, W.3.)
- William Ferguson Turnbull, Chief Petty Officer Instructor, Sea Cadet Corps, Newark Unit.
- Alfred Turner, Technician, Class I, Research Station, General Post Office. (West London. N.W.4.)
- Robert Turner, Foreman, Ministry of Works. (Stirling.)
- Arthur Varley, Bread Bakery Foreman, Matthes, Gorleston. (Great Yarmouth.)
- Fred Robinson Waller, Chargehand Plater, Dorman, Long & Co. Ltd., Middlesbrough. (Stockton-on-Tees.)
- Alfred Ward, Honorary Organiser and Collector, Norcot Estate Savings Group, Reading.
- Mary Ward, Consultant Sister, Docks & Inland Waterways Executive. (Towcester.)
- George Dickson Waring, Chief Inspector, Road Passenger Service, Ulster Transport Authority. (Newtownards, County Down.)
- Leslie Howard Weaver, Assistant II, Ministry of Supply, Malvern.
- Mabel Winifred Webber, Assistant to Regional Organiser, No. 6 Region, Women's Voluntary Services. (Reading.)
- Arthur John Wells, Honorary Collector, Prince of Wales Dry Dock Savings Group, Port Talbot.
- James Western, Boot and Shoe Operative, G. B. Britton & Sons Ltd. (Bristol.)
- Thomas White, Leading Hand, Edinburgh & Leith Flint Glass Works. (Edinburgh.)
- Alfred Whitehead, Telephonist (M), Telephone Exchange. (Salford, Lancashire.)
- Thomas Whitley, JP, Foreman Shipwright, Harland & Wolff Ltd., Belfast.
- Harold Ernest Whorwell, Leading Draughtsman, Ministry of Transport. (Barnes, S.W.13.)
- Ernest Charles Wilkie, Lens Foreman, M. Wiseman & Co. London. (North Wembley.)
- Alexander George Wilkinson, Pattern-Maker, Vulcan Foundry Ltd. (Newton-le-Willows.)
- Wilfred Claude Wilkinson, Electrician, North Eastern Division Electricity Board. (Newcastle upon Tyne.)
- Adam Williams, Ripper, Llay Main Colliery, North Western Division, National Coal Board. (Llay, near Wrexham.)
- James Williams, Class I Jointer, South Eastern Division, Electricity Board. (Rochester, Kent.)
- Robert Richard Williams, Foreman Farm Worker, Ystrad, Denbigh.
- Walter Williams, Sectional Supplies Superintendent, General Post Office. (Finsbury Park, N.4.)
- Frank Willingham, Principal Foreman, Express Dairy Co. (London) Ltd., Cricklewood. (Neasden, N.W.2.)
- Henry Willis, Deputy, Ashington Colliery, Northern (Northumberland & Cumberland) Division, National Coal Board. (Ashington, Northumberland.)
- Jean Wilson, Home Help, Lanark County. (Cambuslang.)
- William Henry Wingham, lately Works Foreman, Haywards Heath Works, South Eastern Gas Board (Haywards Heath, Sussex.)
- Mohammed Yakub, Station Engineer, Royal Air Force Habbaniya, Iraq.

State of Victoria

- Allen James Smith, Head Chauffeur to His Excellency the Governor of Victoria.

Colonial Empire

- Matilda Trapp, Matron, HM Prison Service, British Honduras.
- Sofoclis Nicola Boyiadjis, Mukhtar of Kalopanayiotis, Cyprus.
- Ali Raouf Yousouf, Mukhtar of Louroudjina, Cyprus.
- Socrates Metaxas, Mukhtar of Pelendria, Cyprus.
- Syed Abdul Rashid bin Syed Ali, Pengjhulu, Mukim Triang Hir, Jelebu, Federation of Malaya.
- Kathirippillai Vairavappillai, Stationmaster, Mentakab, Pahang, Federation of Malaya.
- Abdul Rahim bin Mohamed Aikb, Technical Assistant, Telecommunications Department, Ipoh, Federation of Malaya.
- Meli Rokobici, Field Assistant, Department of Agriculture, Fiji.
- Ouseinou Sarr, 1st Grade Quartermaster, Marine Department, Gambia.
- Leung Yeung Lok, Health Inspector, Hong Kong.
- Cheuk Sui Bun, Senior Dresser, Government Medical Service, Hong Kong.
- Davidson Ngimbuini Kunguru, Hospital Assistant, Medical Department, Kenya.
- Andre Dulcidonio Coelho, Cashier, Treasurer's Department, City Council of Nairobi, Kenya.
- George Onaga, Member of the Ngwo Native Authority, Onitsha Province, Nigeria.
- Sam Anekwe Obiekwe, Foreman Grade II, Public Works Department, Nigeria.
- Venu Krishne Nadasan Naidu, Postmaster, Beaufort, North Borneo.
- John Ernest Bankole Weekes, Temporary Draughtsman, Resident Engineers Office, Freetown, Sierra Leone.
- Badokufa s/o Nineka, Third Oracle Chief Warder, Police and Prisons Department, Tanganyika.
- Helen Marie Victorin, Head Teacher of Choiseul Girls Primary School, St. Lucia, Windward Islands.

=== Royal Red Crosses (RRC) ===
Royal Navy

- Barbara Nockolds, ARRC, Acting Matron, Queen Alexandra's Royal Naval Nursing Service.

Army

- Major Ethel Mary Neale (206352), Queen Alexandra's Royal Army Nursing Corps.
- Lieutenant-Colonel (acting) Florence May Smith, ARRC (206434), Queen Alexandra's Royal Army Nursing Corps.

Royal Air Force

- Wing Officer Annie Winifred Marsland, ARRC (5214), Princess Mary's Royal Air Force Nursing Service.

==== Associates of the Royal Red Cross (ARRC) ====
Royal Navy

- Olive Mary Molyneaux, Senior Nursing Sister, Queen Alexandra's Royal Naval Nursing Service.

Army

- Major Nina Alys Buck (206024), Queen Alexandra's Royal Army Nursing Corps.
- Major Daisy Lister (206279), Queen Alexandra's Royal Army Nursing Corps.

Royal Air Force

- Flight Officer Freda Short (5116), Princess Mary's Royal Air Force Nursing Service.

=== Air Force Crosses (AFC) ===
Royal Air Force

- Wing Commander Peter Guy Wykeham-Barnes, DSO OBE DFC (33211).
- Wing Commander John Randall Daniel Braham, DSO DFC (40667).
- Acting Wing Commander Russell Edwin Bell, MVO DFC (0372), Royal Auxiliary Air Force
- Acting Wing Commander Peter Carteret Fletcher, OBE DFC (80028).
- Squadron Leader Reginald Thomas Bainbridge (102569).
- Squadron Leader Robert Bruce Cole, DFC (66483).
- Squadron Leader Leo Charles Evan De Vigne, DSO DFC (113859).
- Squadron Leader John Stafford Howitt, MRCS LRCP (84854).
- Squadron Leader Leonard Horace Lambert, DFC (119791).
- Squadron Leader Edward Lawley McMillan (65561).
- Squadron Leader Raymond Archibald Watts (65530).
- Acting Squadron Leader Michael Terry Wainwright (40346).
- Flight Lieutenant William Nicholas Hugh Brawn, DFC (175648).
- Flight Lieutenant Alec Norman Bristow, DFC (101502).
- Flight Lieutenant Frederick Charles Dray (156665).
- Flight Lieutenant Roger Emett (53248).
- Flight Lieutenant Ben Loraine Garner, DFC (106649).
- Flight Lieutenant Gyon Erleon Heilbron Hackman (123249).
- Flight Lieutenant Frederick Samuel Hazlewood (55087).
- Flight Lieutenant Francis Michael Hegarty (164406).
- Flight Lieutenant Reuben William James Horsley (198177).
- Flight Lieutenant John Kenneth Hough (163220).
- Flight Lieutenant John Alfred William Long (133263).
- Flight Lieutenant Douglas Harold Mackie (171575).
- Flight Lieutenant William Edward Martin, DFC (55101).
- Flight Lieutenant James Lorenzo Nelson (59552).
- Flight Lieutenant Raymond Benjamin Phillips, DFC (177656).
- Flight Lieutenant Basil Arthur Templeman-Rooke, DSO DFC (157102).
- Flight Lieutenant Peter Sherriff, DFC (125575).
- Flight Lieutenant Clifford Alan Sullings (172750).
- Flight Lieutenant Denis Albert Trotman (124478).
- Flight Lieutenant Charles Watkinson, DFC (55069).
- Master Navigator Henry James Baxter (565139).
- Master Navigator Albert John Haygreen (517848).
- Master Signaller Robert Henry Hooley, DFM (751264).
- Master Signaller Cyril Jones, DFM (621518).

Royal Navy

- Lieutenant Alfred Raymond Rawbone.
- Lieutenant Richard Henry Reynolds.

==== Bars to Air Force Cross ====
Royal Air Force

- Wing Commander Hugh Patrick Ruffell Smith, AFC MB BCh MRCS LRCP (23353).

=== Air Force Medals (AFM) ===
Royal Air Force

- 542848 Pilot I Harold Andrew.
- 1601703 Pilot I John Robert Foster.
- 657028 Pilot I Ian Roy Gordon.
- 1318074 Pilot I Claude John Samuel Howard.
- 1800482 Pilot I Leslie Steward Ketcher.
- 1603653 Pilot I Alexander Peter Mackie.
- 573824 Pilot I Douglas Walter Raymond Thompson.
- 1602579 Pilot I Albert Laurent Shaw Welvaert.
- 576523 Signaller I Roy Evan Hardwick.
- 634175 Signaller I Leslie Charles Turnbull.
- 635371 Engineer I Thomas Kennedy, DFM.
- 1079283 Pilot II Frank Harvey.

=== King's Commendations for Valuable Service in the Air ===
Royal Air Force

- Squadron Leader James Robert Wade Blyth, AFC BSc (115103).
- Acting Squadron Leader Richard Ulick Paget de Burgh (118569).
- Acting Squadron Leader Clifford Hardman (53434).
- Acting Squadron Leader Graham Stanway Hulse, DFC (52935).
- Acting Squadron Leader Herbert George Slade (123239).
- Acting Squadron Leader Herbert William Taylor, DFC (47000).
- Flight Lieutenant John Handley Appleton (53931).
- Flight Lieutenant Raymond Baker (52510).
- Flight Lieutenant Harold John William Bareham, DFM (44413).
- Flight Lieutenant Anthony George Brown, DFC (146747).
- Flight Lieutenant Arthur Campey (181221).
- Flight Lieutenant Murray Grant Casselman.(59539).
- Flight Lieutenant David Dattner (182273).
- Flight Lieutenant John Joseph Doyle (135735). (deceased)
- Flight Lieutenant Raymond Cecil Henry Easy (57384).
- Flight Lieutenant Ronald Cyril Everson (52030).
- Flight Lieutenant Kenneth William Dalton-Golding (156681).
- Flight Lieutenant Luigi Giuseppe Hurrell (158724), RAF Reserve of Officers.
- Flight Lieutenant Lancelot Alexander Alister MacKilligin (128629).
- Flight Lieutenant Leslaw Roman Miedzybrodzki (500038).
- Flight Lieutenant James Herbert Christopher Plummer (157863).
- Flight Lieutenant Francis Reid (152503).
- Flight Lieutenant William George Smith (55566).
- Flight Lieutenant James Alexander Stephen (55561).
- Flight Lieutenant Dan Thomas (162531).
- Master Navigator Bernard Weller, DFC (1165351).
- 1600539 Pilot I Noel Edward Cooke.
- 1672028 Signaller I Eric Davies.
- 2209306 Signaller I William Edmund Lowther.
- 1822311 Engineer I Alexander Primrose Fraser.
- 627400 Engineer I Thomas Plumpton Milligan.
- 2360011 Pilot II John Mackenzie.
- 1609526 Navigator II Guy Allen Cohen.
- 1852123 Signaller II Frank Christopher Slee.
- 1904398 Signaller III Jeremiah Corkery.
- 3502564 Leading Aircraftman Thomas Henry John.

Army

- Major Bernard Edward Mills Repton (109305), Royal Artillery.

=== King's Police and Fire Services Medals ===
Police

England and Wales

- Walter Edward Schofield, OBE, Chief Constable, Oldham Borough Police Force.
- Alfred Thomas Neale Evans, OBE, Chief Constable, Pembrokeshire Constabulary.
- John William Barnett, Chief Constable, Leeds City Police Force.
- John Fenlli Roberts, MBE, Chief Constable, Flintshire Constabulary.
- Frank Leonard Bunn, OBE, . Chief Constable, Stoke-on-Trent City Police Force.
- Frederick William Hicks, MBE, Assistant Chief Constable, Bristol City Police Force.
- Edward John Brown, MBE, Chief Superintendent, Birmingham City Police Force.
- Walter James Crombie, Superintendent, Berkshire Constabulary.
- John Sainsbury, Superintendent, Portsmouth City Police Force.
- Leonard Walter King, MBE, Superintendent, Norfolk Constabulary.
- Sidney Thomas Smith, Superintendent. Metropolitan Police.
- William Henry Rudkin, Superintendent, Metropolitan Police.

Scotland

- Donald Angus Ross, OBE, Chief Constable, Argyllshire Constabulary.
- James McCallum, Superintendent, Fife Constabulary.

Northern Ireland

- William James Edward Stoddart, Head Constable, Royal Ulster Constabulary.

Australia

- Stanley Robert Mudie, Inspecting Superintendent, Victoria Police Force.

Former Mandated Territory

- Dhonaill Patrick Macnamara, CPM, Assistant Commissioner of Police, Federation of Malaya.
- Ian Standish Wylie, OBE, Assistant Commissioner of Police, Federation of Malaya.

Occupied Territories Administration

- Bruce Henry Taylor, Superintendent, Eritrea Police Force.

Fire Service

England and Wales

- Edward George Hobbs, Chief Officer. Buckinghamshire Fire Brigade.
- Sidney Albert Phillips, MBE MM. Chief Officer, Eastbourne Fire Brigade.
- Windsor Percy Jorgensen, Divisional Officer, Manchester Fire Brigade.
- Claud Petley, Station Officer (part-time), Kent Fire Brigade.

Scotland

- William Francis McLaughlin, Divisional Officer, Glasgow Fire Brigade.

=== Colonial Police Medals (CPM) ===
In recognition of meritorious service in Malaya and Singapore

- Halim bin Haji Muhamed, Sergeant, Federation of Malaya Police Force.
- Thomas Hamilton, Assistant Superintendent, Federation of Malaya Police Force.
- John Noel Douglas Harrison, Superintendent, Federation of Malaya Police Force.
- John Hedley Hindmarsh, Assistant Superintendent, Federation of Malaya Police Force.
- John James Holmes, Honorary Assistant Superintendent of Auxiliary Police, Federation of Malaya.
- Thomas Horton, Assistant Superintendent, Federation of Malaya Police Force.
- Abdul Jalil bin Haji Aminudin, Assistant Superintendent, Federation of Malaya Police Force.
- Brinley Lewis, Assistant Superintendent, Singapore Police Force.
- Francis Knyvett McNamara, Superintendent, Federation of Malaya Police Force.
- Patrick Henry O'Flynn, Superintendent, Federation of Malaya Police Force.
- Othman bin Jaafar, Auxiliary Police Officer, Federation of Malaya.
- John Jara Raj, Assistant Superintendent, Federation of Malaya Police Force.
- Clifford Maxim Allan Shaw, Assistant Superintendent, Federation of Malaya Police Force.
- Arjan Singh, Chief Inspector, Federation of Malaya Police Force.
- Charles Howard Agabeg Sturge, OBE, Superintendent, Federation of Malaya Police Force.
- Tang Kwan Kun, Assistant Superintendent, Federation of Malaya Police Force.
- John Forest Thompson, Honorary Inspector of Auxiliary Police, Federation of Malaya.
- Wong Chen Chee, late Chief Inspector, Federation of Malaya Police Force.
- Harold John Woolnough, Assistant Superintendent, Federation of Malaya Police Force.
- Mohamed Yatim bin Hussein, Acting Lance Sergeant, Federation of Malaya Police Force.
- Mohamed Yusuf bin Mohamed Shukor, Sub-Inspector, Federation of Malaya Police Force.
- Zon bin Abdul Sukor, Sergeant-Major, Federation of Malaya Police Force.

=== Mentions in Despatches ===
In recognition of services in Operational Minesweeping since the end of the war.

- Lieutenant Ronald Leonard William Lancaster, Royal Navy.
- Chief Yeoman of Signals Albert Ernest Blood, DSM, P/JX.139771.
- Radio Electrical Artificer Third Class Hambleton Mason, P/MX.713941.

== Australia ==
=== Knights Bachelor ===
- Professor Frank Macfarlane Burnet, MD ScD PhD FRACP FRS, director of Walter and Eliza Hall Institute, Melbourne. For services to biological research.
- Charles Lloyd Jones. For services to charitable organisations and to Art.
- David Maughan, KC, of Sydney. For public services.
- Leslie James McConnan, Chief Manager of the National Bank of Australasia.
- Norman Rupert Mighell, CMG, lately Deputy High Commissioner in the United Kingdom for His Majesty's Government in the Commonwealth of Australia.
- Edwin Van-der-Vord Nixon, CMG. For public services, more especially as Director of Finance, Ministry of Munitions, 1940–45.

=== Order of the Bath ===
==== Companions of the Order of the Bath (CB) ====
Military Division

- Major-General John Stewart Whitelaw, CBE, Australian Military Forces.

=== Order of Saint Michael and Saint George ===
==== Companions of the Order of St Michael and St George (CMG) ====
- Douglas Thornley Boyd, Chairman of the Australian Wool Board.

=== Order of the British Empire ===
==== Knights Commander of the Order of the British Empire (KBE) ====
Military Division

Royal Australian Navy

- Vice-Admiral John Augustine Collins, CB.

Army

- Lieutenant-General Vernon Ashton Hobart Sturdee, CB CBE DSO, Australian Military Forces.

Civil Division

- The Honourable Edward McTiernan, a Judge of the High Court of the Commonwealth of Australia.

==== Commanders of the Order of the British Empire (CBE) ====
Military Division

Army

- Brigadier Denzil Macarthur-Onslow, DSO ED, Commonwealth Military Forces.
- Annie Moriah Sage, RRC, Matron-in-Chief, Australian Army Nursing Service.

Royal Australian Air Force

- Air Vice-Marshal Joseph Eric Hewitt, OBE.

Civil Division

- Arthur Sydney Victor Smith, formerly Secretary, Department of Supply and Development, and former Chairman of the Commonwealth Contract Board.

==== Officers of the Order of the British Empire (OBE) ====
Military Division

Royal Australian Navy

- Superintendent (Naval Dockyard Police) Norman Hamon Shaw, Royal Australian Navy (Auxiliary Services).
- Commander John Anthony Walsh.

Army

- Lieutenant-Colonel Donald George McKenzie, Royal Australian Army Service Corps.
- Colonel Ferdinand Henry Wright, VD, Australian Military Forces.

Royal Australian Air Force

- Group Captain Colin Thomas Hannah.
- Matron Alice Jean Wheatley, ARRC, Royal Australian Air Force Nursing Service.

Civil Division

- The Honourable Joseph Palmer Abbott, MC. For services to the wool industry; former member of the Federal Cabinet; and Vice-Chairman of the Australian Wool Board.
- Alfred John Chambers, MBE, Federal President of the T.B. Sailors', Soldiers' and Airmen's Association.
- William Joseph Dawkins, South Australian Representative on the Australian Meat Board.
- Robert David Fitzgerald, of Sydney. For services to Literature.
- Colin Macdonald Gilray, MC, Principal of the Scotch College, Melbourne.
- John Alexander James, ChM MB FRCS, a prominent surgeon and physician in the Australian Capital Territory.
- William Stanley Kelly, a prominent agriculturist. For public services.
- Henry Gilbert Nobbs, of Sydney. For outstanding services to the blind.
- The Reverend Frank Harrison Rayward, Superintendent of the Central Methodist Mission, Sydney.
- Christopher Sheehy, General Manager of the Commonwealth Dairy Produce Equalisation Committee Ltd.
- Alan Robert Stanley Vickers, ChM MB. For services to the Flying Doctor Service in Australia.

==== Members of the Order of the British Empire (MBE) ====
Military Division

Royal Australian Navy

- Lieutenant-Commander Albert James Haberfield, (Retired).
- Lieutenant-Commander Harold Blomfield Hatten, (Retired).
- Lieutenant (E) John Alfred Hutton, (Retired).
- Lieutenant-Commander (S) Frederick Walter Nelson, (Emergency List).

Army

- Major John Cletus Holden, Australian Military Forces.
- Captain Colin Campbell Knott, Commonwealth Military Forces.
- Captain Leo Max Riedel, Australian Military Forces.
- Lieutenant Albert William Smith, Commonwealth Military Forces.

Royal Australian Air Force

- Squadron Leader John Wallworth Nankivell (03591).
- Squadron Leader Frank Stiller (03400).
- Flight Lieutenant Arthur Machin (03122).
- Warrant Officer Ole Norman Eric Johannesen (A.3670).

Civil Division

- Harold Bruce Bennett. For services to munitions production in Tasmania.
- Hugh Lancelot Brisbane. For services to munitions production in Western Australia.
- Ethel Braun. For social welfare services, especially in hospitals.
- Gladys De-aar Elliott, formerly Matron-in-Charge, Australian Comforts Fund, Hobart, Tasmania.
- Colonel Daniel Edward Evans, DSO VD. For services to munitions production in Queensland.
- James Sydney Wallace Eve, of Sydney, For services to amateur Sport.
- Ruth Heathcock. For outstanding services to the community in one of the remotest areas of Australia.
- Henry Christian Hopman, of Melbourne. For services to Sport.
- Lieutenant-Commissioner Joshua James, Territorial Commander of the Salvation Army in the Commonwealth of Australia.
- Stephen Lackey Kessell, formerly Controller of Timber.
- Roy Waugh Kippax, of Sydney. For services to the blind.
- Eileen Gertrude Lenihan, Private Secretary to the Prime Minister for many years.
- Walter Albert Lindrum, a well-known Australian billiards player. For services to charitable organisations.
- Iney Louisa Marden. For voluntary services to Service personnel organisations.
- Frank Tennyson Perry. For services to munitions production in South Australia.
- Sydney Ernest Pratt. For services to Australian journalism.
- Alice Marion Prichard, RRC, Matron of Saint George's Hospital, Kogarah.
- Stephen Harold Stack. For services to the War Veterans' Home in New South Wales.
- Patricia Tillyard, President of the Canberra Community Hospital Auxiliary.
- John Stapledon Wilkinson. For services to ex-servicemen and the Red Cross.

=== British Empire Medals (BEM) ===
Military Division

Royal Australian Navy

- Master-at-Arms Stanley Williamson, No.16470.

Army

- No. 1/9594 Warrant Officer Class 2 (temporary) Albert Edwin Connolly, Australian Military Forces.
- No. 2/134806 Sergeant (temporary) Henry Hamilton James, Commonwealth Military Forces.
- No. 4/9322 Sergeant Robert Winfred Lyon, Australian Military Forces.

=== Air Force Crosses (AFC) ===
Royal Australian Air Force

- Wing Commander Keith Raymond John Parsons, DSO DFC (0337).
- Squadron Leader William David Ephgrave (03394).
- Squadron Leader Ronald Albert Hosking, DFC (033102).
- Flight Lieutenant John Ihwin Adams (033119).
- Flight Lieutenant James Patrick Graney (04409).
- Flight Lieutenant Geoffrey Hughes, DFC (021974).

=== Air Force Medals (AFM) ===
Royal Australian Air Force

- A.33201 Pilot 1 Geoffrey Thornton.

=== King's Commendations for Valuable Service in the Air ===
Royal Australian Air Force

- Flight Lieutenant John Iveson (022023).
- Flight Lieutenant William Henry Scott (033175).

== Ceylon ==
=== Knights Bachelor ===
- Chittampalam Abraham Gardiner, Senator.
- The Honourable Edward George Perera Jayetileke, KC, Chief Justice of Ceylon.

=== Order of Saint Michael and Saint George ===
==== Companions of the Order of St Michael and St George (CMG) ====
- Oswald Leslie De Kretser II. For public services. Lately Puisne Justice.
- Hethumuni Ayadoris De Silva, District Judge, Colombo.

=== Order of the British Empire ===
==== Commanders of the Order of the British Empire (CBE) ====
Military Division

- Brigadier the Right Honourable James Roderick, Earl of Caithness, DSO, Commander-in-Chief, Ceylon Army.

Civil Division

- Joseph Nalliah Arumugam, Permanent Secretary, Ministry of Transport and Works.
- Abdon Ignatius Perera, OBE, Postmaster General and Director of Telecommunications.

==== Officers of the Order of the British Empire (OBE) ====
Civil Division

- Suriyakumara Nichinga Senathiraja Ambalavaner Naganather Thandigai Canaganayagam, JP, Head Shroff, National Bank of India, Ltd., Kandy.
- Don Sam De Simon, LMS LRCP&S LRFP&S, Medical Superintendent, Hendala Leprosy Hospital.
- David Shillingford Paynter. For public and social services.
- Conrad Boniface Peter Perera, Acting Settlement Officer, Land Settlement Department.
- Don William Rajapatirana, Commissioner of Income Tax, Estate Duty and Stamps.
- Sinnatamby Subramaniam, LMS LRCP&S LRFP&S. For medical and social services.

==== Members of the Order of the British Empire (MBE) ====
Military Division

- Major Terence Richard Jansen, ED LMS LRCP&S LRFP&S, Ceylon Medical Corps.

Civil Division

- Dinshah Pherojshah Bilimoria. For public services.
- Somadeva Casinathan, lately Rubber Commissioner and Rubber Controller.
- Mandawalagama Appuhamelage Gunasekera. For public and social services.
- Mohamed Ismail, Serjeant-at-Arms, House of Representatives.
- Thanahandi David Mendis. For services to transport.
- Ahamado Casim Mohammado, JP, Proctor and Notary, Colombo.
- Swaminathar Patanjali. For public services in Jaffna.
- Aruwala Jotige Simon Perera. For public and charitable services.
- Victor Garvin Weerawardena Ratnayake, Member of Parliament for Deniyaya.
- Abdul Rahaman Mohamed Thassim. For public services in Galle.
- Joseph Nicholas Cecil Tiruchelvam, JP, City Coroner.
- Oliver Weerasinghe, FRIBA, Government Town Planner.

== Pakistan ==
=== Order of the Bath ===
==== Knights Commander of the Order of the Bath (KCB) ====
Military Division

- General (temporary) Sir Douglas David Gracey, KCIE CB CBE MC, Special List (ex-Indian Army).

=== Order of the British Empire ===
==== Commanders of the Order of the British Empire (CBE) ====
Military Division

- Acting Rear-Admiral James Wilfrid Jefford, OBE, Royal Navy (Special List) (ex-Royal Indian Navy).
- Acting Air Commodore Robert George Bowditch, Royal Air Force.

==== Officers of the Order of the British Empire (OBE) ====
Military Division

- Acting Captain George Bailey, DSC, Royal Navy (Special List) (ex-Royal Indian Navy).
- Brigadier (temporary) Francis Herman Barclay Ingall, DSO, Special List (ex-Indian Army).
- Colonel (temporary) Geoffrey Knowles, Special List (ex-Indian Army).
- Acting Squadron Leader John Edwin Loxton, (53285), Royal Air Force,

==== Members of the Order of the British Empire (MBE) ====
Military Division

- Major (War Substantive) John Darby, Special List (ex-Indian Army).
