= List of defunct intelligence agencies =

Defunct intelligence agencies include the following: The list of this article is not exhaustive.

== Agencies by country ==
=== Afghanistan ===
- Istikhbarat (–1978)
- Da Afghanistan da Gato da Saatane Adara (AGSA) (1978–1979)
- KhAD-e-Nezami (Military Intelligence) (1978-1992)
- Komite-ye Amniyat-e Melli (KAM) (1979)
- Khedamat-e Etelea'at-e Dawlati (KhAD) (1980–1987)
- Wazarat-e Amaniat-e Dowlati (WAD) (1986–1992)
- National Directorate of Security (NDS) (2002–2021)

=== Albania ===
- Drejtorija e Sigurimit të Shtetit (Sigurimi) (Directorate of State Security) (1944–1991)

=== Algeria ===
- Department of Intelligence and Security (DRS) (1962–2016)

=== Argentina ===
- Batallón de Inteligencia 601 (601 Intelligence Battalion) (late 1970s–2000)
- Central Nacional de Inteligencia (CNI) (National Intelligence Center) (–2001)
- Coordinación de Informaciones de Estado (CIDE) (State Information Coordination) (1946–1955)
- División de Informaciones (Information Division) (1946–1955)
- Secretaría de Informaciones de Estado (SIDE) (Secretariat of State Information) (1955–1956)

=== Austro-Hungarian Empire ===
- Evidenzbureau (1850–1918)

=== Azerbaijan ===
- Ministry of National Security (1991-2015)

=== Brazil ===
- Serviço Nacional de Informações (SNI) (National Information Service) (1964–1990)
- Departamento de Operações Internas-Centro de Operações de Defesa Interna (DOI-CODI) (Internal Operations Department-Centre for Internal Defence Operations) (1969–1984)
- Subsecretaria de Inteligência (SSI) (Sub-Secretariat of Intelligence) (1990–1995)

=== Bulgaria ===
- Durzhavna Sigurnost (DS) (1964–1989)

=== Canada ===
- RCMP Security Service (1950–1984)

=== Chile ===
- Dirección de Inteligencia Nacional (DINA) (National Directorate of Intelligence) (1973–1977)
- Central Nacional de Inteligencia (CNI) (National Intelligence Center)

=== China and Taiwan ===
- Embroidered Uniform Guard (1368–1645)
- Eastern Depot (1420–1644)
- Bureau of Investigation and Statistics (1927–1946)
- National Committee of Investigations and Statistics (1935–1949)
- Taiwan Garrison Command (1945–1992)

=== Colombia ===
- Departamento Administrativo de Seguridad (DAS) (Administrative Department of Security) (1960–2011) (Succeeded by National Intelligence Directorate DNI)

=== Confederate States of America ===
- Confederate Secret Service (1861–1865)

=== Czechoslovakia ===
- Federal Directorate of Intelligence Services (FSZS)
- Hlavni Sprava Rozvedky (HSR)
- Státní Bezpečnost (StB) (1945–1990)

=== Dutch East Indies ===
- Politieke Inlichtingendienst (PID) (1916–1945)

=== Ecuador ===
- National Intelligence Secretariat (SENAIN) (2009–2018)

=== Egypt ===
- State Security Investigations Service (SSIS) (1913–2011) (succeeded By National Security Agency - Egypt Since 2011)

=== Finland ===
- Ministry of Interior
  - Etsivä keskuspoliisi (EK, 1919–1938)
  - Valtiollinen poliisi (Valpo I, 1939–1944)
  - Red Valpo (Valpo II, 1944–1948)
- Finnish Defence Forces
  - Intelligence Research Establishment (VKoeL, 1960–2014) – Viestikoelaitos / Signalprovanstalten
- Ministry of Defence
  - Military Intelligence Service (PVTK, 2007–2014) – Pääesikunnan tiedusteluosasto

=== France ===
- Secret du Roi (King's Secret) (1746-1774)
- Deuxième Bureau (Second Bureau) (1871–1940)
- Renseignements Généraux (General Intelligence - RG) (1937–2008) (Merged mainly with DST into Central Directorate of Interior Intelligence)
- Bureau Central de Renseignements et d'Action (Central Bureau of Intelligence and Operations) (BCRA) (1940-1943), existed under different names along its existence. BCRA is the most known.
- Direction générale des Services spéciaux (General Directorate of Special Services) (DGSS) (1943-1944)
- Direction Générale des Études et Recherches (General Directorate for Studies and Research) (DGER) (1944-1945)
- Service de Documentation Extérieure et de Contre-Espionnage (External Documentation and Counter-Espionage Service) (SDECE) (1945–1982)
- Direction de la Surveillance du Territoire (Directorate of Territorial Surveillance) (DST) (1944–2008)
- Co-ordination unit of the fight against terrorism (Unité de coordination de la lutte anti-terroriste) (UCLAT) (1984-2020)
- Direction centrale du renseignement intérieur (Central Directorate of Interior Intelligence) (DCRI) (2008-2014) (Predecessor of General Directorate for Internal Security)
- Sous-direction de l'information générale (Sub-directorate of general information) (SDIG) (2008-2014) (One of the successor of General Intelligence)
- Service central du renseignement territorial (Central Territorial Intelligence Service) (SCRT) (2014-2023) (The successor is Direction nationale du renseignement territorial) (National Directorate of Territorial Intelligence)

=== Federal Republic of Germany (West Germany) ===
- Gehlen Organization ("The Org", "Zipper") (1946–1956)
- Office/Center for Intelligence of the Federal Armed Forces (ANBw/ZNBw) (1956-2007)

=== German Democratic Republic (East Germany) ===
- Ministerium für Staatssicherheit (MfS or Stasi) (Ministry for State Security) (1950–1990)
  - Main Directorate for Reconnaissance (HVA) (1955–1990)
- Military Intelligence of the National People's Army (Militärische Aufklärung der Nationalen Volksarmee) (1956–1990)

=== German Reich ===
- Abwehr (1920–1945)
- Abteilung Fremde Heere Ost (Department Foreign Armies East) (1938–1945)
- Geheime Staatspolizei (Gestapo) (Secret State Police) (1933–1945)
- Geheime Feldpolizei (GFP) (Secret Field Police) (1939–1945)
- Sicherheitsdienst (SD) (Security Service) (1931–1945)
- Reichssicherheitsdienst (RSD) (Reich Security Service) (1933–1945)
- B-Dienst (Observation Service) (1918–1945)
- Naval Intelligence Service, also called Nachrichten-Abteilung (1899–1919)
- Abteilung III b (Department III b) (1889–1918)
- Prussian Secret Police (1851–1933)

=== Haiti ===
- Service d'Intelligence National (SIN) (National Intelligence Service) (1986–1991)

=== Hong Kong ===
- Special Branch (1930–1995)

=== Hungary ===
- Államvedélmi Osztály (ÁVO) (State Protection Department) (1948–1956)
- Államvédelmi Hatóság (ÁVH) (State Protection Authority) (1945–1956)

=== Israel ===
- ha-Lishka le-Kishrei Mada (Lekem or Lakam) (Bureau of Scientific Relations) (1957–1986)

=== Italy ===
- Organizzazione per la Vigilanza e la Repressione dell'Antifascismo (OVRA) (1927–1945)
- Servizio Informazioni Militare (SIM) (1925–1949)
- Servizio Informazioni Segrete (SIS) (1931–1943)

=== Indonesia ===
- Komando Pemulihan Keamanan dan Ketertiban (Kopkamtib) (1965–1988)
- Badan Koordinasi Stabilitas Nasional (Bakorstanas) (1988–2000)

=== Iran ===
- Sazeman-i Ettelaat va Amniyat-i Keshvar (SAVAK) (National Organization for Intelligence and Security) (1957–1979)
- Rokn-e-Dovvom (Second Bureau) (1926–1979)

=== Iraq ===
- Al-Amn al-‘Amm (Directorate of General Security) (1922–2003)
- Al-Amn al-Khas (Special Security Organization) (1983–2003)
- Al-Istikhabarat al-'Askariyya (Directorate of General Military Intelligence) (1932–2003)
- Jihaz Al-Mukhabarat Al-A'ma (Iraqi Intelligence Service) (1973–2003)

=== Ireland ===
- Free State Army Intelligence Department ("Oriel House") (1921–1923)
- Criminal Investigation Department (CID) (1921–1923)
- Citizens' Defence Force (1922)

=== Japan ===
- Cabinet Intelligence and Research Office (CIRO) (1986-2026)
- Kempeitai (1881–1945)
- Tokkeitai
- Tokkō (1911–1945)

=== Libya ===
- Jamahiriya el-Mukhabarat (–2011)

=== Malaysia ===
- Malayan Security Service (1939–1948)

=== Manchukuo ===
- Hoankyoku (1937–1945)

=== Netherlands ===
- Binnenlandse Veiligheidsdienst (BVD) (Interior Security Service) (1947–2002)
- Inlichtingendienst Buitenland (IDB) (Foreign Intelligence Service) (1946–1994)
- Netherlands East Indies Forces Intelligence Service (NEFIS) (1942–1945)
- Netherlands Indies Government Information Service (NIGIS) (1942–1945)

=== Ottoman Empire ===
- Teşkîlât-ı Mahsûsa (1913–1918)

=== Panama ===
- Policia Secreta Nacional (PSN) (La Secreta) (1909–60s first government secret agency)
- Guardia Silenciosa Panameñista (GUSIPA) (1930–40s short-lived secret service)
- 1.Estado Mayor Personal/Sec."E" Asuntos de Seguridad Nacional of PFD General Command
- Sub Jefatura de Inspectoria General of PFD General State Major Chieftain
- Comando General de la Comision de Defensa y Seguridad (COGECODESE) (security, defense and intelligence PNG/PFD main entity)
- Estado Mayor General ('Inteligencia') (G-2) (1950–80s PNG/PDFs military intelligence)
- Departamento Nacional de Investigaciones (DENI) (1960–1989)

=== Philippines ===
- Philippine Constabulary – Office of Special Investigations (PC-OSI) (1901–1991)
- Philippine Constabulary – National Constabulary Investigations Service (PC-NCIS) (1901–1936)
- National Intelligence and Security Authority (NISA) (1972–1987)
- Civil Intelligence and Security Agency (CISA) (1972–1987)

=== Poland ===
- Oddział II Sztabu Generalnego Wojska Polskiego (1918–1939)
  - Biuro Szyfrów (Cypher Bureau) (1919–1945)
  - Estezet (STZ) (1941–1945)
  - Polish Agency of Trade Information (PAIH) (1932–1939)
- Ministerstwo Bezpieczeństwa Publicznego (1945–1954)
- Komitet do spraw Bezpieczeństwa Publicznego (1954–1956)
- Ministerstwo Spraw Wewnętrznych (MSW) (1954–1990)
  - Departament I MSW
  - Departament II MSW
  - Służba Bezpieczeństwa MSW (SB-MSW) (1956–1990)
- Urząd Ochrony Państwa (UOP) (Office for State Protection) (1990–2001)
- Główny Zarząd Informacji Wojska Polskiego (1944–1957)
- Wojskowa Służba Wewnętrzna (WSW) (1957–1990)
- Oddział II Sztabu Generalnego LWP (1945–1951)
- Zarząd II Sztabu Generalnego Wojska Polskiego (1951–1990)

=== Portugal ===
- PIDE (1933–1969)

=== Qatar ===
- General Intelligence Service (Mukhabarat)
- Investigation and State Security Service (mubahith)

=== Federation of Rhodesia and Nyasaland ===
- Federal Intelligence and Security Bureau

=== Roman Empire ===
- Agentes in rebus (4th–7th century)
- Areani
- Bureau of Barbarians
- Frumentarii
- Praetorian Guard (27 BC–312 AD)

=== Romania ===
- Secția a-II-a (Section II) (1859–1908)
- Siguranța Statului (Siguranța) (State Security) (1908–1940)
- Serviciul Special de Informații (Special Intelligence Service) (1940–1944)
- Serviciul de Informații (Intelligence Service) (1944–1948)
- Departamentul Securității Statului (Securitate) (Department of State Security) (1948–1991)

=== Russia ===
==== Russian Empire (1721–1917) ====
- Third Section of His Imperial Majesty's Own Chancellery (1826–1880)
- Okhrannoye otdeleniye (Okhrana or slang Okhranka) (Security Section) (1866–1917)
- Special Corps of Gendarmes (1836–1917)

==== RSFSR (1917–1922) ====
- Cheka (1917–1922) (All-Russian Extraordinary Commission)

==== Russian Federation (1991–) ====
- Federal Counterintelligence Service (1993–1995)

=== Serbia ===
- Service for Research and Documentation (SID) (Ministry of Foreign Affairs) (1949–2007)

=== Sri Lanka ===
- Special Branch (1966–1970)

=== Singapore ===
- Criminal Intelligence Department (1918–1933)
- Special Branch (1933–1939)
- Singapore Special Branch (1948–1966)
- Internal Security Department (1966–1970)

=== Somalia ===
- National Security Service (NSS) (1970–1990)

=== South Africa ===
- Bureau of State Security (BOSS) (1969–1980)

=== Soviet Union ===
- Cheka (1917–1922) (All-Russian Extraordinary Commission)
- Gosudarstvennoye Politicheskoye Upravleniye (GPU) (1922–1923) (State Political Directorate)
- Obyedinennoye Gosudarstvennoye Politicheskoye Upravleniye (OGPU) (1923–1934) (Joint State Political Directorate)
- Narodnyi Kommissariat Vnutrennih Del (NKVD) (1934–1946) (People's Commissariat for Internal Affairs)
- Ministerstvo Vnutrennih Del (MVD) (1946–1954) (Ministry for Internal Affairs)
- Ministerstvo Gosudarstvennoi Bezopastnosti (MGB) (1943–1953) (Ministry for State Security)
- Komitet Gosudarstvennoi Bezopasnosti (KGB) (1954–1991) (Committee for State Security)
- Central Intelligence Service of USSR (1991)

=== Spain ===
- Centro Superior de Información de la Defensa (CESID) (Main Defence Information Centre) (1977–2002)
- Political-Social Brigade (BPS/BSI) (1941–1978)
- Servicio de Información Militar (SIM/MIS) (1937-1939)

=== Sweden ===
- IB ("Informationsbyrån") (1973)

=== Syria ===
National Security Bureau (1966-2024)

- General Intelligence Directorate (1971-2024)
- Political Security Directorate (1971-2024)
- Military Intelligence Directorate (1969-2024)
- Air Force Intelligence Directorate (1970-2024)

=== Turkey ===
- Millî Emniyet Hizmeti Riyâseti (M.E.H./MAH, between 1926 and 1965)

=== Uganda ===
- State Research Bureau

=== Ukraine ===
- Kontrrazvedka (1919–1921)

=== United Kingdom ===
- MI1 (1915–1919)
- MI2 (–1941)
- MI3 (1914–1945)
- MI4 (1915–1991)
- MI7 (1915–1940)
- MI8 (1914–1945)
- MI9 (1939–1945)
- MI10 (1940–1961)
- MI11 (–1945)
- MI12
- MI14 (–1943)
- MI15 (1942–)
- MI16 (1945–)
- MI17
- MI19 (1940–)
- Naval Intelligence Division (NID) (1912–1964)
- Special Operations Executive (SOE) (1940–1946)
- Gangmasters and Labour Abuse Authority (2005–2026)

=== United States ===
- Air Force Intelligence, Surveillance and Reconnaissance Agency (1948–2014)
- Office of Strategic Services (OSS) (1942–1945)
- The Pond (1942–1955)
- National Drug Intelligence Center (1993–2012)

=== North Vietnam ===
- Central Research Agency

=== South Vietnam ===
- Central Intelligence Office (1961–1975)
- Military Security Directorate
- Strategic Technical Directorate
- Research and Documentation Office
- Intelligence Directorate

=== Vietnam ===
  - Tổng cục An ninh (Tổng cục I) (General Department of Security or First General Department)
  - Tổng cục Tình báo Công an (Tổng cục V, or TC V) (General Department of Public Security Intelligence or Fifth General Department)

=== Yugoslavia ===
- UDBA (1946–1991)
- KOS (Kontraobaveštajna služba), Counterintelligence Service (General staff) (1946–1992)

== See also ==
- List of law enforcement agencies
- Secret service
- Secret police
- List of intelligence agencies
