= SSI =

SSI may refer to:

== Companies ==
- Safe Superintelligence Inc., an American artificial intelligence company
- Sahaviriya Steel Industries, Thai steel company
- Samsung Semiconductor Inc., a Korean electronics company
- Silicon Systems Inc., an American company that produced integrated circuits
- Sonangol Sinopec International, a Chinese-Angolan oil company
- Space Services Inc., a team of companies investigating new commercial opportunities in space
- Strategic Simulations Inc, computer gaming company that produced war and simulation games from the mid-1980s to late 1990s.
- Survey Sampling International, a global provider of sampling solutions in marketing research program
- SSI Group, a healthcare revenue cycle company; see Rosa Lavín

== Science and technology ==
- Soil-structure interaction, the interaction between soil and structures (e.g. buildings), especially in seismic engineering
- Solid State Interlocking, the brand name of a railway signalling system developed in the 1980s in the UK
- Solid state ionics, the study of ionic-electronic and ionic conductors (solid electrolytes) and their uses
- SteadyShot Inside, a sensor-based camera image stabilization system by Sony

=== Computing ===
- Serializable snapshot isolation, a way to allow multiple concurrent transactions to see consistent information when making changes to a database
- Server Side Includes, a server-side scripting language used on the Web
- Self-sovereign identity, the user has a means of generating and controlling unique identifiers as well as some facility to store identity data.
- Shared Source Initiative, a source-available software licensing scheme by Microsoft
- Simple Sensor Interface protocol, a simple communications protocol designed for smart sensors
- Single sign-in, a specialized form of software authentication
- Single system image, a cluster dedicated operating system
- Small-scale integration, a type of integrated circuit
- Synchronous Serial Interface, a serial interface standard for industrial applications

=== Medicine ===
- Stress–strain index, a measure of bone strength
- Surgical site infection
- Sliding scale insulin, fast- or rapid-acting insulin only given subcutaneously

== Economics and government ==
- Standing settlement instructions, payment processing and settlement information about financial institutions
- Strategic sustainable investing, an investment strategy that recognizes financial value in transitional leadership towards sustainability
- Supplemental Security Income, a United States federal government program
- Scottish statutory instrument, a form of secondary or subordinate legislation in Scotland
- Sensitive security information, a category of sensitive information under the US government's information sharing and control rules

== Military and police ==
- Selective Service Initiative, a form of military conscription in the United States
- Senior station inspector, a rank in the Singapore Police Force
- Shoulder sleeve insignia, formation insignia used by the United States Army
- Soldier Support Institute, a U.S. Army organization
- Staff Sergeant Instructor, an appointment in the British Army
- State Security Investigations Service, former Egyptian agency
- Strategic Studies Institute, the US Army War College institute for geostrategic and national security research and analysis
- Attack Submarine (Diesel Air-Independent Propulsion) (hull classification symbol: SSI), a submarine classification type used by the US Navy
- Subsecretaria de Inteligência, the Brazilian intelligence agency until 1995

== Organizations ==
- Sano Sansar Initiative, a global youth organization
- Scuba Schools International, a diver training organization
- Society of Scribes & Illuminators, an organisation dedicated to the promotion and development of the arts of calligraphy and illumination
- Software Sustainability Institute, a UK-based, academic software organisation
- Space Science Institute, an American nonprofit organisation based in Boulder, Colorado
- Space Studies Institute, an American non-profit organization based in Mojave, California
- Spastics Society of India, former name of Able Disable All People Together
- Spatial Sciences Institute, a professional body in the Asia-Pacific region
- Statens Serum Institut, the Danish State Serum Institute
- SSi Canada, a Canadian telecommunications and broadband company
- Swedish Radiation Safety Authority (Statens strålskyddsinstitut), a Stockholm-based regulatory and research government agency
- Students Supporting Israel, a network of pro-Israel student organizations in North America and the United Kingdom
- Swedish Society for Interlingua, a society that encourages the active use of Interlingua in Sweden

== Other uses ==
- Socio-scientific issues, controversial social issues which relate to science
- Solid State Ionics, a peer-reviewed scientific journal
- Solid State Intelligence, a malevolent entity described by John C. Lilly
- South Sandwich Islands, a chain of uninhabited volcanic islands in the South Atlantic Ocean, that is part of the South Georgia and the South Sandwich Islands British Overseas Territory
- St. Simons Island, a barrier island on the coast of Georgia, US
- Star of the Solomon Islands, the most senior award made by the government of the Solomon Islands
- Sustainable Society Index, a tool for assessing the sustainability of 151 assessed countries
