= Valentine Boucher =

British Army officer

Major-General Valentine Boucher CB CBE
- Born: 14 February 1904
- Died: 1 April 1961 (aged 57)
- Allegiance: United Kingdom
- Branch: British Army
- Rank: Major-General
- Service number: 30664
- Commands: 9th Battalion, Buffs (Royal East Kent Regiment)
- Conflicts: Second World War
- Awards: Companion of the Order of the Bath; Commander of the Order of the British Empire

Major-General Valentine Boucher CB CBE (14 February 1904 – 1 April 1961) was a British Army officer who served as Director of Military Intelligence.

== Military career ==
Boucher was commissioned into The Buffs (Royal East Kent Regiment). He served in the Second World War as commanding officer of the 9th Battalion The Buffs from May 1942 and Director of Movements at General Headquarters, India from January 1944, three months after his promotion to brigadier.

After the War, he became Director of Personnel Movement at the War Office in 1946, Deputy Director of Military Intelligence at the War Office in 1948 and Commander of 24th Infantry Brigade in 1950. He went on to be Director of Military Intelligence in July 1953 in which role he sought to ban the publication of The London Cage, a book by Alexander Scotland, which included allegations of torture by British soldiers and which a War Office Security official at MI11 decided "would not show the War Office on a good light". His last appointment was as Commander of the British Army Staff at the British Joint Services Mission in Washington, D.C. in June 1956 before retiring in January 1958.

He also served as colonel of the Buffs from 4 June 1953. He was appointed a Commander of the Order of the British Empire on the 1946 New Year Honours and a Companion of the Order of the Bath in the 1954 Birthday Honours.

== Sources ==
- Moran, Christopher (2013). Intelligence Studies in Britain and the US: Historiography Since 1945. Edinburgh University Press. ISBN 978-0748646272.

Military offices
Preceded by Arthur Shortt	Director of Military Intelligence; 1953–1956	Succeeded by Cedric Rhys Price
