= General Nugent =

General Nugent may refer to:

- George Colborne Nugent (1864–1915), British Army brigadier general
- Oliver Nugent (1860–1926), British Army major general
- Richard E. Nugent (1902–1979), U.S. Air Force lieutenant general
- Sir George Nugent, 1st Baronet (1757–1849), British Army general
