= MI-10 =

MI-10 can refer to:

- Mil Mi-10, Soviet helicopter
- Michigan's 10th congressional district
- M-10 (Michigan highway)
- MI10, British Military Intelligence, section 10
