= MI15 (disambiguation) =

MI-15, MI15, MI 15 or variant may refer to:

- MI15, British Military Intelligence Section 15
- Michigan's 15th congressional district
- M-15 (Michigan highway)
