= 140th (4th London) Brigade =

4th London Brigade 140th (4th London) Brigade 140th (4th London) Infantry Brigade 140th (London) Infantry Brigade
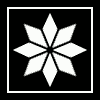
- Badge of 140th (4th London) Bridge
- Active: 1908–1919; 1920–1936; 1939–1944; 1944–1945
- Country: United Kingdom
- Branch: British Army
- Type: Infantry
- Size: Brigade
- Part of: 47th (1/2nd London) Division
- Nickname: "The Grey Brigade"
- Engagements: First World War

Commanders
- Notable commanders: Viscount Hampden; Arnold Cazenove

The 140th (4th London) Brigade was an infantry brigade formation of the British Army's Territorial Army (TA) that had its origins in a South London Brigade (known as the 'Grey Brigade') of the former Volunteer Force. It served on the Western Front in the First World War and was recreated during the Second World War where it served only in the United Kingdom as a training formation.

== Origin: 'The Grey Brigade' ==
An invasion scare in 1859 led to the creation of the Volunteer Force and huge enthusiasm for joining local Rifle Volunteer Corps (RVCs). There were a large number of these units in and around London, and the opportunity was taken to group them together for Easter training under the temporary command of officers of the Brigade of Guards stationed in the capital. Initially they were brigaded by the colour of their uniforms – scarlet, Rifle green or grey, the latter being a popular colour for RVCs in the 1860s. The Stanhope Memorandum of December 1888 proposed a formal Mobilisation Scheme for Volunteer units throughout the country, which would assemble by brigades at key points in case of war. In peacetime these brigades provided a structure for collective training. Under this scheme the units from Westminster, the West End of London and the adjacent suburbs (all in the County of Middlesex) were formed into the South London Brigade. These units had mainly been in the 'Grey Brigade', and the name stuck to the new formation. The staff for the brigade were provided by the Regimental Headquarters of the Scots Guards at Buckingham Gate in London, and its designated place of assembly was at the Guards' Depot at Caterham, where it could take its place in the London Defence Positions. Its composition was as follows:

- HQ: Scots Guards' Orderly Room
- Commanding Brigade: The Officer Commanding, Scots Guards
- Brigade-Major: The Regimental Adjutant, Scots Guards
- 2nd (South Middlesex) Middlesex RVC
- 4th (West London) Middlesex RVC
- 5th (West Middlesex) Middlesex RVC
- 7th (London Scottish) Middlesex RVC
- 9th (West Middlesex) Middlesex RVC (attached to 5th)
- 12th (Civil Service) Middlesex RVC
- 13th (Queen's) Middlesex RVC (Westminster)
- 14th (Inns of Court) Middlesex RVC
- 20th (Artists) Middlesex RVC
- 25th (Bank of England) Middlesex RVC (attached to 12th)
- 26th Middlesex RVC (attached to 14th)
- Supply detachment (later termed an Army Service Corps (ASC) Company)
- Bearer Company, Medical Staff Corps

The Volunteer Infantry Brigades were reorganised and increased in number in 1906, and by 1907 the South London Brigade had been numbered the 2nd London Brigade and the number of units reduced to six.

== Territorial Force ==
When the Territorial Force was created in 1908 under the Haldane Reforms, the existing volunteer units in the London area were brought together into a new London Regiment and organised into two divisions with a full complement of infantry brigades and supporting arms. The former South London Brigade now became the 4th London Brigade in 2nd London Division, still informally known as The Grey Brigade, still commanded by the CO of the Scots Guards, and with the following composition:

- 13th (County of London) Battalion, The London Regiment (Princess Louise's Kensington Regiment), headquartered in Kensington (the former 2nd and 4th Middlesex RVCs)
- 14th (County of London) Battalion, The London Regiment (London Scottish), headquartered at 59 Buckingham Gate (the former 7th Middlesex RVC).
- 15th (County of London) Battalion, The London Regiment (Prince of Wales's Own Civil Service Rifles) headquartered at Somerset House (the former 12th Middlesex RVC).
- 16th (County of London) Battalion, The London Regiment (Queen's Westminster Rifles), headquartered at 58 Buckingham Gate (the former 13th Middlesex RVC).
- No 2 (4th London Brigade) Company, 2nd London Divisional Train, ASC, headquartered at the Duke of York's Headquarters, Chelsea

== First World War ==
The outbreak of war on 4 August saw 4th London Brigade at Perham Down on Salisbury Plain, where it had just arrived for its annual training camp with the rest of 2nd London Division. They were immediately recalled to London to complete their mobilisation and by mid-August 4 London Bde had reached its war station round St Albans, Hertfordshire. The County of London Territorial Force Association immediately began raising '2nd Line' battalions, which quickly led to the formation of a duplicate 2/4th London Brigade (eventually 179th Brigade); consequently 4th London Brigade became 1/4th and its battalions similarly renumbered (1/13th–1/16th).

=== Order of Battle ===
Several of the London battalions were politically well-connected and were selected for overseas service ahead of the bulk of the Territorial Force. Thus the London Scottish, Queen's Westminsters and Kensingtons went to the Western Front as individual battalions attached to the British Expeditionary Force, the London Scottish being the first TF infantry battalion to see action, at Messines on 31 October 1914. These battalions were replaced by others from 2nd London Bde of 1st London Division, which had been temporarily broken up.

The following units served in 140 Bde:

- 1/6th (City of London) Battalion, The London Regiment (City of London Rifles) joined 5 November 1914; sent drafts to 1/15th and 1/17th Londons on 30 January, and cadre left to merge with 2/6th Londons in 58th (2/1st London) Division on 2 February 1918.
- 1/7th (City of London) Battalion, The London Regiment joined 5 November 1914; sent a draft to 1/19th Londons in 141st (5th London) Brigade on 29 January, and cadre left to merge with 2/7th Londons in 58th Division on 2 February 1918.
- 1/8th (City of London) Battalion, The London Regiment (Post Office Rifles) joined 6 November 1914; sent a draft to 1/17th Londons and cadre left to merge with 2/8th Londons in 58th Division on 2 February 1918.
- 1/15th (County of London) Battalion, The London Regiment (Civil Service Rifles)
- 140th Light Trench Mortar Battery formed June 1915.
- 2nd London Company ASC became 456th (Horse Transport) Company ASC August 1915.
- 1/4th (City of London) Bn London Regiment (Royal Fusiliers) joined 15 November 1915; transferred to 168th (2nd London) Brigade in 56th (1st London) Division on 9 February 1916.
- 1/17th (County of London) Battalion, The London Regiment (Poplar and Stepney Rifles) joined from 141st (5th London) Bde 1 February 1918.
- 1/21st (County of London) Battalion, The London Regiment (1st Surrey Rifles) joined from 142nd (6th London) Brigade 1 February 1918.
- 140th Machine Gun Company formed December 1915; merged into 47th Battalion Machine Gun Corps March 1918.

The 1/15th Londons (Civil Service Rifles) was the only prewar battalion of the brigade to serve with it throughout the war.

=== Service ===
In October 1914, 2nd London Division was selected for service on the Western Front and progressive training was carried out through the winter. The division embarked for France in March 1915, concentrating round Béthune. In May the division (already known in France simply as 'The London Division' to distinguish it from the Regular Army 2nd Division) took its place in the line and was designated 47th (1/2nd London) Division, with the brigades numbered consecutively: 4th London became 140th (1/4th London) Brigade.

=== Actions ===
During the war, the brigade was engaged in the following operations:

1915

- Battle of Aubers Ridge 9 May
- Battle of Festubert 15–25 May
- Battle of Loos 25 September–1 October
- Battle of the Hohenzollern Redoubt 13–19 October

1916

- Vimy Ridge 21 May
- Battle of the Somme:
  - Battle of Flers-Courcelette 15–19 September
  - Capture of High Wood 15 September
  - Battle of the Transloy Ridges 1–9 October
  - Capture of Eaucourt l'Abbaye 1–3 October
  - Attacks on the Butte de Warlencourt 7–8 October

1917

- Battle of Messines 7–13 June
- 3rd Battle of Ypres:
  - Battle of Pilckem Ridge] (in reserve) 31 July–2 August)
  - In the line 18 August–2 September and 8–17 September
- Battle of Cambrai:
  - Capture of Bourlon Wood 28 November
  - German counter-attacks 30 November–3 December

Early in 1918 the brigade was completely reorganised (see Order of Battle above)

1918

- 1st Battles of the Somme:
  - Battle of St Quentin 21–23 March
  - 1st Battle of Bapaume 24–25 March
  - Battle of the Ancre 5 April
- 2nd Battles of the Somme:
  - Battle of Albert 22–23 August
  - 2nd Battle of Bapaume 31 August–3 September
- Final Advance in Artois:
  - Operations in Artois 2 October–11 November
  - Official Entry into Lille 28 October

After the Armistice, 47th Division was engaged in railway repair and then settled down around Bethune to await demobilisation. This began in January, and the last troops left France on 10 May 1919. The brigade was demobilised at Felixstowe in May–June 1919.

== Interwar years ==
The 47th Division and its formations began to reform in the redesignated Territorial Army in 1920. 140 Bde was reformed with brigade HQ at the Regimental Headquarters of the Irish Guards at Wellington Barracks in Birdcage Walk. Initially the brigade was composed of its original prewar battalions, but in 1921 the Civil Service Rifles merged with the Queen's Westminsters, and the brigade was brought up to strength by the addition of the Artists' Rifles:

- 13th London Regiment (Princess Louise's Kensington Regiment).
- 14th London Regiment (London Scottish).
- 16th London Regiment (Queen's Westminster and Civil Service Rifles), headquartered at 58 Buckingham Gate.
- 28th London Regiment (Artists Rifles) headquartered at Duke's Road, Euston.

In 1935, a growing number of TA infantry battalions had been converted to the searchlight or anti-aircraft artillery role, and at the end of the year 47th Division was disbanded and converted into 1st Anti-Aircraft Division. 140 Brigade HQ was also disbanded and its battalions dispersed to other London infantry brigades. the 13th and 14th London Regiment both transferred to 2nd London Infantry Brigade, the London Division, previously 56th Division but with the disbandment of 47th Division it was redesignated the London Division.

However, the rapid expansion of the TA after the Munich Crisis saw a new 4th London Infantry Brigade reformed with 2nd Line TA battalions, to provide a duplicate of 1st London Infantry Brigade. 4th London Brigade resumed its number as 140 (London) Brigade on 21 November 1940.

== Second World War ==
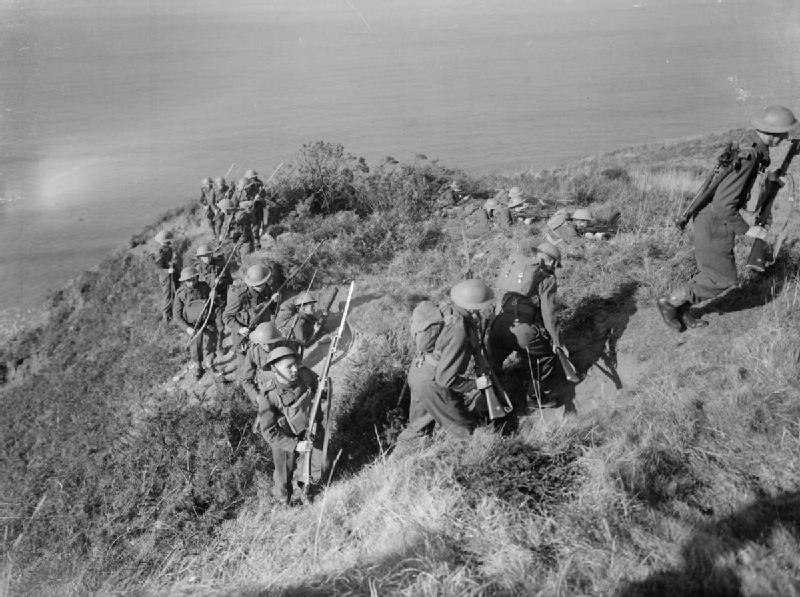
Men of the 2nd Battalion, London Irish Rifles advancing with fixed bayonets after climbing up the cliffs during training at Little Haven near Haverfordwest.

The composition of 140 (London) Brigade during the war was as follows:

- 11th Battalion, Royal Fusiliers
- 12th Battalion, Royal Fusiliers (to 211th Brigade 16 September 1943).
- 2nd Battalion, London Irish Rifles (Royal Ulster Rifles) (to 210th Independent Infantry Brigade (Home) 30 November 1941).
- 4th London Infantry Brigade Anti-Tank Company (formed July 1940; became 140 (London) Infantry Brigade Anti-Tank Company; disbanded 28 November 1941).
- 6th Battalion, Oxfordshire and Buckinghamshire Light Infantry (from 214th Independent Infantry Brigade (Home) 1 December 1941; to India 10 March 1942).
- 6th Battalion, Royal Irish Fusiliers (joined 10 March 1942; to 141st (London) Brigade 2 October 1942)
- 17th Battalion, Royal Fusiliers (from 141st (London) Brigade 2 October 1942; to 144th Brigade 10 December 1942)
- 2nd Battalion, Gloucestershire Regiment (from 145th Brigade 10 December 1942; to 56th Brigade 29 February 1944).
- 2/4th Battalion, Essex Regiment (from 206th Independent Infantry Brigade 12 April 1943; to 7th Brigade 10 August 1944).
- 11th Battalion, West Yorkshire Regiment (from Falkland Islands 17 March 1943; to 143rd Brigade 10 August 1944).

The 140th Infantry Brigade did not see any active service in the Second World War. It mobilised as a motor brigade, but became a conventional infantry brigade in June 1940. It was disbanded on 31 August 1944. On 17 November 1944, 213th Brigade (which had recently joined 47th Division, now reformed as a reserve division) was renumbered 140th Infantry Brigade, but without any London connection. The new brigade had the following composition:

- 4th Battalion, Oxfordshire and Buckinghamshire Light Infantry
- 6th Battalion, Royal Sussex Regiment
- 7th Battalion, Gloucestershire Regiment

The brigade was not included in the Territorial Army when it reformed in 1947.

== Commanders ==
140 Brigade was commanded by the following officers:

- Brig.-Gen. F.J. Heyworth (from 9 October 1913)
- Brig.-Gen. G.J. Cuthbert (from 26 November 1914)
- Brig.-Gen. W. Thwaites (from 2 June 1915)
- Brig.-Gen. Viscount Hampden (from 11 July 1916; went sick 6 May 1917)
- Brig.-Gen. H.B.P.L. Kennedy (from 18 May 1917)
- Col. L.M. Gregson, Irish Guards, (1932)
- Brig. W.P.A. Bradshaw (on outbreak of war)
- Brig. J.W. Pendlebury (from 3 November 1941)
- Brig. A. de L. Cazenove (from 12 April 1943 to disbandment of original brigade)
- Brig. E.H.L. White (from 213th Bde)
- Brig M.A. James (from 24 July 1945)

== External sources ==
- The Long, Long Trail
- The Regimental Warpath 1914–1918
- British Army 1914
- Land Forces of Britain, the Empire and Commonwealth
- Patriot Files
- British Military History
