= MI-17 (disambiguation) =

Mil Mi-17 is a Soviet-designed Russian military helicopter family.

MI-17 may also refer to:

- Michigan's 17th congressional district
- M-17 (Michigan highway)

== See also ==
- MI17
