= MI-11 =

MI-11 or variant may represent:

- Michigan's 11th congressional district
- M-11 (Michigan highway)
- MI11, British Military Intelligence section 11
- Xiaomi Mi 11, an Android smartphone
