= Prince of Wales' Own Civil Service Rifles =

Infantry regiment of the British Army

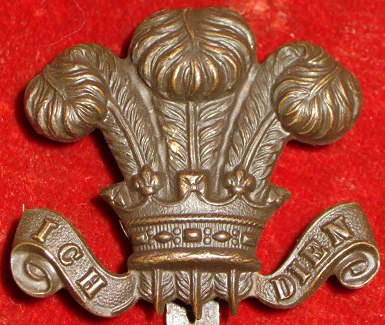
- Cap badge of the Prince of Wales' Own Civil Service Rifles
- Active: 1860–1921
- Country: United Kingdom
- Branch: Volunteer Force; British Army
- Type: Rifle regiment
- Part of: London Regiment
- Garrison/HQ: Somerset House
- Motto: Ich dien (I Serve)
- Engagements: Boer War; World War I

The Prince of Wales' Own Civil Service Rifles was an infantry regiment of the Volunteer Force and Territorial Force of the British Army from 1860 to 1921; it saw active service in the Boer War and World War I as part of the London Regiment.

== History ==
=== Early history ===
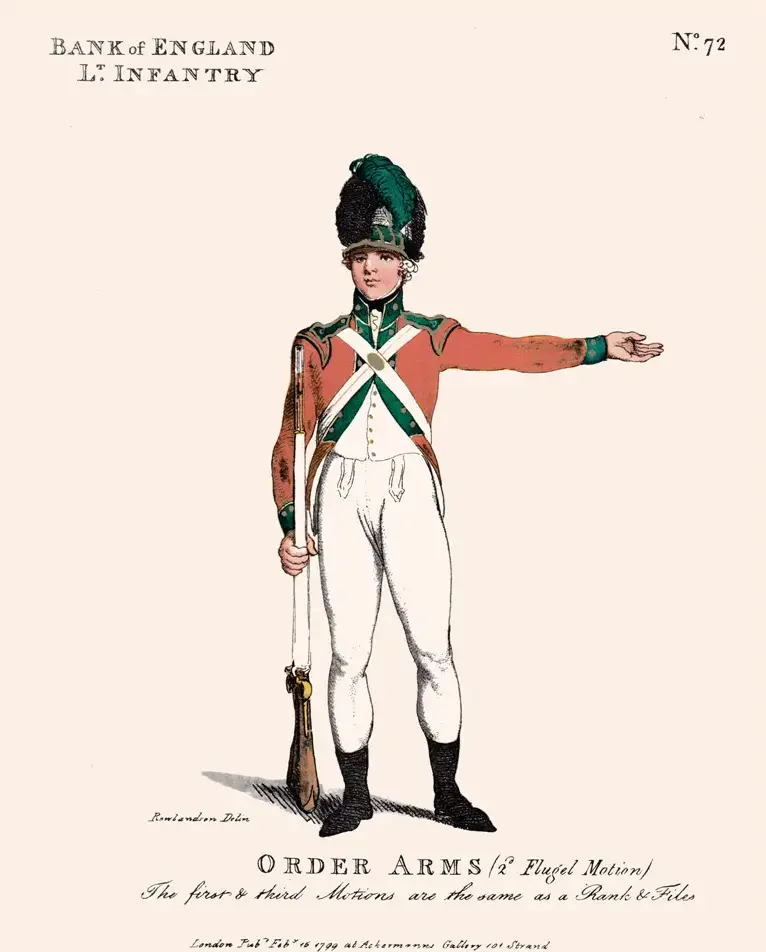
1798 engraving of a light infantry private of the Bank of England Volunteers

The regiment was originally raised in 1798 as the Bank of England Volunteers, an infantry regiment of the British Volunteer Corps. Re-raised in 1803 the regiment was permanently disbanded in 1814 following the signing of the Treaty of Paris. The regiment was re-raised by Viscount Bury on the formation of the Volunteer Force in 1860 as the 21st Middlesex Middlesex Rifle Volunteers (Civil Service Rifles). By 1880 and the re-numbering of London Rifle Volunteers the unit was titled 12th Middlesex (Civil Service) Rifle Volunteer Corps and were linked as a Volunteer Battalion of the King's Royal Rifle Corps.

On formation of the Territorial Force in 1908 the Civil Service Rifles became part of the newly formed London Regiment and was titled 15th Battalion London Regiment (Civil Service Rifles).

=== First World War ===
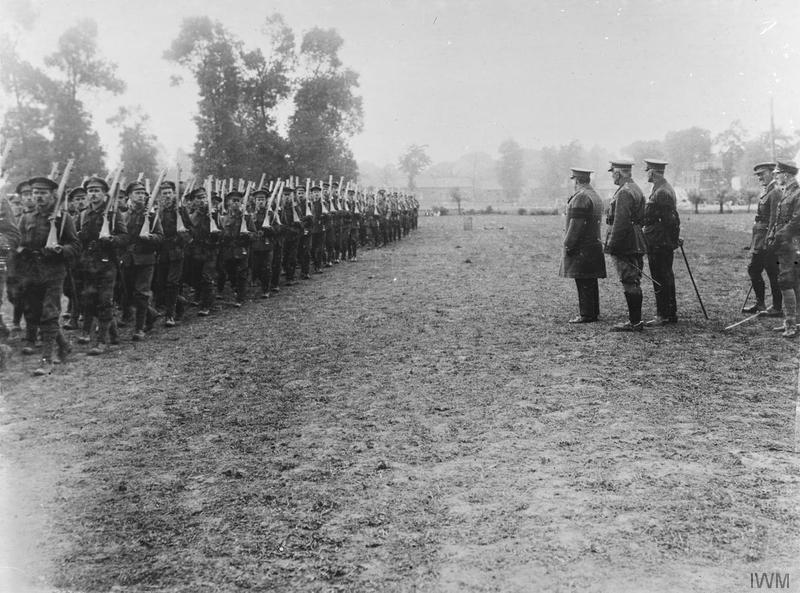
Men of the 15th Battalion, London Regiment (Civil Service Rifles), 47th Division, marching past the lord mayor of London, Colonel Sir Charles Wakefield, 11 June 1916.

At the start of the First World War the battalion established its headquarters at Somerset House; the commanding officer, Lt Col RG Hayes, refused to serve overseas, an example followed by most of the men of his battalion. During the war the regiment eventually expanded to two battalions, with the 1st Battalion arriving in France in March 1915 forming part of the 4th London Brigade, part of the 2nd London Division.

=== Inter-war ===
Following the war the Civil Service Rifles were amalgamated with the 16th (County of London) Battalion, London Regiment in 1921.

== Battle honours ==
The regiment's battle honours were as follows:

- South Africa 1900–02
- The Great War (3 battalions):
- Festubert 1915, Loos, Somme 1916, 1918, Flers-Courcelette, Le Transloy, Messines 1917, Ypres 1917, Cambrai 1917, St. Quentin, Ancre 1918, Albert 1918, Bapaume 1918, Pursuit to Mons, France and Flanders 1915–18, Doiran 1917, Macedonia 1916–17, Gaza, Nebi Samwil, Jerusalem, Palestine 1917–18

== Regimental motto ==
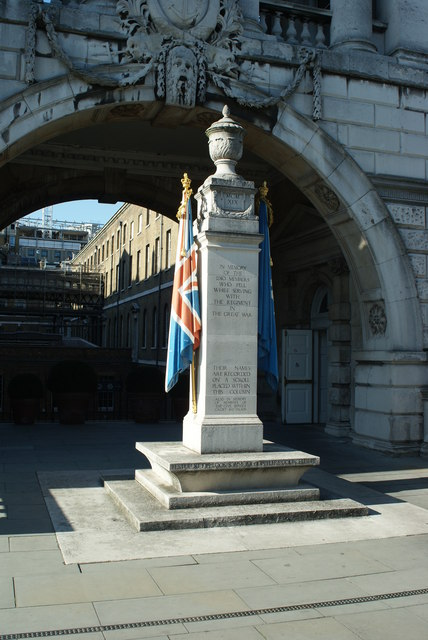
The Memorial of the 15th London, Somerset House, London

"Ich Dien" (German for "I serve", a contraction of ich diene), the motto of the Prince of Wales.

== Uniform ==
From 1863 until 1888 the regiment wore a dark grey uniform with royal blue facings and a shako. In that year the home service helmet of the regular infantry was adopted as headdress. At a time when colourful uniforms were still the norm the sombre colour of this uniform was considered unattractive and blamed for a fall off in recruiting. Accordingly light grey was adopted in 1890, although royal blue was still retained for the facings in full dress uniform until 1914. Khaki drill was worn in South Africa and the standard khaki of the British Army in France during World War I.

== Regimental memorial ==
The memorial for the Prince of Wales' Own Civil Service Rifles is situated at Somerset House, London. It was designed in 1923 by Sir Edwin Lutyens OM, KCIE, PRA.

== Bibliography ==
- Beckett, Ian F. W. (1982). Riflemen Form: A study of the Rifle Volunteer Movement 1859–1908, Aldershot: Ogilby Trusts, ISBN 0 85936 271 X.
- The History of the Prince of Wales' Own Civil Service Rifles. London: Wyman & Sons Ltd., 1921.
- Knight, Jill (2004). The Civil Service Rifles in the Great War: All Bloody Gentlemen. Barnsley: Pen & Sword Military, ISBN 1-84415-057-7.
- Merrick, Edward, Lt. (1891). A history of the Civil Service Rifle Volunteers (including the volunteers of the Bank of England). London: Sheppard and St John.
- 2/15th Battalion. County of London Regiment Prince of Wales Own Civil Service Rifles. London: printed by The Art Reproduction Co., 1920.
