= Marshall St John Oswald =

British Army general

Major-General Marshall St John Oswald CB CBE DSO MC
- Allegiance: United Kingdom
- Branch: British Army
- Rank: Major-General
- Conflicts: Second World War
- Awards: Companion of the Order of the Bath; Commander of the Order of the British Empire; Distinguished Service Order; Military Cross

Major-General Marshall St John Oswald CB CBE DSO MC was a British Army officer who served as Director of Military Intelligence.

== Military career ==
Oswald was commissioned into the Royal Artillery. He served in the Second World War during which he was awarded the Military Cross and the Distinguished Service Order.

After the War he became Chief of Staff for I (BR) Corps in 1959 and Director of Military Intelligence in June 1962, in which capacity he dealt with the defection of the intercept operator Brian Patchett, before retiring in 1965.

He was appointed a Commander of the Order of the British Empire in the 1961 Birthday Honours. and a Companion of the Order of the Bath in the 1965 New Year Honours.

Military offices
Preceded by Richard Lloyd	Director of Military Intelligence; 1962–1965	Succeeded by Post disbanded
