= Arthur Shortt =

British Army general

Major-General Arthur Shortt CB OBE
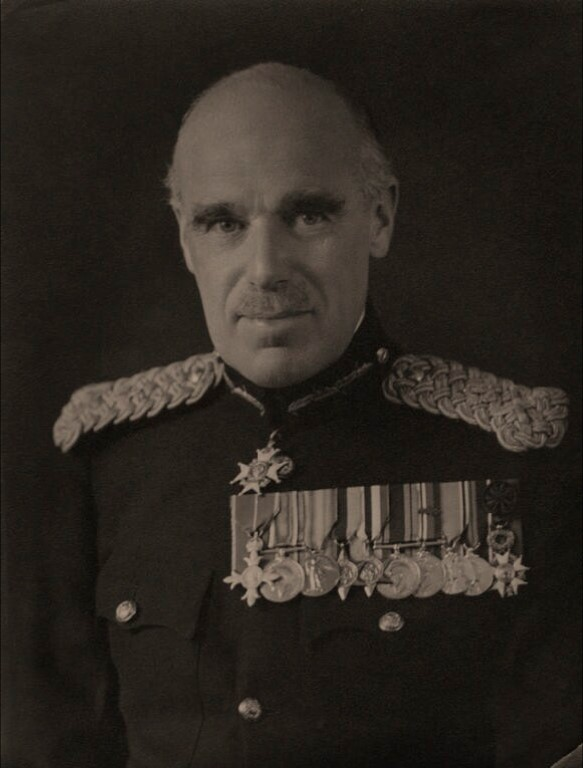
- Born: 2 April 1899; Weare, Somerset
- Died: June 1984 (aged 85)
- Military career
- Allegiance: United Kingdom
- Branch: British Army
- Service years: 1916–1956
- Rank: Major-General
- Service number: 10886
- Unit: Royal Engineers
- Conflicts: First World War; Second World War
- Awards: Companion of the Order of the Bath; Officer of the Order of the British Empire; Mentioned in Despatches; Legion of Honour (France)

Major-General Arthur Charles Shortt, CB, OBE (2 April 1899 – June 1984) was a British Army officer who served as Director of Military Intelligence from 1949 to 1953.

== Military career ==
Shortt was commissioned into the Royal Engineers on 26 August 1916, during the First World War. He served during the interwar period, where he was in charge of a company of Gentlemen Cadets at the Royal Military Academy, Woolwich from January 1931.

Shortt served in the Second World War as Director of Technical Training at the War Office from May 1943, before seeing action in North-West Europe in 1944. He was appointed an Officer of the Order of the British Empire in June 1945.

Shortt became Director of Military Intelligence in December 1949, in which role he regarded the British Army of the Rhine Intelligence Service "as the most important Field Agency on the Soviet Army anywhere". He was appointed a Companion of the Order of the Bath in the 1951 New Year Honours, and went on to be Head of the Joint Services Liaison Staff in Australia in September 1953 before retiring in April 1956.

Military offices
Preceded by Douglas Packard	Director of Military Intelligence; 1949–1953	Succeeded by Valentine Boucher
