= 141st (5th London) Brigade =

5th London Brigade 141st (5th London) Brigade 141st (5th London) Infantry Brigade 141st (London) Infantry Brigade
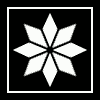
- British 47th (2nd London) Division insignia
- Active: 1908–19; 1920–36; 1939–44; 1944–45
- Country: United Kingdom
- Branch: Territorial Army
- Type: Infantry Brigade
- Part of: 47th (1/2nd London) Division
- Engagements: First World War

Commanders
- Notable commanders: Charles FitzClarence; George Colborne Nugent; Francis Stewart Montague-Bates

The 141st (5th London) Brigade (141 Bde) was an infantry brigade of the Territorial Army, part of the British Army, that served in the First World War and remained in the United Kingdom throughout the Second World War.

== History ==
=== Origin ===
When the Territorial Force was created in 1908 under the Haldane Reforms, the existing volunteer units in the London area were brought together into a new London Regiment and organised into two divisions with a full complement of infantry brigades and supporting arms. 5th London Brigade formed part of 2nd London Division, with the following composition:

- 5th London Brigade Headquarters, Buckingham Gate
- 17th (County of London) Battalion, The London Regiment (Poplar and Stepney Rifles), headquartered in Bow.
- 18th (County of London) Battalion, The London Regiment (London Irish Rifles), headquartered at the Duke of York's Headquarters, Chelsea.
- 19th (County of London) Battalion, The London Regiment (St Pancras), headquartered in Camden Town.
- 20th (County of London) Battalion, The London Regiment (Blackheath & Woolwich) headquartered in Blackheath.
- No 3 (5th London Brigade) Company, 2nd London Divisional Train, Army Service Corps headquartered at the Duke of York's Headquarters

=== First World War ===
The outbreak of war on 4 August saw 5th London Brigade at Perham Down on Salisbury Plain, where it had just arrived for its annual training camp with the rest of 2nd London Division. They were immediately recalled to London to complete their mobilisation and by mid-August 5 London Brigade had reached its war station round Hatfield, Hertfordshire. The County of London Territorial Force Association immediately began raising '2nd Line' battalions, which quickly led to the formation of a duplicate 2/5th London Brigade (eventually 180th Brigade); consequently 5th London Brigade was renumbered 1/5th and its battalions were similarly prefixed (1/17th–1/20th).

In October 1914, 2nd London Division was selected for service on the Western Front and progressive training was carried out through the winter. 5th London Bde was the leading element of the division to land in France on 9 & 10 March 1915. In May the division (already known in France simply as 'The London Division' to distinguish it from the Regular Army 2nd Division) took its place in the line and was designated 47th (1/2nd London) Division, with the brigades numbered consecutively: 5th London became 141st (1/5th London) Brigade.

==== Actions ====
During the First World War, the brigade was engaged in the following operations:

1915

- Battle of Aubers Ridge 9 May
- Battle of Festubert 15–25 May
- Battle of Loos 25 September–1 October
- Battle of the Hohenzollern Redoubt 13–19 October

1916

- Vimy Ridge 21 May
- Battle of the Somme:
  - Battle of Flers-Courcelette 15–19 September
  - Capture of High Wood 15 September
  - Battle of the Transloy Ridges 1–9 October
  - Capture of Eaucourt l'Abbaye 1–3 October
  - Attacks on the Butte de Warlencourt 7–8 October

1917

- Battle of Messines 7–13 June
- 3rd Battle of Ypres:
  - Battle of Pilckem Ridge (in reserve) 31 July–2 August)
  - In the line 18 August–2 September and 8–17 September
- Battle of Cambrai:
  - Capture of Bourlon Wood 28 November
  - German counter-attacks 30 November–3 December

1918

- 1st Battles of the Somme:
  - Battle of St Quentin 21–23 March
  - 1st Battle of Bapaume 24–25 March
  - Battle of the Ancre 5 April
- 2nd Battles of the Somme:
  - Battle of Albert 22–23 August
  - 2nd Battle of Bapaume 31 August–3 September
- Final Advance in Artois:
  - Operations in Artois 2 October–11 November
  - Official Entry into Lille 28 October

==== First World War order of battle ====
There were few changes to the brigade's prewar Order of Battle during the campaign:

- 141st Light Trench Mortar Battery formed June 1915
- 5th London Company ASC became 457th (Horse Transport) Company ASC in August 1915
- 141st Machine Gun Company formed December 1915 (merged into 47th Battalion Machine Gun Corps February 1918)
- 1/17th Bn transferred to 140th (4th London) Brigade when infantry brigades on the Western Front were reduced to a three-battalion establishment in February 1918.

After the Armistice, 47th Division was engaged in railway repair and then settled down around Béthune to await demobilisation. This began in January, and the last troops left France on 10 May 1919. The brigade was demobilised at Felixstowe in May–June 1919.

=== Interwar years ===
47th Division and its subformations began to reform in the redesignated Territorial Army in 1920. 141 Bde was reformed with its original battalions, and with brigade HQ at the Duke of York's Headquarters.

In the 1930s, reorganisation of the TA saw the brigade's units being retasked (the 19th and 20th Bns became searchlight regiments in 1935) and posted away. The brigade was disbanded in 1936.

The rapid expansion of the TA after the Munich Crisis saw 5th London Brigade re-formed with Second Line TA battalions, to provide a duplicate of 2nd London Infantry Brigade. 5th London Brigade resumed its number as 141 (London) Brigade on 21 November 1940.

=== Second World War ===
The composition of 141st (London) Brigade during the Second World War was as follows:

- 2nd Battalion, Queen's Westminsters (King's Royal Rifle Corps) (until 23 November 1940)
- 2nd Battalion, London Scottish (Gordon Highlanders) (to 144th Brigade 9 September 1944)
- 2nd Battalion, London Rifle Brigade (Rifle Brigade) (until 8 December 1940)
- 5th London Infantry Brigade Anti-Tank Company (formed 6 March 1940; became 141 (London) Infantry Brigade Anti-Tank Company; disbanded 28 November 1941)
- 16th Battalion, Royal Fusiliers (1 December 1940; disbanded 18 September 1942)
- 17th Battalion, Royal Fusiliers (17 December 1940; to 140 Brigade 2 October 1942)
- 6th Battalion, Royal Irish Fusiliers (from 140 Bde 2 October 1942; became 2nd Royal Irish Fusiliers 2 May 1944; to 165th Brigade 18 July 1944)
- 30th Battalion, Black Watch (joined 18 September 1942; became 8th Battalion, Black Watch 27 September 1942; disbanded 14 September 1943)
- 4th (City of Dundee) Battalion, Black Watch (joined 6 November 1943; to 165th Brigade 15 July 1944)

The 141st Infantry Brigade did not see any active service in the Second World War. It mobilised as a motor brigade, but became a conventional infantry brigade in June 1940. Between April and October 1944 it was responsible for an embarkation sector in Southampton for the Normandy landings. The brigade was disbanded on 27 October 1944. On 17 November 1944, 220th Brigade (which had recently joined 47th Division, now reformed as a reserve division) was renumbered 141st Infantry Brigade, but without any London connection. The new brigade had the following composition:

- 6th Battalion, Devonshire Regiment
- 8th Battalion, Suffolk Regiment
- 9th Battalion, Dorset Regiment

The brigade was not included in the Territorial Army when it reformed in 1947, although three of its traditional battalions (London Rifle Brigade, London Scottish and London Irish Rifles) formed the bulk of 168th (Lorried) Infantry Brigade in 56th (London) Armoured Division.

== Commanders ==
141 Brigade was commanded by the following officers:

- Brig.-Gen. Charles Fitzclarence, VC (from 9 September 1911)
- Brig.-Gen. G.C. Nugent (from 27 September 1914; killed 31 May 1915)
- Brig.-Gen. William Thwaites (from 2 June 1915)
- Brig.-Gen.R.J. Bridgeford (from 8 July 1916)
- Brig.-Gen. R. McDouall (from 19 August 1916)
- Brig.-Gen. J.F. Erskine (from 26 October 1917; went sick 16 December 1917)
- Brig.-Gen. W.F. Mildren (acting on several occasions; substantive from 2 January 1918; until demobilisation)
- Col. F.S. Montague-Bates (March 1928 – 1932)
- Brig. E.R. Kewley (on outbreak of war)
- Brig. H.A. Freeman-Attwood (from 27 July 1940)
- Brig. A.A. Richardson (from 30 October 1941)
- Brig. V.G. Stokes (from 27 March 1942; wounded 13 April 1942)
- Brig. W.C.A. Hanney (from 27 April 1942 to disbandment of original brigade)
- Brig. A.C.T. Evanson (from 220th Bde)
- Brig E.O. Martin (from 15 January 1945)

== Bibliography ==
- A.F. Becke,History of the Great War: Order of Battle of Divisions, Part 2a: The Territorial Force Mounted Divisions and the 1st-Line Territorial Force Divisions (42–56), London: HM Stationery Office, 1935/Uckfield: Naval & Military Press, 2007, ISBN 1-84734-739-8.
- A.F. Becke,History of the Great War: Order of Battle of Divisions, Part 2b: The 2nd-Line Territorial Force Divisions (57th–69th), with the Home-Service Divisions (71st–73rd) and 74th and 75th Divisions, London: HM Stationery Office, 1937/Uckfield: Naval & Military Press, 2007, ISBN 1-84734-739-8.
- Joslen, H. F. (2003) [1960]. Orders of Battle: Second World War, 1939–1945. Uckfield, East Sussex: Naval and Military Press. ISBN 978-1-84342-474-1.
- Alan H. Maude (ed.), The History of the 47th (London) Division 1914–1919, London: Amalgamated Press, 1922/Uckfield: Naval & Military Press, 2002, ISBN 1-84342-205-0.
