= Richard Eyre Lloyd =

British Army general (1906–1991)

Major-General Richard Eyre Lloyd CB CBE DSO
- Lloyd in 1960
- Born: 7 December 1906; Bolarum, British India
- Died: 10 April 1991 (aged 85 years); New Forest, Hampshire, England
- Military career
- Allegiance: United Kingdom
- Branch: British Army
- Rank: Major-General
- Conflicts: Second World War
- Awards: Companion of the Order of the Bath; Commander of the Order of the British Empire; Distinguished Service Order

Major-General Richard Eyre Lloyd, CB, CBE, DSO (7 December 1906 – 10 April 1991) was a British Army officer who served as Director of Military Intelligence.

== Military career ==
Lloyd was commissioned into the Royal Engineers. He served in the Second World War in North West Europe for which he was awarded the Distinguished Service Order.

After the War he became Assistant Chief of Staff, Intelligence for the British Army of the Rhine in February 1954, Chief of Staff for Middle East Land Forces in June 1957 and Director of Military Intelligence in August 1959 before retiring in June 1962.

He was appointed a Commander of the Order of the British Empire in the 1957 Birthday Honours and a Companion of the Order of the Bath in the 1959 Birthday Honours.

== Personal life ==
Lloyd married Gill Patterson, daughter of Rear-Admiral Julian Patterson, in September 1939. They lived in Germany, Cyprus and London before retiring to Lymington, Hampshire.

Military offices
Preceded by Cedric Price	Director of Military Intelligence; 1959–1962	Succeeded by Marshall Oswald
