= Intelligence agency =

Agency dealing with secret intelligence

An intelligence agency is a government agency responsible for the collection, analysis, and exploitation of information in support of law enforcement, national security, military, public safety, and foreign policy objectives.

Means of information gathering are both overt and covert and may include espionage, communication interception, cryptanalysis, cooperation with other institutions, and evaluation of public sources. The assembly and propagation of this information is known as intelligence analysis or intelligence assessment.

== Objectives ==
Intelligence agencies can provide the following services for their national governments.

- Give early warning of impending crisis;
- Serve national and international crisis management by helping to discern the intentions of current or potential opponents;
- Inform national defense planning and military operations, known as military intelligence;
- Protect sensitive information secrets, both of their own sources and activities, and those of other state agencies;
- Covertly influence the outcome of events in favor of national interests, or influence international security; and
- Defense against the efforts of other national intelligence agencies, known as counterintelligence.

There is a distinction between "security intelligence" and "foreign intelligence". Security intelligence pertains to domestic security and related threats, including terrorism and espionage. Foreign intelligence involves information collection relating to the political, or economic activities of foreign states.

Some agencies have been involved in assassination, arms trafficking, coups d'état, and the placement of misinformation propaganda and other covert and clandestine operations to support their own or their governments' interests.

== Gallery ==
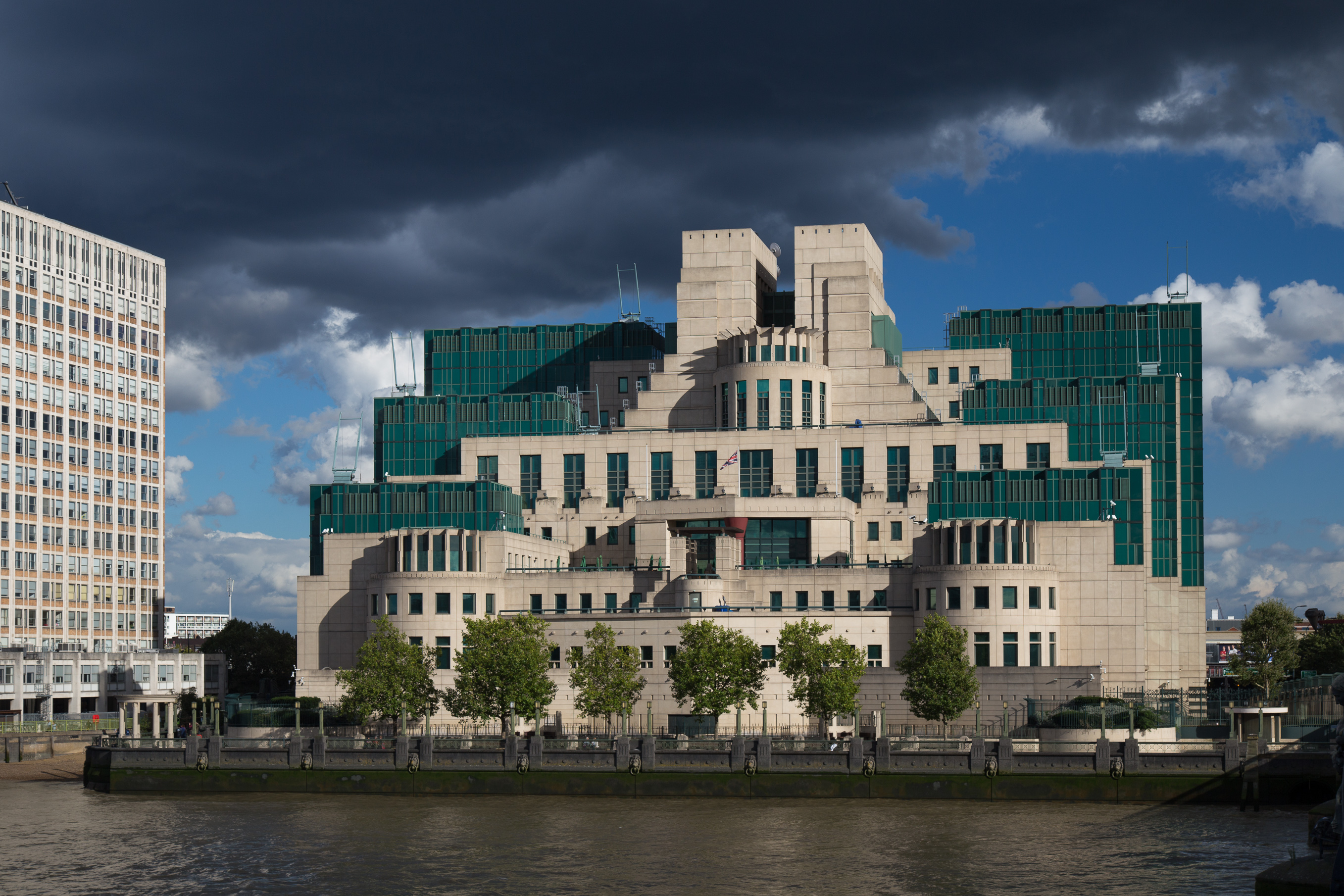
The SIS Building, headquarters of MI6, in London, United Kingdom

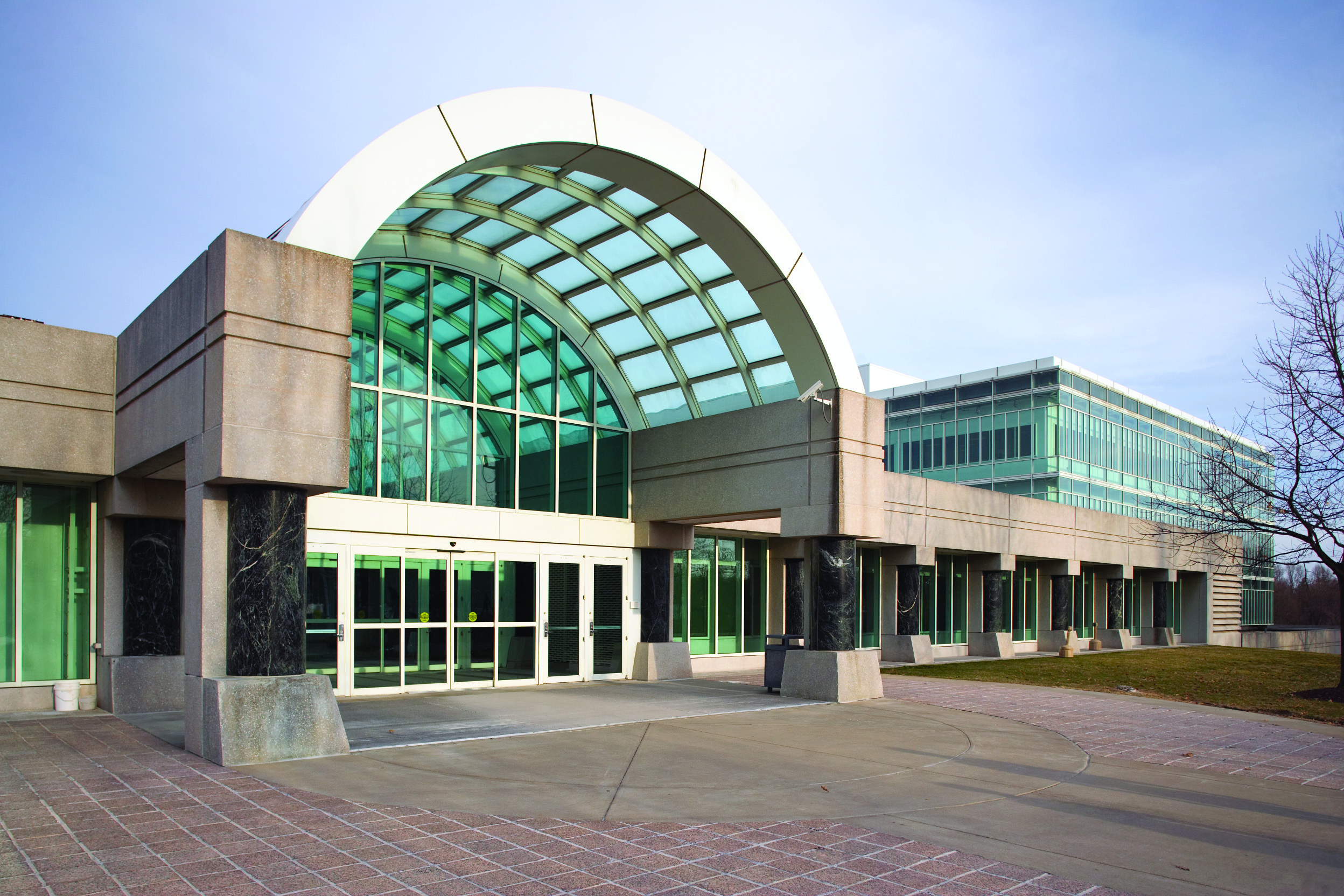
The George Bush Center for Intelligence, headquarters of the Central Intelligence Agency, in Langley, United States

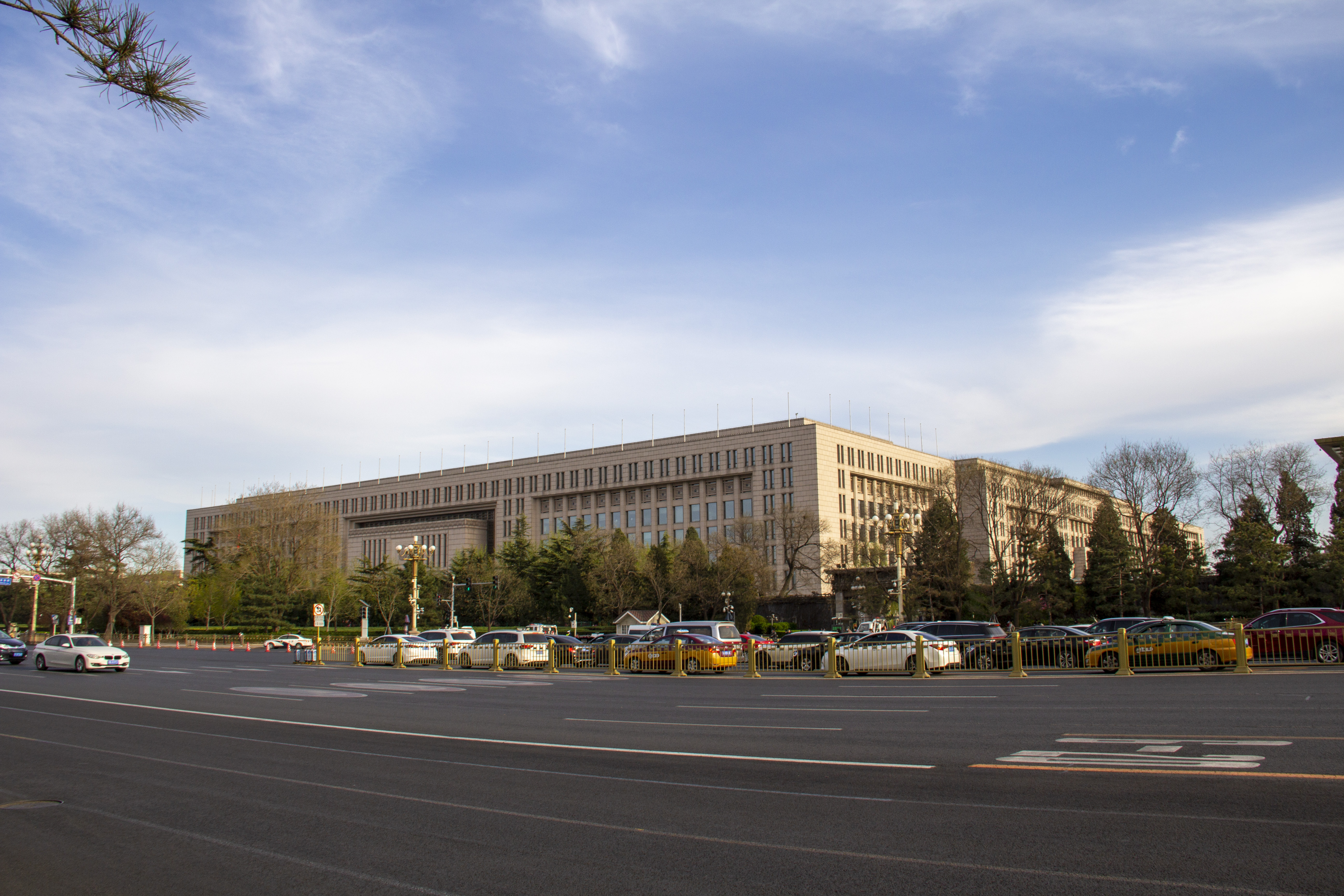
The Ministry of State Security in Beijing, China

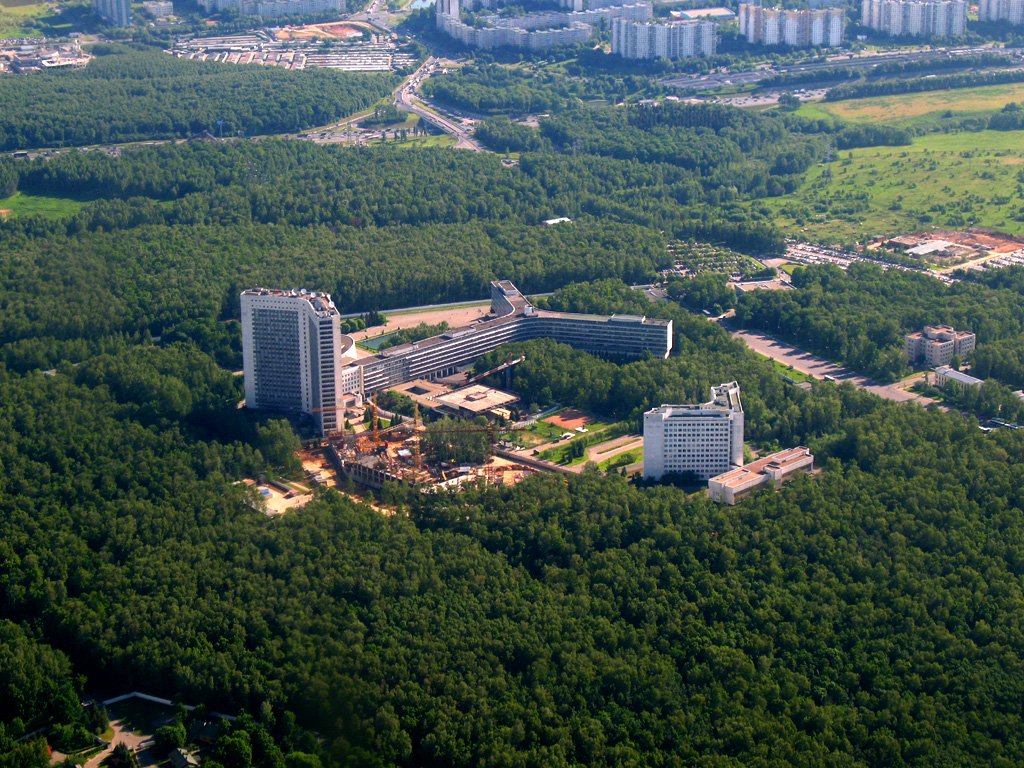
The headquarters of the Foreign Intelligence Service in Moscow, Russia

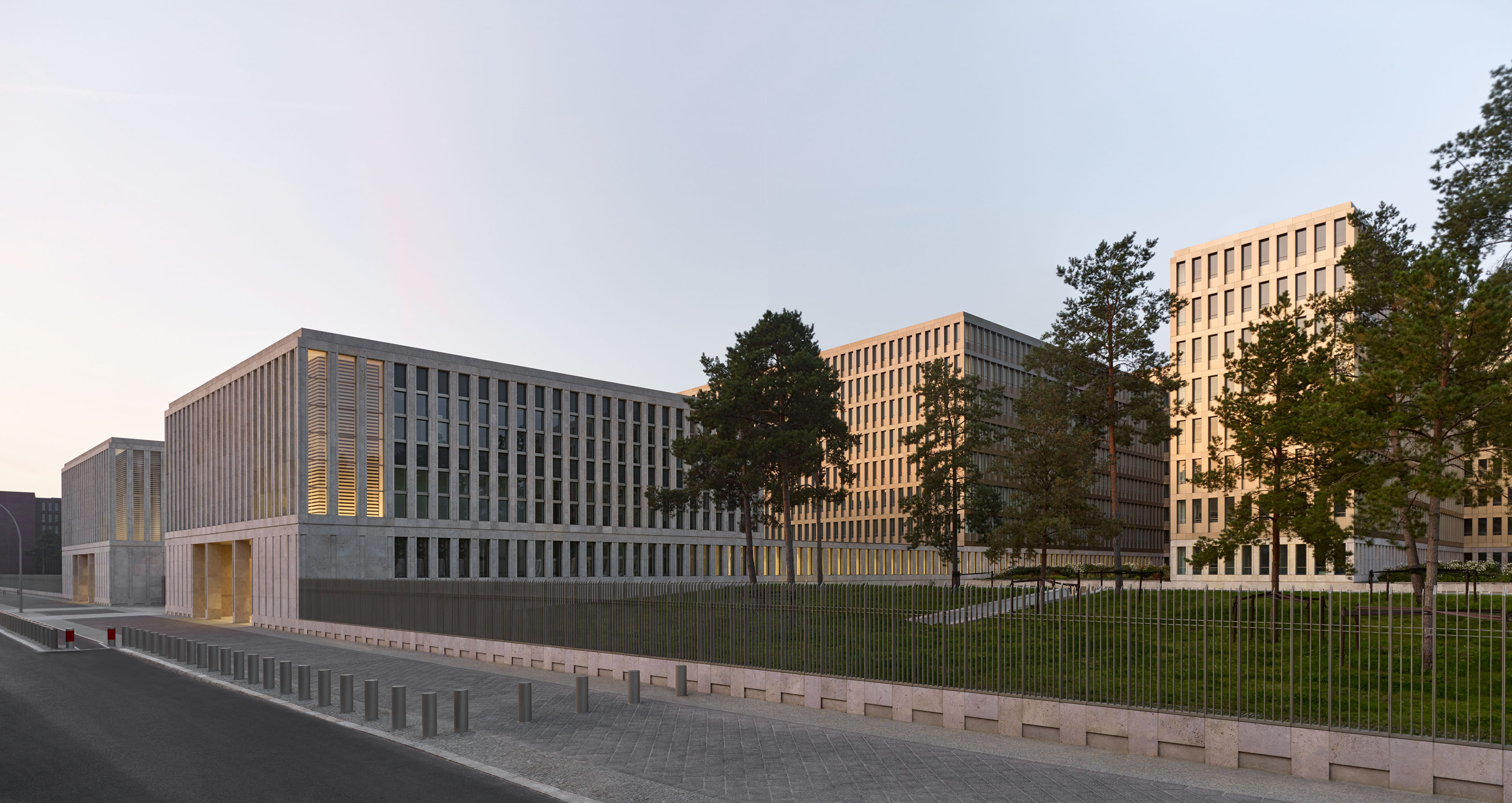
The BND Headquarters, headquarters of the Federal Intelligence Service, in Berlin, Germany

== See also ==
- Counter-intelligence and counter-terrorism organizations
- Intelligence officer
- List of defunct intelligence agencies
- List of intelligence agencies
- List of intelligence gathering disciplines
- Private intelligence agency
- Secret police
- Security agency
- Secret service
- State Security (disambiguation)
