= Cedric Rhys Price =

British Army general

Major-General Cedric Rhys Price CB CBE
- Born: 1905
- Died: 1987 (aged 81−82)
- Allegiance: United Kingdom
- Branch: British Army
- Service years: 1925–1959
- Rank: Major-General
- Service number: 33361
- Conflicts: Second World War
- Awards: Companion of the Order of the Bath; Commander of the Order of the British Empire

Major-General Cedric Rhys Price CB CBE (1905–1987) was a British Army officer who served as Director of Military Intelligence.

== Military career ==
Educated at Selborne College in South Africa and the Royal Military Academy, Woolwich, Rhys Price was commissioned into the Royal Engineers in 1925. He served in the Second World War as an officer in the 56th (London) Division and then as assistant military secretary in the War Office.

After the War he became Chief of Staff to the Chairman of the British Joint Services Mission in Washington, D.C. in 1952, Brigadier on the General Staff at Eastern Command in February 1955 and Director of Military Intelligence in June 1956 before retiring in August 1959.

After leaving the Army he joined the staff of the Secretary of State for Commonwealth Relations. He was appointed a Commander of the Order of the British Empire in the 1945 Birthday Honours and a Companion of the Order of the Bath in the 1951 New Year Honours.

Military offices
Preceded by Valentine Boucher	Director of Military Intelligence; 1956–1959	Succeeded by Richard Lloyd
