= Charles Edward Callwell =

Anglo-Irish officer of the British Army

Major-General Sir Charles Edward Callwell KCB
- Born: 2 April 1859; London, England
- Died: May 1928 (aged 68–69); Queen Alexandra Military Hospital, Millbank, London
- Military career
- Allegiance: United Kingdom
- Branch: British Army
- Rank: Major-General
- Units: Royal Artillery; Royal Garrison Artillery
- Commands: Directorate of Military Operations (1914–1915); Directorate of Military Intelligence (1915–1916)
- Conflicts: Second Anglo-Afghan War; First Boer War; Second Boer War; First World War
- Awards: Knight Commander of the Order of the Bath; Mentioned in Despatches; Legion of Honour (France); Grand Officer of the Order of the Crown (Italy); Order of the Rising Sun, 2nd Class (Japan); Commander of the Order of the Redeemer (Greece); Order of the Crown (Belgium); Order of the Crown (Romania); Order of Saint Stanislaus (Russia); Order of the White Eagle (Serbia)
- Other work: Author

Major-General Sir Charles Edward Callwell, KCB (2 April 1859 – May 1928) was an Anglo-Irish officer of the British Army, who served in the artillery, as an intelligence officer, and as a staff officer and commander during the Second Boer War, and as Director of Operations (DMO) during the First World War. He was also a noted writer of military biography, history, and theory.

== Early life and career ==
Callwell was born in London, the only son of Henry Callwell, of Lismoyne, Ballycastle, County Antrim, by his wife, Maud Martin, of Ross, Connemara. His elder sister Josephine Mary (J.M.) Callwell was a writer. He was educated by a German governess, and then at Haileybury, before entering the Royal Military Academy, Woolwich, in 1876. He was commissioned as a lieutenant in July 1878, joining a battery of the 3rd Brigade, Royal Field Artillery, then stationed in India, and serving in the closing stages of the Second Anglo-Afghan War. In January 1881 his battery was transferred to Natal, arriving just in time to take part in the final operations of the ill-fated expedition against the Transvaal Boers. Shortly afterwards Callwell returned to Woolwich; then in late 1884 he passed the entrance examination to the Staff College, where he was a student from February 1885 into 1886. He was promoted to captain on 17 March 1886.

== Small Wars ==
In 1886 Callwell was awarded the Trench Gascoigne Prize Essay Competition gold medal by the Royal United Service Institution for his essay Lessons to be learned from the campaigns in which British Forces have been employed since the year 1865. This was later expanded into a book Small Wars: Their Principles and Practices, published in 1896, which was adopted as an official British Army textbook, and won wide recognition. In the book, Callwell drew lessons not only from British military engagements, but also French, Spanish, American and Russian campaigns. The book became a "starting point for nearly all counterinsurgency theorists and practitioners."

John M. Gates wrote that:

Callwell's early chapters [highlight] the diverse nature of small wars, the characteristics of asymmetrical conflicts, and the many differences between irregular and regular warfare. Noting the significant dangers of "desultory warfare," Callwell emphasized the importance of taking and maintaining the initiative, but he also recognized the extreme difficulty of achieving it.

The book was revised and republished in 1899 and 1906, was translated in French, and was eagerly read by members of the Irish Republican Army during the Irish War of Independence. The United States Marine Corps Small Wars Manual, originally published in 1935, drew heavily on Callwell's book, and as the first comprehensive study of what came to be known as "asymmetric warfare", it gained renewed popularity in the 1990s, and remains in print. Douglas Porch, in his preface to the 1996 edition called Callwell "the Clausewitz of colonial warfare".

== Intelligence and Staff officer ==
On 1 October 1887 Callwell was seconded for service as a Staff Captain in the Intelligence Branch at Army Headquarters. On 13 July 1891 he was appointed Deputy Assistant Adjutant-General, serving until September 1892, when he returned to the Royal Artillery as a captain. Callwell was seconded for service on the General Staff on 9 September 1893, and was later appointed a brigade major in the Western District of the Royal Artillery, serving until September 1896, having received promotion to the rank of major on 25 March 1896.

On the outbreak of the Greco-Turkish War in April 1897, Callwell was attached to the Greek army and spent a year in the Near East. In October 1899, when war was declared against the Boer Republics in South Africa, Callwell was appointed to the staff of Sir Redvers Buller, and was present throughout the operations which ended with the relief of Ladysmith on 28 February 1900. In September 1901 he received a mention in despatches from Earl Roberts, and was awarded the brevet rank of lieutenant-colonel (dated to 29 November 1900), and given command of a mobile column, with which he served in the Western Transvaal and in Cape Colony until the close of the war in June 1902. He left Cape Town for England the following month, and arrived in Southampton in August 1902.

A year after his return to England, he was appointed a Deputy Assistant Quartermaster-General in the mobilization branch of the War Office on 6 October 1903, and by April 1904 was working in Intelligence once again. On 1 October 1904 he was appointed an Assistant Director of Military Operations, with the substantive rank of Colonel. In June 1907 Callwell was made a Companion of the Bath, at which time he was General Staff Officer, 1st Grade, at Army Headquarters. In October 1907 his appointment to the Staff came to an end and he was placed on half-pay. Having seen several of his contemporaries promoted to general officer rank over his head, Callwell eventually quit the army in June 1909, to devote himself to writing.

== First World War ==
On the outbreak of the First World War in August 1914, Callwell was recalled to active service, being appointed Director of Military Operations (DMO) at the War Office with the temporary rank of major-general. He carried out much important work successfully, not least the preparation of various plans for the organization of the Dardanelles campaign, an operation which he personally opposed. In December 1915, following on the appointment of Sir William Robertson as Chief of the Imperial General Staff, a reorganization took place at the War Office. Operations and intelligence were divided into two independent branches, with Callwell as Director of Military Intelligence (DMI) from 23 December until 3 January 1916, when George Macdonogh took over. Callwell was then sent on a special mission to Russia in connexion with the supply of munitions to that country and with the general question of Russian co-operation in the War.

In April 1916 Callwell was made a Commandeur of the Légion d'honneur by the French, and in June 1916 was awarded the honorary rank of major-general.

On his return to England late in 1916 he was given a position in the Ministry of Munitions as an adviser on questions affecting the supplies of ammunition to the various armies. In June 1917 he was created a Knight Commander of the Bath for his wartime services. Callwell eventually relinquished his position in October 1918, to return to literature and journalism.

In recognition of his wartime service he received the Order of the Rising Sun, 2nd Class, from Japan in October 1918, was made a Grand Officer of the Order of the Crown of Italy in November 1918, and a Commander of the Order of the Redeemer by the King of the Hellenes in October 1919. Callwell also received the Order of the Crown from Belgium, the Order of the Crown from Romania, the Order of Saint Stanislaus from Russia, and the Order of the White Eagle from Serbia.

== Later career ==
From the time of the publication of Small Wars, Callwell had a reputation as a writer on military topics. Mainly these were studies on tactics and on subjects connected with the First World War; he also produced works that satirized army procedure and War Office routine; this may have contributed to his being passed over for promotion. In 1921 he was awarded the Chesney medal of the Royal United Service Institution for his services to military literature.

Major-General Callwell died at Queen Alexandra Military Hospital, Millbank, London, in May 1928. He never married.

== Publications ==
- The Armed Strength of Roumania. 1888.
- Hints on Reconnaissance in Little Known Countries. 1890.
- Wastage in War. 1890.
- Handbook of the Armies of the Minor Balkan States: Roumania, Servia, Bulgaria, Montenegro & Greece. 1891.
- Military Report on North Eastern Turkey in Asia. 1892.
- Small Wars: Their Principles and Practice. 1896, revised 1899 & 1906. Republished: Small Wars: Their Principles and Practice, By C. E. Callwell. Lincoln: University of Nebraska Press, 1996 [1896; 3d ed., 1906]. ISBN 0-8032-6366-X. Index. Pp. xviii, 559. $25.00.
- The Effect of Maritime Command on Land Campaigns since Waterloo. 1897.
- The Tactics of Today. 1908.
- Military Operations and Maritime Preponderance. Their Relations and Interdependence. Edinburgh and London : W. Blackwood and sons. 1905.
- The Tactics of Home Defence. 1908.
- Tirah, 1897. 1911.
- Campaigns and Their Lessons. (Series editor). 1911–1931.
- Service Yarns and Memories. 1912.
- Introduction in A Nation Trained in Arms or a Militia? Lessons from the Past and the Present by Lieutenant-General Baron von Freytag-Loringhoven. 1918.
- The Dardanelles. Boston New York, Houghton Mifflin company. 1919.
- Experiences of a Dug-Out, 1914–1918. London, Constable. 1920.
- The Life of Sir Stanley Maude. London, Constable and Company, Ltd. 1920.
- Stray Recollections. 1923.
- Field Marshal Sir Henry Wilson, Bt, GCB, DSO: His Life & Diaries, etc. 1927.
- The History of the Royal Artillery, from the Indian Mutiny to the Great War. (with Major-General Sir John Headlam). 1931 & 1937.

Military offices
Preceded by Henry Wilson	Director of Military Operations; 1914–1915	Succeeded by Frederick Maurice
New command	Director of Military Intelligence; 1915–1916	Succeeded by George Macdonogh
