= George Macdonogh =

British Army general (1865–1942)

Lieutenant-General Sir George Macdonogh GBE KCB KCMG
- Born: 4 March 1865; Sunderland, England
- Died: 10 July 1942 (aged 77); Teddington, England
- Military career
- Allegiance: United Kingdom
- Branch: British Army
- Service years: 1884–1922
- Rank: Lieutenant-General
- Unit: Royal Engineers
- Conflicts: First World War
- Awards: Knight Grand Cross of the Order of the British Empire; Knight Commander of the Order of the Bath; Knight Commander of the Order of St Michael and St George; Mentioned in Despatches; Knight's Cross of the Order of St. Sylvester (Holy See)

Lieutenant-General Sir George Mark Watson Macdonogh, GBE, KCB, KCMG (4 March 1865 – 10 July 1942) was a senior officer in the British Army. After early service in the Royal Engineers he became a staff officer prior to the outbreak of the First World War. His main role in the war was as Director of Military Intelligence at the War Office in 1916–18.

== Early military career ==
Macdonogh was born on 4 March 1865, son of George Valentine MacDonogh, Deputy Inspector of the Royal Naval Hospital, Greenwich. He was commissioned as a second lieutenant in the Royal Engineers on 5 July 1884. Ian Beckett comments that he had "considerable intellectual ability" but was "diffident and taciturn". He was promoted to captain on 22 October 1892.

In 1896 he entered the Staff College, Camberley by examination. The normal order of results was varied in order to conceal the fact that he and his contemporary James Edmonds were far ahead of the other entrants. Both men found their studies easy, and whilst Edmonds wrote a History of the American Civil War in his spare time MacDonogh studied law, qualifying as a barrister at Lincoln's Inn in 1897.

MacDonogh, who was fluent in several Scandinavian languages, married Aline Borgstrom of Helsingfors (Helsinki) on 8 November 1898. They had one son, who died of natural causes in 1915.

From November 1898 to November 1899 he was deputy assistant adjutant general, Royal Engineers, in Dublin. From December 1899 to August 1903 he was secretary (brigade major) of the School of Military Engineering at Chatham, Kent. He was promoted to major on 1 April 1901. In September 1903 he was appointed deputy assistant quartermaster general for Thames District. On 27 October 1906 he was appointed as a staff captain in the War Office. On 1 January 1908 he was appointed a GSO2 at the War Office and on 22 January 1909 was promoted to lieutenant colonel.

On 30 October 1912 he was promoted colonel and appointed a GSO1 at the War Office. He succeeded Edmonds as head of MO5, drafting measures to control aliens in the event of war. Henry Wilson, director of military operations, distrusted him as a convert from Methodism to Roman Catholicism. In March 1914 Macdonogh was one of the few officers in the War Office willing to coerce Protestant Ulster during the Curragh incident.

== First World War and after ==
In August 1914 he was appointed a GSO1 (Intelligence) at British Expeditionary Force GHQ. On 10 December he was promoted to the temporary rank of brigadier general, although this was later antedated to 7 November, and was assigned to the BEF's general staff. He performed distinguished service predicting enemy troop movements at the First Battle of Ypres and again predicting an enemy gas attack on the BEF's Second Army in December 1915.

On Sir William Robertson's promotion from Chief of Staff BEF to CIGS, Macdonogh was brought back to London. On 3 January 1916 he was promoted to Director of Military Intelligence at the War Office, with the permanent rank of major general, which was awarded "for distinguished service in the Field". By May 1917 he had an accurate picture of the entire German Army in the west, except for a single Landwehr regiment. He helped to create the propaganda department MI7(b) which became very active from the summer of 1917. He conducted operations to reduce German domestic morale.

Macdonogh was distrusted by Haig and Haig's intelligence adviser John Charteris, with whom he had an acrimonious correspondence. He presented figures to the War Cabinet in October 1917, pouring cold water on Haig's predictions that German manpower would be exhausted by the end of the year. An infamous entry in Haig's diary (15 October 1917) mentions that Macdonogh "is a Roman Catholic and is (perhaps unconsciously) influenced by information which reaches him from tainted (that is, Catholic) sources". He also predicted the date, time and location of the German March 1918 "Michael" Offensive, as did Charteris.

Macdonogh was appointed Adjutant-General to the Forces on 11 September 1918, a post he held until September 1922. He succeeded General Sir Nevil Macready and was promoted to temporary lieutenant general whilst holding this position. He was considered for the position of British liaison officer with the White Russian leader Admiral Kolchak, but not appointed. He was promoted to substantive lieutenant general on 10 September 1922 and retired from the army on 11 September 1925.

Macdonogh was appointed a Companion of the Order of the Bath in 1915, a Knight Commander of the Order of St Michael and St George in 1917, a Knight Commander of the Order of the Bath in 1920, and a Knight Grand Cross of the Order of the British Empire on retirement.

== Post-military life ==
Macdonogh served on the Royal Commission on Local Government 1923–1929. He held numerous directorships in business, banking and manufacturing, and was President of the Federation of British Industries in 1933–4. He was a Commissioner of the Imperial War Graves Commission. He was active in the London Zoological Society and the Royal Institute of International Affairs.

During the Winter War of 1939–40, when Finland was being attacked by the USSR he was President of the Anglo-Finnish Society, Vice-President of the Finland Fund, and a member of the Finnish Aid Bureau in 1940. In 1939–41 he served on the Control Committee for Regulation of Prices.

Macdonogh died at the age of 77 on 10 July 1942, at Teddington, Middlesex. His estate was valued for probate at £53,784 1s 10d (over £2,000,000 at 2016 prices).

== Sources ==
- Matthew, Colin, ed. (2004). Dictionary of National Biography. Vol. 35. Oxford: Oxford University Press. ISBN 978-0198614111., essay on Macdonogh written by Ian Beckett.
- Ian F. W. Beckett (2004) "Macdonogh, Sir George Mark Watson (1865–1942)", Oxford Dictionary of National Biography, Oxford University Press, Sept 2004; online edition, accessed 16 Oct 2008
- National Archives for: "Macdonogh, Sir George Mark Watson (1865–1942) Knight Lieutenant General"

Military offices
| Preceded by Charles Callwell | Director of Military Intelligence; 1916–1918 | Succeeded by William Thwaites |
| Preceded by Sir Nevil Macready | Adjutant General; 1918–1922 | Succeeded by Sir Philip Chetwode |
