= William Thwaites =

British Army general

General Sir William Thwaites KCB KCMG
- Born: 9 June 1868; Kensington, London, England
- Died: 22 June 1947 (aged 79); Reading, Berkshire, England
- Military career
- Allegiance: United Kingdom
- Branch: British Army
- Service years: 1887–1929
- Rank: General
- Commands: Territorial Army; British Army of the Rhine; 47th (2nd London) Division; 46th (North Midland) Division; 141st (5th London) Brigade
- Conflicts: Second Boer War; First World War
- Awards: Knight Commander of the Order of the Bath; Knight Commander of the Order of St Michael and St George

General Sir William Thwaites, KCB, KCMG (9 June 1868 – 22 June 1947) was a British Army officer who served with distinction on the Western Front during the First World War, most notably in command of the 46th (North Midland) Division for over two years, from 1916 to 1918. He ended his career as commander of the British Army of the Rhine during the interwar period.

== Early life and education ==
William Thwaites was born in June 1868 in Kensington, the son of William Thwaites of Durham Villas. He was educated at Wellington College, Berkshire, and at Heidelberg before passing into the Royal Military Academy, Woolwich.

== Early military career ==
Thwaites was commissioned as a second lieutenant into the Royal Artillery on 16 February 1887.

He was promoted to lieutenant on 16 February 1890 and to captain on 10 October 1897.

He served in the Second Boer War from 1899 to 1900 as an adjutant of the 33rd Brigade, Royal Field Artillery (RFA), and took part in operations in Natal in late 1899, including engagements at Rietfontein and Lombard's Knop and the defence of Ladysmith. For his service he was mentioned in despatches.

Following his return to the United Kingdom, he served as divisional adjutant in Kildare until late 1902, after he was promoted to major on 20 August 1902.

In February 1912 he was seconded for service on the staff and appointed as a general staff officer, grade 2 (GSO2) of the 2nd London Division of the Territorial Force (TF).

== First World War ==
He was confirmed as general staff officer, grade 1 (GSO1), of the 2nd London Division on 5 August, the day after the British entry into the First World War. As the division's senior staff officer, he spent the first months of the war in Britain and helped in the initial organisation and training of the division before it was deployed to the Western Front to join the British Expeditionary Force (BEF) in March 1915, and was soon after redesignated as the 47th (2nd London) Division. He continued in this role during the division's initial engagements at the battles of Aubers and Festubert.

After being promoted to the temporary rank of brigadier general in June 1915, he took command of the 141st (5th London) Infantry Brigade, part of the 47th Division, taking over from its previous commander, Brigadier General George Colborne Nugent, who had been killed.

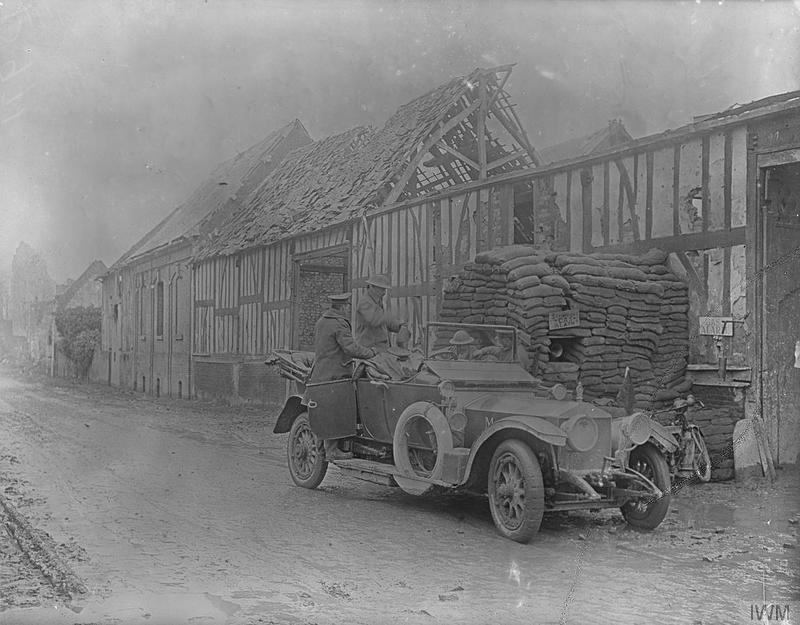
Major General William Thwaites outside the headquarters of the 1st/8th Battalion, Sherwood Foresters, at The Brasserie, Fonquevillers, France, March 1917. Showing Strombos horn and shell case gas alarms.

On 23 May 1916, "when the brigade headquarters was at Cabaret Rouge", southwest of Lens, he "was wounded at 11.30 pm. It also reported that he was wounded at 7.47 am. on the following day". However, as command of the brigade had by now passed to Lieutenant Colonel Tredennick "at 12.30 am on the 24th" he was most likely wounded on the 23rd.

He remained in command of the brigade for over a year until being promoted to the temporary rank of major general and made general officer commanding (GOC) of the 46th (North Midland) Division, another TF formation, in July 1916. He succeeded Major General Edward Montagu-Stuart-Wortley, who had been controversially dismissed following the division's failure at Gommecourt during the Battle of the Somme. He was appointed a Companion of the Order of the Bath (CB) "for valuable services rendered in connection with Military Operations in the Field" in January 1917. His major general's rank became substantive in June 1918 "for distinguished service in connection with Military Operations in France and Flanders".

Towards the end of the war Thwaites became director of military intelligence at the War Office in London from September 1918, taking over from Lieutenant General Sir George Macdonogh.

== Post-war and final years ==
He was then director of military operations and intelligence from 1922. In July 1923 he succeeded Major General Nevill Smyth as GOC of the Territorial Army's 47th (2nd London) Division. He was promoted to lieutenant general while still commanding the division in October 1926, and was in April 1927 appointed general officer commanding-in-chief (GOC-in-C) of the British Army of the Rhine (BAOR): he was the last person to hold this post until after the Second World War. He became colonel commandant of the Royal Artillery in January 1929.

In July 1931, after being made a general in May, he was appointed an aide-de-camp general to King George V, in succession to General Sir Philip Chetwode. He was then director general of the TA from later that year until 1933, and retired from the army, after forty-six years of service, on 1 October 1933, when he was appointed an extra aide-de-camp general to King George V. He relinquished this assignment in July 1935.

He died in June 1947 at the age of 79.

Military offices
Preceded by Edward Montagu-Stuart-Wortley	GOC 46th (North Midland) Division; 1916–1918	Succeeded by Gerald Boyd
Preceded by George Macdonogh	Director of Military Intelligence (Director of Military Operations and Intelligence from 1922); 1918–1923	Succeeded by John Burnett-Stuart
Preceded by Sir Nevill Smyth	GOC 47th (2nd London) Division; 1923–1927	Succeeded by Leopold Oldfield
Preceded by Sir John Du Cane	Commander-in-Chief of the British Army of the Rhine; 1927–1929	Command disbanded
