= John Burnett-Stuart =

British Army general (1875–1958)

General Sir John Burnett-Stuart GCB KBE CMG DSO DL
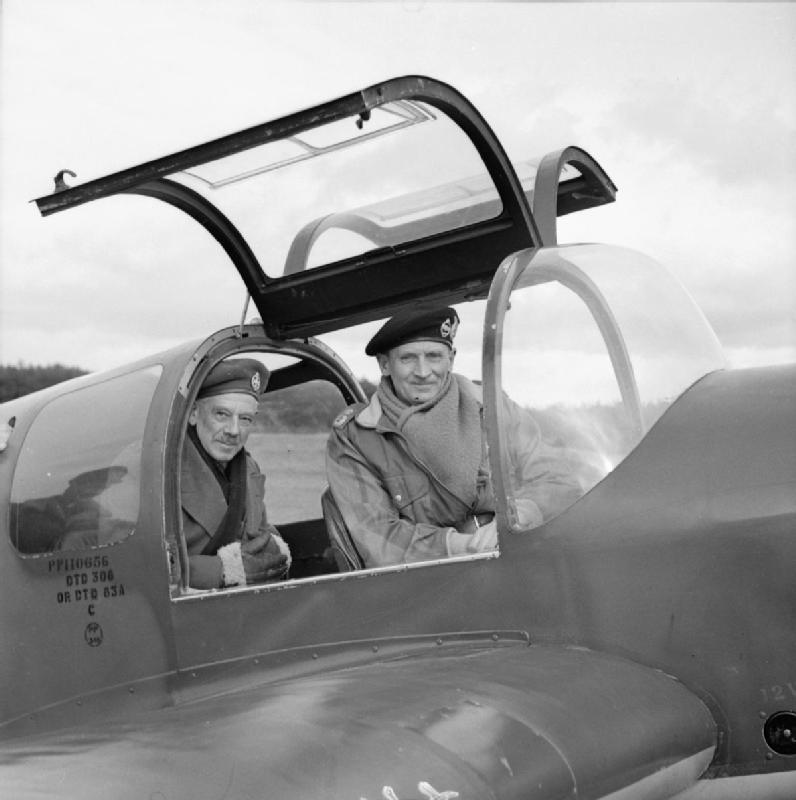
- Field Marshal Sir Bernard Montgomery and General Burnett-Stuart (left) in the cockpit of Montgomery's personal aircraft in North-west Europe, 8 March 1945
- Born: 14 March 1875; Cirencester, Gloucestershire, England
- Died: 6 October 1958 (aged 83); Avington Park, Winchester, Hampshire, England
- Military career
- Allegiance: United Kingdom
- Branch: British Army
- Service years: 1895–1938
- Rank: General
- Service number: 349
- Unit: Rifle Brigade (The Prince Consort's Own)
- Commands: Southern Command; British Troops in Egypt; 3rd Division; Madras District
- Conflicts: North-West Frontier; Second Boer War; First World War; Malabar Rebellion
- Awards: Knight Grand Cross of the Order of the Bath; Knight Commander of the Order of the British Empire; Companion of the Order of St Michael and St George; Distinguished Service Order
- Other work: Deputy lieutenant for Aberdeenshire

General Sir John Theodosius Burnett-Stuart, GCB, KBE, CMG, DSO, DL (14 March 1875 – 6 October 1958) was a British Army general in the 1920s and 1930s.

== Military career ==
Educated at Repton School and the Royal Military College, Sandhurst, John Burnett-Stuart was commissioned into the Rifle Brigade (The Prince Consort's Own) as a second-lieutenant on 6 March 1895. He was promoted to lieutenant on 26 July 1897, and saw service on the North-West Frontier of India between 1897 and 1898.

He also served in the Second Boer War in South Africa between 1899 and 1902, during which he was promoted to captain on 20 February 1901, and awarded the Distinguished Service Order in 1900. Following the end of the war in June 1902, Burnett-Stuart returned to the United Kingdom on the SS Orotava which arrived at Southampton in early September.

He was promoted to brevet major in July 1911, while serving as a GSO1 with the New Zealand Military Forces and while holding the local rank of lieutenant colonel.

Burnett-Stuart, promoted in August 1914 to temporary lieutenant colonel, served in the First World War as a General Staff Officer in the British Expeditionary Force, rising to become Deputy Adjutant General at General Headquarters for the British Armies in France in 1917. He was appointed a Companion of the Order of the Bath in January 1917.

After the war, in June 1919, he was promoted to substantive major general. and was appointed General Officer Commanding Madras District in India where he was involved in the suppression of the Moplah Rebellion at Malabar between 1921 and 1922. The riots that he quashed were inspired by 10,000 guerrillas and led to 2,300 executions.

Burnett-Stuart returned to the United Kingdom and became Director of Military Operations and Intelligence at the War Office in September 1922, taking over from Major General Sir William Thwaites, and then General Officer Commanding 3rd Division, taking over from Lieutenant General Sir William Heneker in July 1926. In 1927 he directed exercises by an experimental Mechanised force on Salisbury Plain in Wiltshire. He relinquished this position in May 1930 and was appointed GOC British Troops in Egypt in June 1931 and General Officer Commanding-in-Chief of Southern Command in 1934: he retired in 1938.

Burnett-Stuart was also aide-de-camp general to King George V from 1935 to 1938 and colonel commandant of the 1st Battalion, Rifle Brigade, from 1936 to 1945. He commanded the 1st Aberdeen Battalion of the Home Guard and was Deputy Lieutenant for Aberdeenshire.

Military offices
Preceded by Sir William Thwaites	Director of Military Operations and Intelligence; 1923–1926	Succeeded by Sir Ronald Charles
Preceded by Sir William Heneker	GOC 3rd Division; 1926–1930	Succeeded by Sir Harry Knox
Preceded by Sir Peter Strickland	GOC British Troops in Egypt; 1931–1934	Succeeded by Sir George Weir
Preceded by Sir Percy Radcliffe	GOC-in-C Southern Command; 1934–1938	Succeeded by Sir Archibald Wavell
Preceded by Sir Cameron Shute	Colonel-Commandant of the 1st Battalion, Rifle Brigade (The Prince Consort's Own); 1936–1945	Succeeded by Sir Ralph Eastwood
