= Douglas Packard =

British Army general

Lieutenant-General Sir Douglas Packard KBE CB DSO
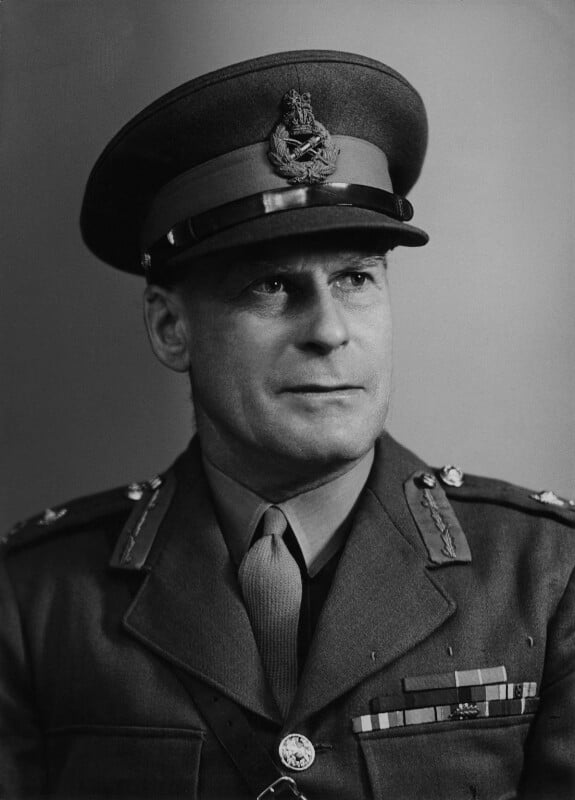
- Packard, c. 1950
- Born: 17 May 1903
- Died: 1999 (aged 95–96)
- Military career
- Allegiance: United Kingdom
- Branch: British Army
- Service years: 1923–1961
- Rank: Lieutenant-General
- Service number: 26992
- Unit: Royal Artillery
- Commands: Northern Ireland Command (1958–1961); 36th Infantry Brigade (1944); 1st Regiment Royal Horse Artillery (1942–1944)
- Conflicts: Second World War
- Awards: Knight Commander of the Order of the British Empire; Companion of the Order of the Bath; Distinguished Service Order; Mentioned in Despatches

Lieutenant-General Sir Charles Douglas Packard, KBE, CB, DSO (17 May 1903 – November 1999) was a British Army officer who achieved high office in the 1950s.

== Military career ==
After graduating from the Royal Military Academy, Woolwich, Packard was commissioned into the Royal Artillery on 29 August 1923. Orde Wingate and Richard Goodbody were among his fellow graduates, both of whom also rose to general officer's rank. He was promoted to lieutenant on 29 August 1925.

Packard served in the Second World War in the Middle East and Italy, becoming commander of the 1st Regiment Royal Horse Artillery in 1942, commander Royal Artillery for the Tenth Army Group in 1943 and commander Royal Artillery for the 78th Division later in 1944. He was them appointed commander of the 36th Infantry Brigade also in 1944 and Deputy Chief of Staff for the 15th Army Group in 1945. He was promoted to the acting rank of major general on 11 September 1945, shortly after the war ended.

After the war Packard was appointed Chief of Staff for the British Element of the Allied Commission for Austria before becoming Director of Military Intelligence at the War Office in 1948. He was made commander of the British Military Mission to Greece in 1949 and Chief of Staff Middle East Land Forces in 1951. He became Vice Quartermaster General at the War Office in 1953 and Military Advisor to West African Governments in 1956. He went on to be General Officer Commanding Northern Ireland District in 1958 and General Officer Commanding-in-Chief, Northern Ireland Command in 1959. He retired in 1961.

== Retirement ==
In 1962 Packard advised Edgar Whitehead, Prime Minister of Rhodesia, on certain matters relating to the British South Africa Police then operating in Rhodesia.

He died in November 1999.

Military offices
Preceded by Gerald Templer	Director of Military Intelligence; 1948–1949	Succeeded by Arthur Shortt
Preceded by Sir Brian Kimmins	General Officer Commanding the British Army in Northern Ireland; 1959–1961	Succeeded by Sir John Hackett
