= MI2 =

Department of British military intelligence (historical)

MI2, the British Military Intelligence Section 2, was a department of the British Directorate of Military Intelligence, part of the War Office. It was originally set up to handle geographic information. Its subsections in 1914 included:

- MI2a: the Americas (excluding Canada), Spain, Portugal, Italy, Liberia, Tangier, and the Balkans
- MI2b: Ottoman Empire, Trans-Caucasus, Arabia, Sinai, Abyssinia, North Africa excluding French and Spanish possessions, Egypt, and the Sudan

After the First World War, its role was changed to handle Russian and Scandinavian intelligence. These functions were absorbed into MI3 in 1941.
