= Polish Agency of Trade Information =

Polish Agency of Trade Information (Polish language: Polska Agencja Informacji Handlowej, PAIH) was a Polish industrial espionage agency, formed in Warsaw, in December 1932. Officially, it was presented as a private body, but the PAIH was financially supported by the Ministry of Military Affairs, and was overseen by the Second Department of Polish General Staff, a military intelligence agency. The agency ceased to exist in September 1939 following the Invasion of Poland.

== Activities ==
The creation of the PAIH was a Polish response to the activities of foreign industrial espionage services. They actively operated on the territory of the Second Polish Republic, and the government in Warsaw was unable to effectively control them. The foreign services gained information about Polish heavy industry, in order to analyze the defensive abilities of the Polish Army.

All activities of the PAIH were ordered by the Second Department of the General Staff. The agency provided information and opinion about enterprises operating in Poland, especially those which cooperated with the Army. In PAIH’s reports, their loyalty to the Polish state was analyzed, together with their competences and professionalism.

In a 1937 analysis, PAIH experts emphasized several negative situations in the Polish economy, especially in those enterprises which belonged to the foreign capital. It pointed out that three companies which extracted lead ("Giesche", "Gepner", "Wyrgumet"), decided to cut their production in Poland, while Polish neighbors increased led extraction. Other examples of negative situations, revealed by the PAIH were:

- the agreement of British-owned company Schicht-Lever SA and German-owned company Zaklady Przemyslowe E. Kollontaya, against Polish plans of gaining independence from foreign exports,
- actions against Polish batteries manufacturers, initiated by foreign companies, such as German-Swedish consortium Ericsson-Niffe,
- wrong bookkeeping and draining of Warsaw Power Plant by French-owned company Compagnie d’Electricite a Varsovie,
- closing of several Polish sugar plants by a foreign sugar cartel, which claimed financial losses. This was negative to the interests of the Polish state, as sugar and sugar products were necessary for the Polish Army,
- cooperation of purveyors of raw hide to the Army, aimed at raising the price of this product.

By the mid-1930s, the PAIH grew to such a degree that it needed financial support from the Army. In 1932–34, Polish General Staff supported it with 2,000–4,000 zlotys monthly. Since each report, created by PAIH experts, was paid for by the army and government agencies, such as the Ministry of Trade, in 1936 profits of the agency amounted to 36,000 zlotys. By 1937, the agency had its branches in Katowice, Gdynia, Łódź, Poznań and Lwów. It also had 4,500 field correspondents and 200 qualified informants.

In comparison to German industrial espionage agencies (Sonderdienst Nuntia, which in 1930 was incorporated into the Abwehr, and Sicherheitsdienst IG Farben Leverkusen, owned by the IG Farben), the activities of the PAIH were much more limited, due to better organization of German agencies. Furthermore, Minister Jozef Beck did not want to spoil Polish-German relations, and restrained the PAIH, to the advantage of the Germans.

== See also ==
- Agencja Bezpieczeństwa Wewnętrznego
- History of Polish intelligence services
