= Hoankyoku =

Intelligence agency in Manchuria

The Hoankyoku (Chinese and Japanese: 保安局; pinyin: Bǎo'ānjú; Wade–Giles: Pao^{3}-an^{1}-chü^{2}; Hiragana: ほあんきょく) was an intelligence agency established in the State of Manchuria.

== Background ==
The State of Manchuria was founded in 1932, but within the country there were many anti-establishment forces operating. As well as bandits and remnants of former military parties, there were Kuomintang, Chinese Communist Party, and Soviet underground groups operating. Above all else, members of the Kuomintang had infiltrated the Manchurian bureaucracy.

The police, whose job it was to crack down on anti-establishment forces, was made up of many ethnicities, making the concealing of classified information difficult. Therefore, a secret organization that possessed a level of confidentiality higher than even the Tokkō, and whose existence itself was also secret, was considered.

The Hoankyoku was established in December 1937 (Kokutoku 4). As it was a secret organization it was disguised as a division of the police. It had a close relationship with the Kwantung Army, and received guidance from members of the Kwantung Army's secret police. All heads within the organization were Japanese.

== Structure ==
As at 1944 (Kokutoku 11)

- Division 1 (general affairs)
- Division 2 (investigations)
- Division 3 (general counterintelligence)
- Division 4 (foreign counterintelligence)
- Division 5 (secret information)
- Division 6 (wireless counterintelligence and unauthorized radio-wave search)
- Division 7 (communication counterintelligence)
- Division 8 (secret war science)
- Ryokuen Institute (training)

== Works cited ==
- 満州国史編纂刊行会 (Manshū Kokushi Hensan Kankōkai), ed. (1970). 満州国史 [Manchurian History] (in Japanese). Vol. 各論 (Kakuron). 満蒙同胞援護会 (Manmō Dōhō Engokai).
