= MI15 =

Department of British military intelligence (historical)

MI15, the British Military Intelligence Section 15, was a department of the British Directorate of Military Intelligence, part of the War Office. It was set up in 1942 to handle aerial photography (compare with MI4).

In 1943, this function was transferred to the air ministry and MI15 was responsible for the coordination of intelligence about enemy anti-aircraft facilities.

== See also ==
- MI5
