= MI3 =

Former British Military Intelligence Section

MI3, the British Military Intelligence Section 3, was a division of the British Directorate of Military Intelligence, part of the War Office. It was originally set up to handle geographical information. Its subsections in 1914 included:

- MI3a: France, Belgium, Luxembourg, Morocco.
- MI3b: Austria-Hungary and Switzerland.
- MI3c: Germany.
- MI3d: The Netherlands, Norway, Sweden and Denmark.
- MI3e: Military translations.

After World War I, its role was changed to intelligence in Europe, later including the Baltic states, USSR and Scandinavia after Summer 1941. MI3 was headed by Major David Talbot Rice. He recommended the change from supporting the Chetniks to supporting the Partisans in Yugoslavia, see Yugoslavia and the Allies. Its functions were absorbed into MI6 in 1945.
