= MI17 =

Department of British military intelligence (historical)

MI17, or Military Intelligence, section 17, was the secretariat to the other departments of the British Directorate of Military Intelligence. It was established in April 1943 and provided coordination between the departments.
