= MI4 =

Department of British military intelligence (historical)

MI4, the British Military Intelligence Section 4, was a department of the British Directorate of Military Intelligence, part of the War Office. It was originally set up to handle topographical information including the preparation and issue of maps for the armed forces.

These functions were absorbed into the Geographical Section, General Staff in 1941 and then into the Directorate of Military Survey under Brigadier Martin Hotine in 1943.
