= Subsecretaria de Inteligência =

The Subsecretaria de Inteligência (Under-Secretariat of Intelligence) or SSI was the Brazilian Intelligence Agency that replaced the Brazilian military junta intelligence agency called the SNI. In 1995, the SSI was replaced by the ABIN.

This Subsecretaria de Inteligência was subordinated to the Secretaria de Assuntos Estratégicos (Strategic Affairs Secretariat) or SAE, which replaced the SNI during the Fernando Collor de Mello government (see this document) and was replaced by the ABIN in the FHC government (1997). In the Luiz Inácio Lula da Silva government the ABIN received more powers for telephone tampering.
