= MI10 =

Department of British military intelligence (historical)

MI10, or Military Intelligence, section 10, was a department of the British Directorate of Military Intelligence, part of the War Office. It was established in the middle of 1940 and was responsible for weapons and technical analysis during World War II and early in the Cold War.

Despite one source claiming that the group was merged into MI16 (scientific intelligence) when the latter was created near the end of the war, it was in fact working all the way through 1961 at least, e. g. publishing military equipment recognition handbooks

During the war department's three subdivisions had following responsibilities:

- MI10(a) was studying enemy AFVs;
- MI10(b)—engineering equipment;
- MI10(c)—transportation, oil and military science.

The distribution changed after 1945:

- MI10(a)—weapons technology;
- MI10(b)—radar technology;
- MI10(c)—guided weapons and chemical warfare.
