= George Colborne Nugent =

British Army general (1864–1915)

Brigadier-General George Colborne Nuget MVO
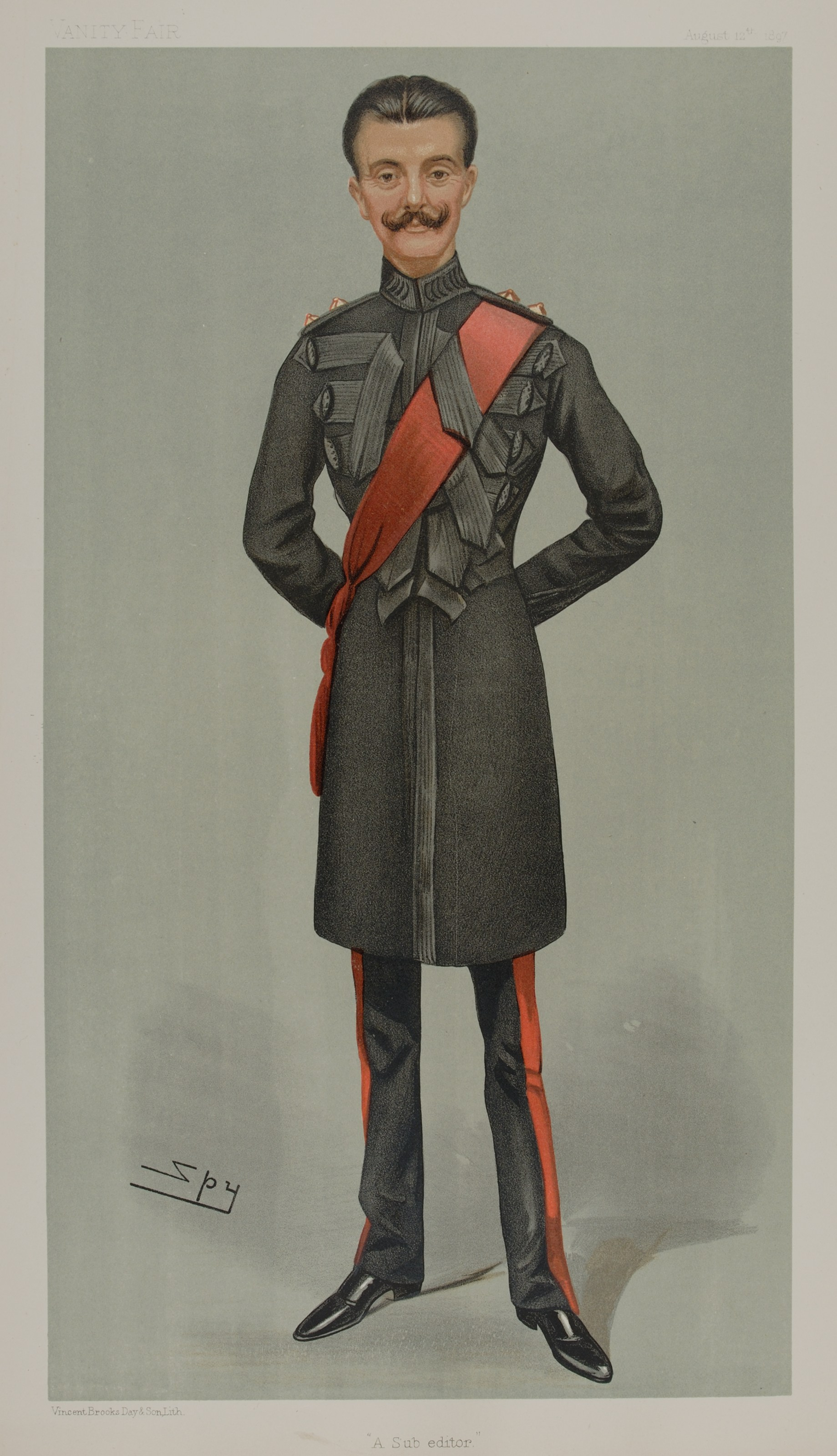
- Vanity Fair caricature by Spy (Leslie Ward), 12 August 1897
- Born: 22 February 1864; City of Westminster, London, England
- Died: 31 May 1915 (aged 51); Western Front
- Military career
- Allegiance: United Kingdom
- Branch: British Army
- Service years: 1881–1915
- Rank: Brigadier-General
- Units: Norfolk Regiment; Grenadier Guards; Irish Guards
- Commands: 1st Battalion, Irish Guards; 141st (5th London) Brigade
- Conflicts: Second Boer War; First World War
- Awards: Member of the Royal Victorian Order

Brigadier-General George Colborne Nugent, MVO (22 February 1864 – 31 May 1915) was a British Army officer who served on the staff during the Second Boer War, was closely involved in training the Territorial Force, and was killed in action whilst leading an infantry brigade in action in May 1915 during the Great War.

== Early life ==
George Colborne was born on 22 February 1864, the eldest son of Sir Edmund Charles Nugent, 3rd Baronet of Waddesdon (1839–1928) and his wife Evelyn Henrietta Gascoigne. He was educated at Eton.

== Early military career ==
Nugent was initially commissioned as a subaltern, with the rank of lieutenant, into the 3rd (1st Norfolk Militia) Battalion, Norfolk Regiment (later the Royal Norfolk Regiment), in October 1881. He resigned his commission, however, in February 1884 and then entered the Royal Military College at Sandhurst. and on passing out in February 1885 was commissioned as a lieutenant into the Grenadier Guards.

Promoted to captain in May 1897, Nugent served with the 3rd Battalion, Grenadier Guards, at Gibraltar before being appointed aide-de-camp to Brigadier General Sir Henry Colville, commanding the infantry brigade at Gibraltar, in March 1899.

== Second Boer War ==
In October 1899 Nugent and his brigadier were transferred to Cape Colony as part of the troop build-up for the Second Boer War, which began that month. Colville took command of the 1st (Guards) Brigade in Major General Lord Methuen's 1st Division, with Nugent as his aide-de-camp.

Advancing to relieve Kimberley at the beginning of the war, Methuen attempted a night attack at Belmont on 22–23 November 1899. He sent Colville off with his brigade to assault Gun Hill; although the attack was a failure, Nugent was mentioned in dispatches for the first time in his military career for his work that night. He distinguished himself again at the Battle of Modder River and was present at the Battle of Magersfontein.

When Colville was promoted to command the 9th Division, Nugent went with him and served at the battles of Poplar Grove and Driefontein. However, in May 1900, while Field Marshal Lord Roberts was closing in on Johannesburg, a Yeomanry battalion under Colville's command was cut off and forced to surrender; Colville was made a scapegoat and sent home. Nugent also returned to the UK, because he had been appointed with the rank of major as one of the first officers of the Irish Guards, newly-forming in London.

== Inter-war years ==
Nugent was made commandant of the School of Instruction for Officers of the Auxiliary Forces. Based at Chelsea Barracks, it provided training for the part-time officers of the Militia, Yeomanry and the Volunteer Force. In May 1908 he was promoted to lieutenant colonel and took command of the 1st Battalion, Irish Guards. As the battalion's commanding officer (CO), Nugent was appointed a Member of the Royal Victorian Order (MVO) by King Edward VII in January 1909.

Nugent became commander of the regiment and the regimental district in July 1909. This brought him the rank of temporary colonel, and also made him ex-officio commander of the 5th London Infantry Brigade, in the Territorial Force (TF), newly formed from the Volunteer Force. The brigade comprised four battalions (17th–20th) of the London Regiment and formed part of the 2nd London Division.

He was promoted to substantive colonel in December 1911 and on completion of his four-year term commanding the district and brigade, Nugent was appointed commandant of the Duke of York's Royal Military School at Dover, Kent, in July 1913.

== First World War ==
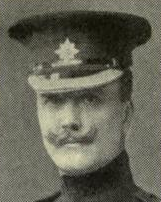
Nugent presumably during the First World War.

Nugent was still commandant when the First World War broke out in August 1914. When Colonel Charles FitzClarence (who had succeeded him in command of the Irish Guards' regimental district and the 5th London Brigade) was transferred to command the 1st (Guards) Brigade in the British Expeditionary Force (BEF), Nugent was brought back to command the 5th London Brigade. He was promoted to the temporary rank of brigadier general on 24 September.

In October, the 2nd London Division was selected for service on the Western Front, where the BEF under Field Marshal Sir John French was engaged in heavy fighting, and progressive training was carried out through the winter. Nugent's brigade was the leading element of the division to land in France on 9 and 10 March 1915. In May the division (already known in France simply as 'The London Division' to distinguish it from the Regular Army's 2nd Division) took its place in the line and was designated the 47th (1/2nd London) Division, with the brigades numbered consecutively: Nugent's 5th London became the 141st (1/5th London) Brigade.

The 47th Division took part in fighting at the battles of Aubers Ridge (9 May) and Festubert (15–25 May), but the 141st Brigade was only marginally involved. During a quiet period of trench-holding, Nugent was killed by a stray bullet on 31 May, "in "Sidbury" Trench near Point Fixe. He was buried at 5.30 pm. in Béthune Cemetery. Major-Gen Munro, Gen Sergeant, Maj-Gen Barter and representatives of units were present at the funeral". A company of the 24th Battalion, London Regiment "in the Béthune area acted as escort. The Buglers of the 6th London Field Ambulance sounded the Last Post".

== Family life ==
Nugent married Isabel Bulwer, daughter of General Sir Edward Gascoigne Bulwer in 1891. She died in 1941 They had two sons:

- George Nugent, born 5 November 1892, Captain and Adjutant of 3rd Bn Grenadier Guards in the First World War, succeeded his grandfather as the 4th Baronet in 1928 and died in 1970.
- Terence Edmund Gascoigne Nugent, Lieutenant, Irish Guards in 1915, later Lt-Col, created Baron Nugent in 1960. In 1935 he married Rosalie Heathcote-Drummond-Willoughy, daughter of Brig.-Gen Charles Strathavon Heathcote-Drummond-Willoughby, who had commanded 6th London Bde alongside Nugent's brigade in 2nd London Division.

== See also ==
- List of generals of the British Empire who died during the First World War

== External sources ==
- London Gazette.
- The Sandhurst Collection.
- Anglo-Boer War.com
