= MI11 =

Department of British military intelligence (historical)

MI11, or Military Intelligence, Section 11, was a department of the British Directorate of Military Intelligence, part of the War Office.

During the Second World War, MI11 was responsible for field security: protecting British military personnel from enemy agents and "fifth columnists" amongst civilian populations, in theatres of war. As such, MI11 assumed a role formerly assigned to the Field Security Police.

Section 11 was absorbed into the Intelligence Corps after the Second World War.
