= Battle of Bazentin Ridge =

Part of the Battle of the Somme during World War I

- Part of the Battle of the Somme of the First World War
- Map of the Battle of the Somme, 1916
Date	14–17 July 1916
Location	Somme, Picardy, France 50°1′38.8″N 2°45′15″E
Result	British victory

Belligerents
British Empire; United Kingdom; India; South Africa	German Empire

Commanders and leaders
(United Kingdom of Great Britain and Ireland) Henry Rawlinson	(German Empire) Fritz von Below

Strength
5 divisions	3 divisions

Casualties and losses
9,194	2,300 and 1,400 prisoners (see Casualties section)
- Bazentin is a commune in the Somme department, Picardy, northern France

The Battle of Bazentin Ridge (14–17 July 1916) was part of the Battle of the Somme (1 July – 18 November) on the Western Front in France, during the First World War. On 14 July, the British Fourth Army (General Henry Rawlinson) made a dawn attack against the German 2nd Army (General Fritz von Below) in the Brown Position (Braune Stellung), from Delville Wood westwards to Bazentin le Petit Wood.

The British attack succeeded but attempts to use the opportunity to capture High Wood failed, due to the German success in holding on to the north end of Longueval and parts of Delville Wood, from which attacks on High Wood could be engaged from the flank. The British cavalry, intended to provide a faster-moving exploitation force, was badly delayed by the devastated ground, shell-holes and derelict trenches.

In the afternoon, infantry of the British 7th Division attacked High Wood, when an earlier advance could have occupied the wood unopposed. The British found German troops in parts of the wood and in the Switch Line along the ridge, which cut through the north-east part of the wood. British cavalry eventually attacked east of the wood and overran German infantry hiding in standing crops, inflicting about 100 casualties for a loss of eight troopers.

The cavalry attack was supported by an artillery-observation aircraft, whose crew saw the Germans in the crops and fired at them with their Lewis gun. The British struggled to exploit the success and the 2nd Army recovered, leading to another period of attritional line straightening attacks and German counter-attacks before the British and French could resume general attacks in mid-September.

== Background ==
=== Strategic developments ===
By mid-June, the certainty of an Anglo-French attack on the Somme against the 2nd Army (General der Infanterie Fritz von Below), had led General Erich von Falkenhayn, the Chief of the Großer Generalstab (German General Staff), to send four divisions and artillery reinforcements from the Oberste Heeresleitung (OHL, Supreme Army Command) reserve, enough to contain the British offensive. The 2nd Army had plenty of time to construct a defence in depth and was better prepared than at any time since trench warfare had begun to receive an attack by the British and the French. On 15 June, Falkenhayn had informed the 6th Army (Generaloberst Rupprecht, Crown Prince of Bavaria) that the main Entente attack would be against the 2nd Army, with a limited attack near Lens on the 6th Army, which had a shorter line to hold, with 17 1/2 divisions, plenty of heavy artillery and with three divisions of the OHL reserve close by.

Maintaining the strength of the 6th Army at the expense of the 2nd Army on the Somme was to conserve the means for a counter-offensive north of the Somme front, once the British offensive had been shattered by the 2nd Army. A German attack on Fleury at Verdun from 22 to 23 June succeeded and on 24 June, the Verdun offensive was limited, to conserve manpower and ammunition for the coming Entente offensive, except for preparations to attack Fort Souville in July, to gain control of the heights on the east bank of the Meuse, overlooking Verdun. The fort was the last significant French position on the east bank and the final objective of the offensive that had begun in February 1916, which had been intended to last only a few weeks.

The power of the Anglo-French offensive on the Somme surprised the Germans, despite the costly failure of the British attack on 1 July, north of the Albert–Bapaume road. The quantity of Entente artillery-fire caused many casualties and much of the 2nd Army artillery, vital to the defensive system, had been destroyed. The policy of meeting any Anglo-French success with an immediate counter-attack was also costly and in the first ten days, the Germans suffered 40,187 casualties, against 25,989 in the first ten days at Verdun. After a lull on the Eastern Front, the Russians had resumed the Brusilov Offensive in June and forced Falkenhayn to reorganise the Eastern front, send German divisions to bolster the Austro-Hungarians and make limited counter-attacks, that had little effect. In late June and early July the Russians inflicted more defeats and on 2 July attacked the German sector of the Eastern Front at Baranovitchi.

On 2 July, seven divisions had been sent from OHL reserve and from the 6th Army to the 2nd Army; another seven were en route by 9 July. On 7 July, Falkenhayn abandoned the plan for a counter-offensive by the 6th Army for lack of manpower. After the failure of the attack on Fort Souville at Verdun on 12 July, Falkenhayn ordered a "strict defensive" and the transfer of more troops and artillery to the Somme, the first visible strategic effect of the Anglo-French offensive. Falkenhayn adopted a strategy of defeating the offensive on the Somme to show the French that the German army could not be beaten and that a negotiated peace was inevitable. German casualties were so high that by mid-July Falkenhayn had sent the best divisions remaining in the 6th Army to the Somme, reduced the OHL reserve to one division and begun reducing the size of the divisions in the Westheer (Western Army), to allow complete divisions to be transferred to the Somme; the Entente had seized the initiative on the Western Front.

=== Tactical developments ===
Bassin de la Somme

On 1 July, the French Sixth Army and the right wing of the British Fourth Army had inflicted a considerable defeat on the German 2nd Army. From the Albert–Bapaume road north to Gommecourt, the Fourth Army attack had been a disaster, where most of the c. 57,000 British casualties were suffered. Against the wishes of Marshal Joseph Joffre, General Sir Douglas Haig abandoned the offensive north of the road to reinforce the success in the south. During the Battle of Albert (1–13 July), the Fourth Army pressed forward south of the road, through several intermediate defensive lines, towards the German second position. The attacks were hampered by supply routes becoming quagmires during rainy periods (lengthening the time for round trips), behind the French XX Corps (Général Maurice Balfourier) and the British XIII Corps (Lieutenant-General Walter Congreve), XV Corps (Lieutenant-General Sir Henry Horne) and III Corps (Lieutenant-General William Pulteney). (Note: Fourth Army: the 2nd Indian Cavalry Division, III Corps: 1st, 23rd and 34th divisions, XIII Corps: 3rd, 9th and 18th divisions, XV Corps: 7th, 21st and 33rd divisions. Reserve Army, X Corps: 25th, 48th and 49th divisions.)

South of the Albert–Bapaume road, La Boisselle was captured on 4 July, Bernafay and Caterpillar woods were occupied from 3 to 4 July and fighting for Trônes Wood, Mametz Wood and Contalmaison took place until early on 14 July. The Germans opposite the Fourth Army were kept disorganised and the British closed to within striking distance of the German second position, a significant but costly victory. The Fourth Army attacks were not co-ordinated, tactically crude, wasteful of manpower and gave the Germans an opportunity to concentrate their inferior resources on narrow fronts, multiplying their effect. The loss of c. 57,000 British casualties on 1 July was not repeated. From 2 to 13 July, the British attacked 46 times and suffered c. 25,000 casualties, a change in the rate of loss from 57,000 to 2,083 per day. Around 14 July, Général Émile Fayolle wrote that the French had taken 12,000 prisoners and 70 guns, the British 7,500 prisoners and 24 guns but that the British had 70,000 men "in the ground" (sic) and were still short of the German second position.

The strain imposed by the Entente attacks after 1 July, led Below to issue an order of the day (2nd Army Order I a 575 secret) on 3 July, forbidding voluntary withdrawals,

The outcome of the war depends on 2nd Army being victorious on the Somme. Despite the current enemy superiority in artillery and infantry we have got to win this battle.... For the time being, we must hold our current positions without fail and improve on them by means of minor counter-attacks. I forbid the voluntary relinquishment of positions.... The enemy must be made to pick his way forward over corpses.

— 3 July 1916

after Falkenhayn sacked the Chief of Staff of the 2nd Army, Generalmajor Paul Grünert and General Günther von Pannewitz the XVII Corps commander, defending the south side of the Somme, after Grünert had allowed Pannewitz to withdraw to the third position where the Somme flows south to north, to shorten the corps front; Grünert was replaced by Colonel Fritz von Loßberg. First-class German reinforcements reaching the Somme front were thrown into the battle piecemeal, which caused them higher casualties. German attacks were poorly organised, insufficient time was allowed for reconnaissance and the infantry was inadequately supported by the artillery, which sometimes fired on German troops. German counter-attacks were even less well-organised than their British equivalents and most failed.

== Prelude ==
=== German preparations ===
The Germans defending the Braune Stellung (second position), which had few deep dugouts, suffered many casualties on 7 July. British artillery was directed by artillery-observation aircraft and a battalion of Reserve Infantry Regiment 122 (RIR 122) suffered 243 casualties. British artillery-fire cut communications and the XIV Reserve Corps (Generalleutnant Hermann von Stein) lost touch with the front line, not knowing if it still existed from Contalmaison to Pozières. A counter-attack by RIR 122 and Infantry Regiment 183 (IR 183) was postponed and lack of information led to the attack being cancelled next day. The commander of the 185th Division, which contained a motley of units from four divisions, was put in charge of the line from the south of Mametz Wood to Ovillers, to fill the gap from Contalmaison to Pozières by dawn on 9 July. I Battalion, RIR 122 relieved I Battalion, Lehr Regiment, which had suffered 618 casualties in Contalmaison from the constant British artillery-fire, its troops having had to lie in mud, among the sick, wounded and dead. The battalions in the area received about 100 recruits each as reinforcements and RIR 77 arrived from the 2nd Guard Reserve Division. The IV Corps (General Friedrich Sixt von Armin) with the 7th Division (Major-General Friedrich von Bernhardi) and the 8th Division (Ernst II, Duke of Saxe-Altenburg) was en route for the Somme.

From 6 to 13 July, 63 heavy artillery batteries, three artillery flights, two reconnaissance flights and a bombing flight of Die Fliegertruppen (Imperial German Air Service) arrived and Below asked for more machine-gun units, on which the defence was being based. On 12 July, Falkenhayn ordered the 5th Army at Verdun to assume a "strict defensive", ordered artillery to the Somme and urged Below to hold on to the area of Hardecourt to Trônes Wood, to counter French or British attacks from the flank, if it became possible to deliver an organised counter-attack. Below wanted to attack south of the Somme, where artillery-fire could be concentrated but needed five fresh divisions, which did not exist and next day all counter-attacks were cancelled. Such confusion had been created by the arrival of units milked from divisions beyond the Somme, that the battlefield was divided into permanent corps areas, the corps headquarters, heavy artillery and supply services to remain as a permanent administrative organisation. Brigades and divisions were to be transferred in and out, with the group maintaining the command arrangements and continuity of policy. On 13 July, the 2nd Army created Gruppe Gossler (the HQ of the (VI Reserve Corps)) from the Somme to Hardecourt, Gruppe Sixt von Armin (IV Corps), Hardecourt to Pozières and Gruppe Stein (XIV Reserve Corps) from Pozières across the Ancre to Gommecourt. (Note: Gruppe Gossler: 123rd, 12th Reserve (part) and 11th Reserve divisions, Gruppe Sixt von Armin: Division Burckhardt, 183rd and 3rd Guard divisions, Gruppe Stein: 2nd Guard Reserve, 52nd (Lieutenant-General Karl von Borries) and 26th Reserve divisions. IR 183 had suffered 1,577 casualties, the Guard Fusilier Regiment 1,218 casualties and from 4 to 16 July, Grenadier Regiment 9 (GR 9) suffered 1,185 casualties among its 2,832 men.)

=== British plan ===
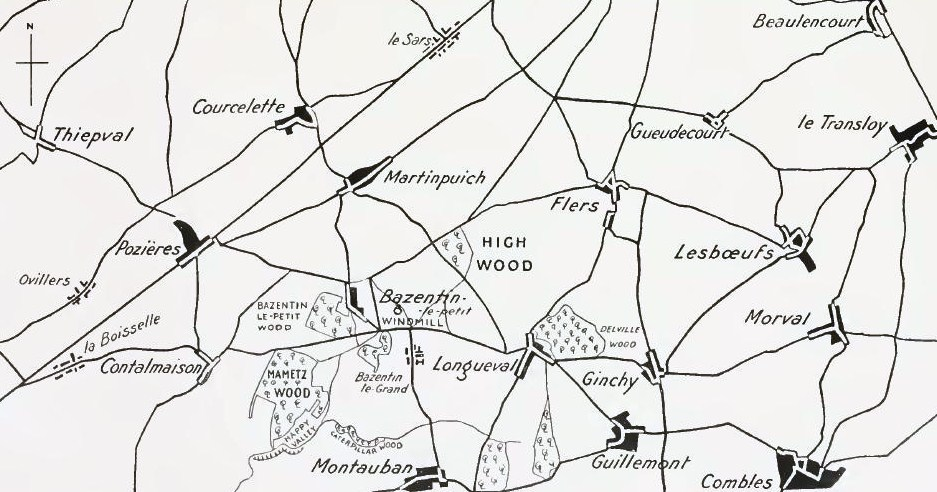
Bazentin Ridge, July 1916

Before the Fourth Army had captured Trônes Wood, Mametz Wood and Contalmaison, Rawlinson issued a warning order for an attack on the German second position; engineers and pioneers began to clear roads and fill in derelict trenches. Guns and ammunition were moved forward and the Royal Flying Corps (RFC) photographed the German second and third positions. With the corps commanders and artillery commanders, Rawlinson decided that the attack should begin at dawn, when there would be insufficient light for German machine-gunners to see far ahead. XIII Corps was to attack with two divisions from Longueval to Bazentin-le-Grand, after forming up in no man's land, 500 yd (460 m) short of the German trenches. XV Corps was to attack from the north edge of Mametz Wood, on a front from Bazentin le Grand wood to Bazentin le Petit village and its cemetery, where no man's land was much narrower. The 1st Division of III Corps was to attack further west as a flank guard.

The XIII Corps infantry on the right would have to cross up to 1,200 yd (1,100 m) of no man's land in the dark and assemble close to the Braune Stellung (second position), the front line since the Entente advances after 1 July. If the Germans detected the move across no man's land, the attack could be a disaster but Rawlinson and the corps commanders felt that the risk was warranted. Night attacks had already been tried and one by the 12th (Eastern) Division on the night of 3/4 July had failed after German machine-gunners saw the infantry, who were then stopped by uncut wire. Haig was dubious about the scheme, because the British infantry were not trained or disciplined enough and because staff officers were too inexperienced to organise a 0.5 mi (0.80 km) night move, assembly and attack. Haig wanted XV Corps to attack first from Mametz Wood, where no man's land was much narrower. The right flank would take the spur near Marlboro' Wood, with III Corps guarding the left flank, by an advance of the 1st Division up Pearl Alley, to capture Contalmaison Villa. XV Corps could then face east and XIII Corps would attack from the south at dawn, towards Waterlot Farm, Longueval and Bazentin le Grand.

On 11 July, Rawlinson met again with the corps and divisional commanders, who wanted the original plan reinstated. Haig compromised with a scheme in which XV Corps, with reinforcements, would still attack first but XIII Corps would dig positions on the south slopes of the ridge from Longueval to Bazentin and send patrols forward, ready to attack, if it were feasible, to assist the XV Corps attack against both Bazentin woods and Bazentin le Petit. XV Corps would wheel east to roll up the defences opposite XIII Corps, which would then attack. Rawlinson contacted Haig again on 12 July and his Major-General General Staff (MGGS) Archibald Montgomery, contacted Launcelot Kiggell the BEF Chief of the General Staff, to make a final appeal. Haig gave way, provided that the supporting points were built by XIII Corps and the flanks were protected by garrisons in Mametz and Trônes woods. Most of Mametz Wood had already been captured and the fight for Trônes Wood continued. Haig was also reassured by Major-General Noel Birch the BEF Major-General Royal Artillery (MGRA) that the bombardment was succeeding, that German underground shelters in the second position would be shallower than those overrun on 1 July, that the British had gained artillery superiority and that a dawn attack would mean plenty of time for exploitation.

The 9th (Scottish) Division (Major-General William Furse) and the 3rd Division (Major-General Aylmer Haldane) in XIII Corps were to attack on a line from the north-west corner of Bernafay Wood to Marlboro' Wood and needed to advance 1,200 yd (1,100 m) to a line from Delville Wood to Longueval and Bazentin le Grand in the dark, to close up to the German front line. From Marlboro' Wood to the north side of Mametz Wood, the 7th Division (Major-General Herbert Watts) and 21st Division (Major-General David Campbell) of XV Corps, faced no man's land which was 600–350 yd (550–320 m) wide south of Bazentin le Grand Wood, Bazentin le Petit Wood, village and the cemetery 500 yd (460 m) east. The advance would be uphill except beyond Mametz Wood, where the ground was flat. The 18th (Eastern) Division (Major-General Ivor Maxse) was to set up a defensive flank on the east face of Trônes Wood, between the 9th (Scottish) Division and the French 153rd Division, which would support the 18th (Eastern) Division with artillery if necessary. On the left flank, the 1st Division was to form another defensive flank in the Pearl Alley communication trench and capture Contalmaison Villa, to link with the 21st Division at Bazentin le Petit Wood. (At 10:00 p.m. on 13 July, the 1st Division attacked with the 1st Black Watch and captured Lower Wood, north of the top left of Mametz Wood and Contalmaison Villa at 3:45 a.m. on 14 July.

The 18th (Eastern) Division at Trônes Wood diverted German attention on the east flank and it had been assumed that the French XX Corps would participate in the attack south of Guillemont. The failure of French attacks from 7 to 8 July, led General Ferdinand Foch, (Groupe d'armées du Nord) to order Fayolle to wait on the British attack "For the time being, all the French effort will be concentrated south of the river". (Pour le moment tout l'effort français va se concentrer au sud de la rivière) and only artillery support was made available. Three cavalry divisions were to be ready by 4:00 a.m. to exploit success, the 2nd Indian Cavalry Division (Major-General Henry Macandrew) by capturing High Wood 2,000 yd (1,800 m) north-west of Longueval, the 1st Cavalry Division (Major-General Cecil Bingham) Leuze Wood, 1,000 yd (910 m) beyond Guillemont and the 3rd Cavalry Division (Major-General John Vaughan) to capture Martinpuich. The 2nd Indian Cavalry Division was placed under the command of XIII Corps and the other two divisions remained under the Fourth Army HQ, for Rawlinson to decide when they were to attack, according to reports from the corps and from air reconnaissance.

=== Offensive preparations ===
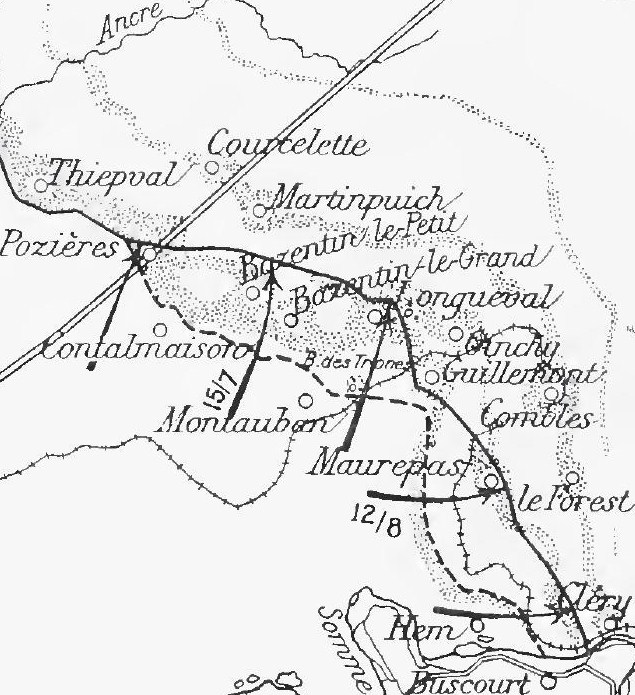
Outline of Franco-British advances on the Somme, July–August 1916

A preliminary bombardment began on 11 July, with counter-battery fire and shelling of the attack front. The fire of the three corps continued at night on villages and woods further back and approach routes from them to the front line, especially Waterlot Farm, Flers, High Wood, Martinpuich, Le Sars and Bapaume. A shortage of heavy artillery ammunition and transport difficulties over wet and cut up ground, led to a ration of twenty-five 15-inch howitzer, fifty 9.2-inch howitzer, a hundred and ten 8-inch howitzer and two hundred and fifty 6-inch howitzer shells per day, for two days. The field artillery was moved forward to the south side of Montauban Ridge and 2,000 rounds was dumped per field gun. Anglo−French air supremacy made it impossible for the German air units to reconnoitre behind the British lines and the supply of ammunition continued round the clock, easing the effect of rain, which extended wagon journeys to 5 to 6 hour round trips. Late on 11 June, Horne reported that the wire-cutting would take until 14 July and Rawlinson set that day for the attack, allotting more ammunition for the extra day's bombardment.

Few German shells fell on British field artillery positions, most of which were in the open and dumps of stores were left in Caterpillar Valley at night, covered by a line of outposts and left during the day without protection. The lack of German air observation made the dumps secure and artillery inferiority led the Germans to reserve most of their artillery-fire to the moments just before an attack and the firing defensive barrages. The attacking divisions continued their preparations on the assumption that the original plan would be agreed and Rawlinson considered that the plans of the 9th (Scottish) Division and the 3rd Division for the night approach were satisfactory. For surprise, the infantry were to be preceded by only a five-minute hurricane bombardment from all the XIII Corps and XV Corps guns, rather than the usual thirty-minute bombardment, to which the Germans had become accustomed. To avoid premature shell-bursts in the creeping barrage caused by trees and buildings, only delay fuzed, high-explosive shell was to be fired from the 18-pounder field guns, the 4.5-inch howitzers and medium howitzers. (Note: Rawlinson had 950 field gun and howitzers, two-thirds of the artillery strength for a 22,000 yd (13 mi; 20 km) front and 300,000 yd (170 mi; 270 km) of trench lines on 1 July, for a 6,000 yd (3.4 mi; 5.5 km) front and 12,000 yd (6.8 mi; 11 km) of trench line on 14 July, only 5 per cent of the ground, a fivefold increase in shells per yard.)

==== Trônes Wood ====
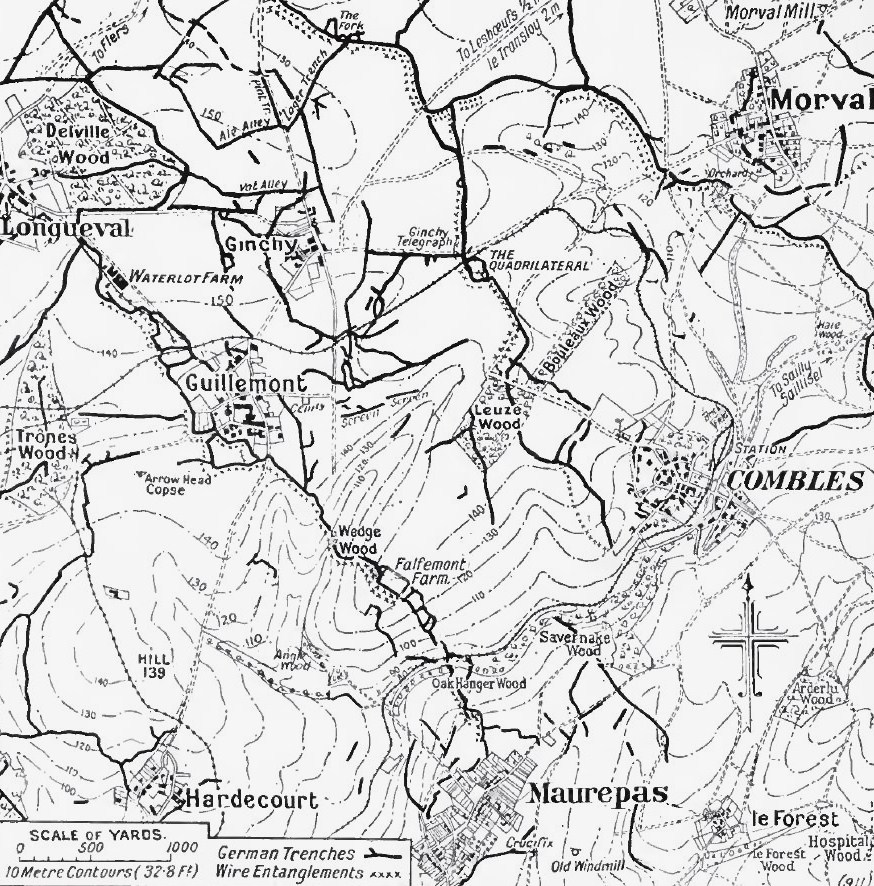
Terrain eastwards from Trônes Wood, 1916

British attacks on Trônes Wood had begun on 8 July and counter-attacks and attacks continued inconclusively. Just after midnight on 13/14 July, the 54th Brigade assembled for another night attack, with no time for reconnaissance. The advance was to be from south to north and the two nearest battalions were chosen. At 4:30 a.m., the leading battalion crossed 1,000 yd (910 m) of open ground through a barrage in artillery formation to the south-west of the wood. A redoubt in Central Trench was enveloped and rushed at 6:00 a.m., then the advance reached the eastern edge, which was mistaken for the north end of the wood. A defensive flank was formed from the railway line south to the strong point at Trônes Alley.

The second battalion entered the wood at 8:00 a.m., finding parties from many units in the south-east corner; searches to the north found little sign of the first battalion. A company attacked the strong point, with another attack by the troops in Maltz Horn Trench. Direction was maintained by compass and frequent halts, the troops firing into the undergrowth as they advanced. The south end of Central Trench was rolled up and the British reached the real north end at 9:30 a.m. German troops, pushed north, tried to retreat to Guillemont and suffered many casualties to small-arms fire from the defensive flank. Consolidation began by linking a line of shell-holes beyond the eastern fringe of the wood. (Note: Reserve Infantry Regiment 107 was ordered to retake Trônes Wood and at Guillemont to dig in from the village past the east end of Delville Wood. The signs of a German counter-attack were seen in the afternoon and a British bombardment of the east side of the wood continued into the night but no attack came, the German second line having been made the main line of defence.)

==== Night assembly ====
Six brigades with 22,000 infantry and supporting troops, had to assemble closer than 500 yd (460 m) to the Germans, at night, without being noticed. On 13 July, the British discovered that the Germans were eavesdropping on the field telephones of the 62nd Brigade (Brigadier-General George Gater); as a ruse, a call was made that operations had been postponed. In the 9th (Scottish) Division area, the 26th Brigade (Brigadier-General Archibald Ritchie) and the 27th Brigade (Brigadier-General Spencer Scrase-Dickens) were to lead the attack, with the 1st South African Brigade (Brigadier-General Henry Lukin) in reserve. The 26th Brigade was to assemble on the north slope of Caterpillar Valley, with the left flank on the Montauban–Longueval road, covered by machine-gun posts on the right. The two attacking battalions were to be screened 200–300 yd (180–270 m) from the German lines, on the crest of a ridge south of Longueval, by four platoons with Lewis guns. The screening force went forward on the night of 13/14 July to a line of shell-holes made for them by 6-inch howitzers. The screening platoons were followed by three officers and 24 markers from each battalion, to the parallel Bernafay Wood–Longueval and the Montauban–Longueval roads, which were the left flank positions of the battalions.

Each battalion was to form up in columns of two companies and each company in column of platoons, in single rank at 70 yd (64 m) intervals, to make eight infantry lines. The markers stopped in threes 70 yd (64 m) apart and two then moved right at 90°, laying two 150 yd (140 m) tapes in succession to mark the front of the platoon waves. (Note: Engineer tape was a 1 in (25 mm) white canvas strand 50 yd (46 m) long.) The battalions moved forward by companies, in single-file, over the road running south of Bernafay Wood to Montauban at 12:25 a.m. and up the roads to the left markers; the platoons arrived and turned right along the tape. A section of the 26th Mortar Battery and sections of the 26th Machine Gun Company followed each battalion and the 26th Brigade assembly was complete by 3:00 a.m. Two machine-gun sections stayed with the support battalion in Montauban Alley and the rest of the guns and mortars waited with the reserve battalion, south of Montauban. There was unusually little German artillery-fire on Caterpillar Valley and the brigade lost seven casualties.

There were no roads for the 27th Brigade to use so the 76th Brigade plan was adopted. A platoon covering force went forward at 11:00 p.m. and an engineer tape 1,000 yd (910 m) long was used as a line, laid on a compass bearing by a party of Royal Engineers, the end being 400 yd (370 m) short of the German front line, which took 45 minutes. Tapes were laid at right angles, checked and then the markers went forward. The brigade passed the west end of Montauban in column and formed up at near end of the tape in Caterpillar Valley. The two attacking battalions went first with the companies in line, in column of platoons in one rank, the support battalion behind with a field engineer company and pioneer company on either side. At 1:45 a.m., the first battalion moved off followed by the second at 2:10 a.m. and then both formed platoons in open column at 70 yd (64 m) spaces, to form the eight infantry lines, with trench mortars, machine-guns and carrying parties to the rear, suffering five casualties during the deployment.

In XV Corps, the 3rd Division had put out an outpost line for several nights along a sunken road, parallel to and 250 yd (230 m) from the German front line, 1,000 yd (910 m) beyond the British front line. The division patrolled vigorously, dominating no man's land but could not prevent the Germans working on the wire, which was in long grass and difficult to see. On the nights of 11/12 and 12/13 July, three communication trenches were dug forward into Caterpillar Valley; a derelict trench about 200 yd (180 m) from the German line was repaired and deepened behind a piquet established at 10:30 p.m. on the night of 13/14 July. The 8th Brigade (Brigadier-General E. G. Williams) and the 9th Brigade (Brigadier-General Herbert Potter) deployed in lines of platoons, also using a long tape. The leading battalions moved up to the sunken road at 12:25 a.m. and were ready at 1:45 a.m., the first wave beyond the road, machine-guns, mortars, engineers and pioneers in support and reserve, with only one casualty; earlier, three German deserters had disclosed that no attack was expected.

The 7th Division was brought back after only five days' rest, with no time to assimilate large numbers of replacements. (Note: The 20th Brigade, to lead the attack, received a draft of 1,400 men as it moved forward.) In the afternoon of 13 July, a battalion of the 20th Brigade (Brigadier-General Cyril Deverell) moved forward under local initiative and captured the Hammerhead early. Outposts went forward at 10:30 p.m. and the two attacking battalions were led forward in single-file, up communication trenches and over ground strewn with wire and abandoned trenches, through two infantry companies, which then drew back into reserve. The jumping-off line was a bank with low trees marked by tape, with a bush on the right flank. Flat Iron Copse was on the left, 500 yd (460 m) from the German line and closer to a salient called The Snout, which had been bombarded by heavy trench mortars and appeared empty. Stokes mortars went forward but machine-guns were to wait until they could go straight through to the furthest objective. The brigade was ready by 2:00 a.m., telephones still worked and few casualties had been suffered.

The 22nd Brigade (Brigadier-General Julian Steele) assembled in Mametz Wood, the right-hand battalion with an extra company and a Stokes mortar, making its way up the right side of the wood. The left-hand battalion and the support battalion used the bed of a light railway and the 110th Machine-Gun Company moved out to cover the left flank. By 2:35 a.m. the assembly into four lines along tapes was complete but the right hand battalion could only hide one line and the left-hand battalion three lines in Mametz Wood, because of fallen trees and debris. The six brigades had managed to assemble 400–500 yd (370–460 m) short of the German line with a trifling number of casualties, the covering parties encountering no small-arms fire, flares or patrols. The troops began to creep forward, the 8th Brigade at 2:00 a.m. at 20 yd (18 m) per minute, closing to 120 yd (110 m) by 3:15 a.m. The 9th Brigade was only 50 yd (46 m) short when the hurricane bombardment began; the other brigades waited for the bombardment and then crawled forward as far as possible.

== Battle ==
=== Reserve Army ===
During the night of 13/14 July, the Reserve Army (Lieutenant-General Hubert Gough) divisions of X Corps (Lieutenant-General Thomas Morland), either side of the Albert–Bapaume road, continued attacks at Ovillers. The 3rd Worcestershire, 7th Brigade, 25th Division (Major-General Guy Bainbridge moved up a trench across the road to try to close in from the north-east. From the south-east, the 10th Cheshire (7th Brigade) was repulsed but the 8th Border (75th Brigade) on the left managed a small advance and the 1st Dorset, 14th Brigade, 32nd Division (Major-General William Rycroft) also managed to get forward on the west side. To the north-west, battalions of the 96th and 97th brigades of the division, attacked with hand-grenades and took a small amount of ground and the 49th (West Riding) Division (Major-General Edward Perceval, attacked at the Leipzig Salient. At 3:00 a.m., just before the Fourth Army attacked, the 4th Division and the 48th (South Midland) Division (Robert Fanshawe), in VIII Corps (Lieutenant-General Aylmer Hunter-Weston) north of the Ancre, made a smoke-screen and fired a bombardment beyond the 4th Division front, from 2:25–3:30 a.m. as a diversion and succeeded in simulating an attack.

From the positions occupied during the day, an advance from the left side of Bazentin le Petit Wood, along the second position trenches towards Pozières, offered the possibility of an attack from three sides. The 10th Cheshire tried a daylight attack on Ovillers but was repulsed by machine-gun fire and the 1/7th Royal Warwick [48th (South Midland) Division], tried to exploit the success of the 3rd Worcester but failed. The Cheshire attacked again at 11:00 p.m. and captured the objective but suffered so many casualties that they had to withdraw. At 2:00 a.m. on 15 July, the 25th Division attacked Ovillers again, this time from the north-east, east and south, with the 32nd Division attacking from the south-west but the garrison repulsed the attack. German attacks on the Leipzig Salient were defeated and during the night, the 32nd Division was relieved by 144th Brigade of the 48th (South Midland) Division. At 1:00 a.m. on 16 July, the 143rd Brigade (under the command of the 25th Division) attacked from the north-east, the 74th Brigade of the 25th Division and the 144th Brigade attacked from the east and south. During the evening the last Germans in the village surrendered and 128 men of II Battalion, RIR 15 and the Guard Fusilier Regiment were taken prisoner. The 145th Brigade, 48th (South Midland) Division took over and another 300 yd (270 m) of trench was captured on 17 July.

=== Fourth Army ===
==== 14 July ====
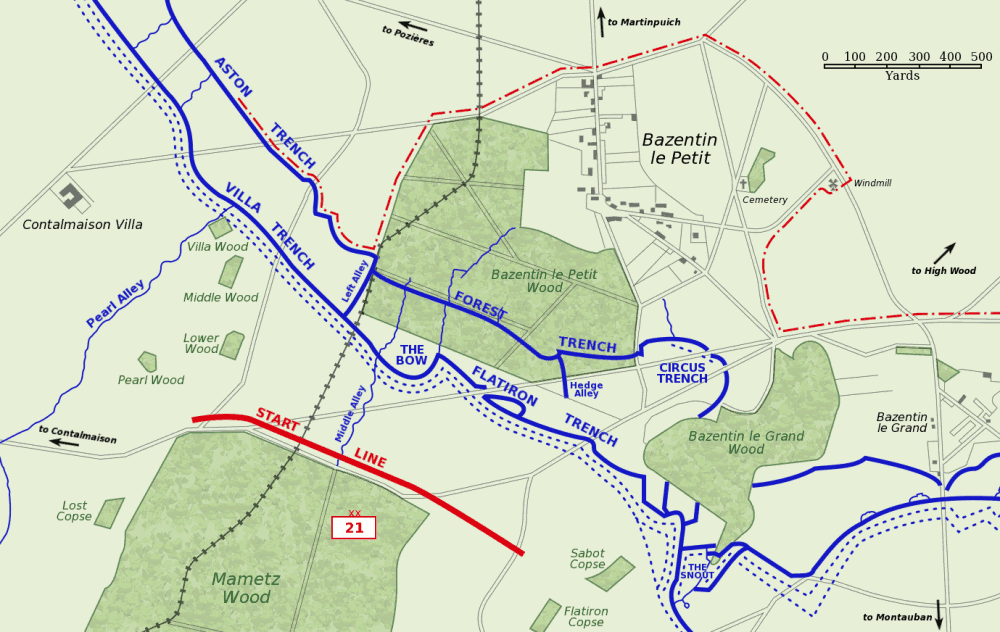
Map of the Braune Stellung (second position) facing the British 21st Division near Bazentin le Petit, 14 July 1916. [Start line, red; objective, dashed red.]

At 3:20 a.m., the sky lit up behind the attacking divisions and a hurricane bombardment, supplemented by machine-guns firing on fixed lines, fell on the German positions. At 3:25 a.m. the leading British infantry stood up and moved forwards through a mist, with just enough light to recognise German troops. The German infantry were surprised by the intensity and brevity of the bombardment and the rapid onset of the British infantry behind a creeping barrage of high-explosive shells. The II Battalion, Bavarian Infantry Regiment 16 in Longueval had been alerted and sent out four patrols; one disappeared, one ran into a British patrol and two returned with nothing to report. The first wave reached the German wire without a shot and passed over the front line, some of the following waves becoming engaged by Germans who emerged from underground shelters. A German counter-barrage began and fell into Caterpillar Valley, well behind the infantry.

On the right flank, the 26th and 27th brigades got across two belts of barbed wire, cutting by hand in places but the 10th Argyll were held up until the left flank company broke through and rolled up the German defenders. All four battalions crossed two trench lines, except for a short delay at the south end of Longueval, where the Germans were also rolled up from the flank. The infantry kept going and the support battalions arrived to consolidate. The Germans in Longueval made a determined defence but by 10:00 a.m. the 9th Scottish Rifles had taken their objectives, except the north end and a strong point in the south-east of the village, which resisted until attacked with support from the 7th Seaforth and the 5th Cameron Highlanders at 5:00 p.m. It proved impossible to capture Waterlot Farm in the second position so positions were taken in Longueval Alley, in touch with the 18th (Eastern) Division. At 9:00 a.m., the 9th (Scottish) Division HQ was erroneously informed that the village had been captured but by then the occupied part of the village had been consolidated; a source of water was found before the Germans could counter-attack.

On the 3rd Division front, the 8th Brigade found much uncut wire in the first belt and the second untouched. A Company broke through on the left and bombed down the German front trench and the troops held up cut their way through or climbed over the wire to rush the trenches. On the 9th Brigade front on the left, the wire was on a forward slope and had been well cut. The British rushed the German trenches, where a sentry of I Battalion, Bavarian Regiment 16 had spotted the British at 2:00 a.m. and alerted the battalion. The troops breasted the ridge through machine-gun fire from Bazentin le Grand, captured the trenches and brought up trench mortars against the village; the 1st Northumberland Fusiliers passed through and captured the village. In the 7th Division area, the 20th Brigade captured the German trenches as soon as the bombardment lifted, finding the wire and trenches destroyed and the Germans in The Snout dead. The troops moved towards the second line and rushed it when the barrage lifted at 3:35 a.m. German troops retreating towards High Wood were shot down with small-arms fire.

The 20th Brigade waited for the barrage to lift off Bazentin le Grand Wood at 4:25 a.m., which was quickly captured and a defensive line established beyond. Consolidation began as the 22nd Brigade passed through and continued the attack with the 2nd Royal Warwick, which covered the 2nd Royal Irish advance on the southern edge of Bazentin le Petit at 6:30 a.m. At 7:30 a.m. the Irish captured the village with help from the 6th Leicester on the left, taking prisoner the HQ staff and over 200 men of Bavarian Infantry Regiment 16. An hour later, a German counter-attack recovered the north end of the village, except for the cemetery to the east. Another attack by the Irish and the 2nd Gordon Highlanders, ejected the Germans; the troops dug in and defeated more counter-attacks.

The first battalions of the 110th Brigade of the 21st Division got into the German trenches quickly except for one point on the left, where German machine-gunners held on for twenty minutes, until enveloped from both flanks. The second line was captured by 4:00 a.m. and contact made with the 1st Division on the left. The infantry pushed on into Bazentin le Petit Wood with little opposition, except at the north-west corner, where a German party resisted all day. A defensive flank was formed facing east to stop the Germans opposite the 7th Division retreating to the west. At about 6:00 a.m. one battalion advanced into Bazentin le Petit, linked with the 2nd Royal Irish and handed over the village, before digging in from the north end of the village to the north-east of the wood. When a German counter-attack pushed back the Royal Irish, the 100th Brigade troops fell back temporarily into the wood. The 7th Division field artillery moved forward and engineers began work to repair tracks across Caterpillar Valley. The Fourth Army had advanced onto the Ginchy–Pozières Ridge and captured 1,442 prisoners, including two regimental headquarters. Many German corpses could be seen but poor musketry had enabled German troops to escape, the British troops lacking the training to hit soldiers beyond 300 yd (270 m).

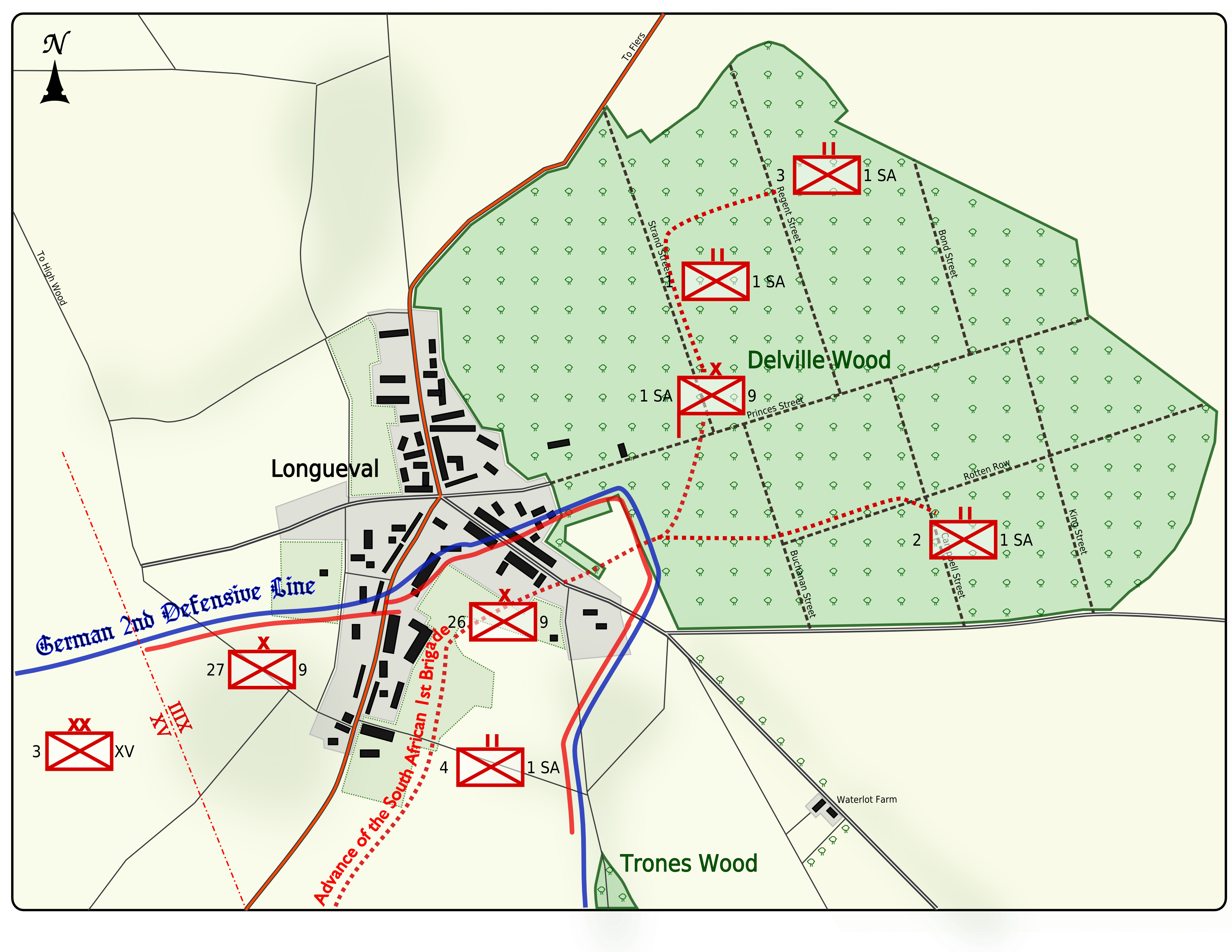
Delville Wood, 14 July

Fighting went on in Longueval and Delville Wood under German bombardment and the 26th and 27th brigades of the 9th (Scottish) Division suffered many casualties. Conflicting reports about the capture of Longueval arrived at XIII Corps HQ and at 4:30 p.m. it became clear that only the south end of the village had been occupied and the 1st South African Regiment was moved up from reserve. The attack at Longueval and Delville Wood had lacked sufficient power to capture all of the wood and village, where II Battalion, BIR 16 was reinforced by II Battalion, IR 26 of the 7th Division and a battalion of RIR 99 during the day. The relative success of the defenders inhibited the British from ordering a bolder exploitation further west. Opposite the 7th and part of the 3rd Division the Germans were found to have disappeared by 10:00 a.m. and some British officers walked up to High Wood unchallenged. Watts suggested sending the 91st Brigade from reserve to occupy the wood but was ordered to wait for the cavalry and Haldane was told to keep his reserve brigade ready to receive counter-attacks.

At 8:50 a.m. Horne ordered the 7th Division to relieve the 2nd Indian Cavalry Division at High Wood as soon as they had captured it and the 21st Division to advance north to capture the ground from Bazentin le Petit to the Martinpuich light railway, to assist the III Corps attack between the 21st Division and Black Watch Alley. The 21st Division and 1st Division were to attack at 2:30 p.m. and the 34th Division was to patrol towards Pozières. The cavalry had been ordered forward from Morlancourt at 7:40 a.m. but found the going very difficult, the ground being wet and cut with trenches and shell-holes. The Secunderabad Cavalry Brigade took until the afternoon to reach Montauban and at 12:15 a.m. Rawlinson ordered the 7th Division to capture High Wood. Horne countermanded the order because of the situation at Longueval and the XIII Corps held back the cavalry, apart from patrols. The attack of the 21st Division and the 1st Division also proved abortive because of the German party in the north-west corner of Bazentin le Petit Wood and increasing German artillery-fire. A German counter-attack at 3:00 p.m. reduced the infantry of the 62nd Brigade to 1,200 men and made the rest of the 21st Division incapable of attacking.

==== High Wood ====
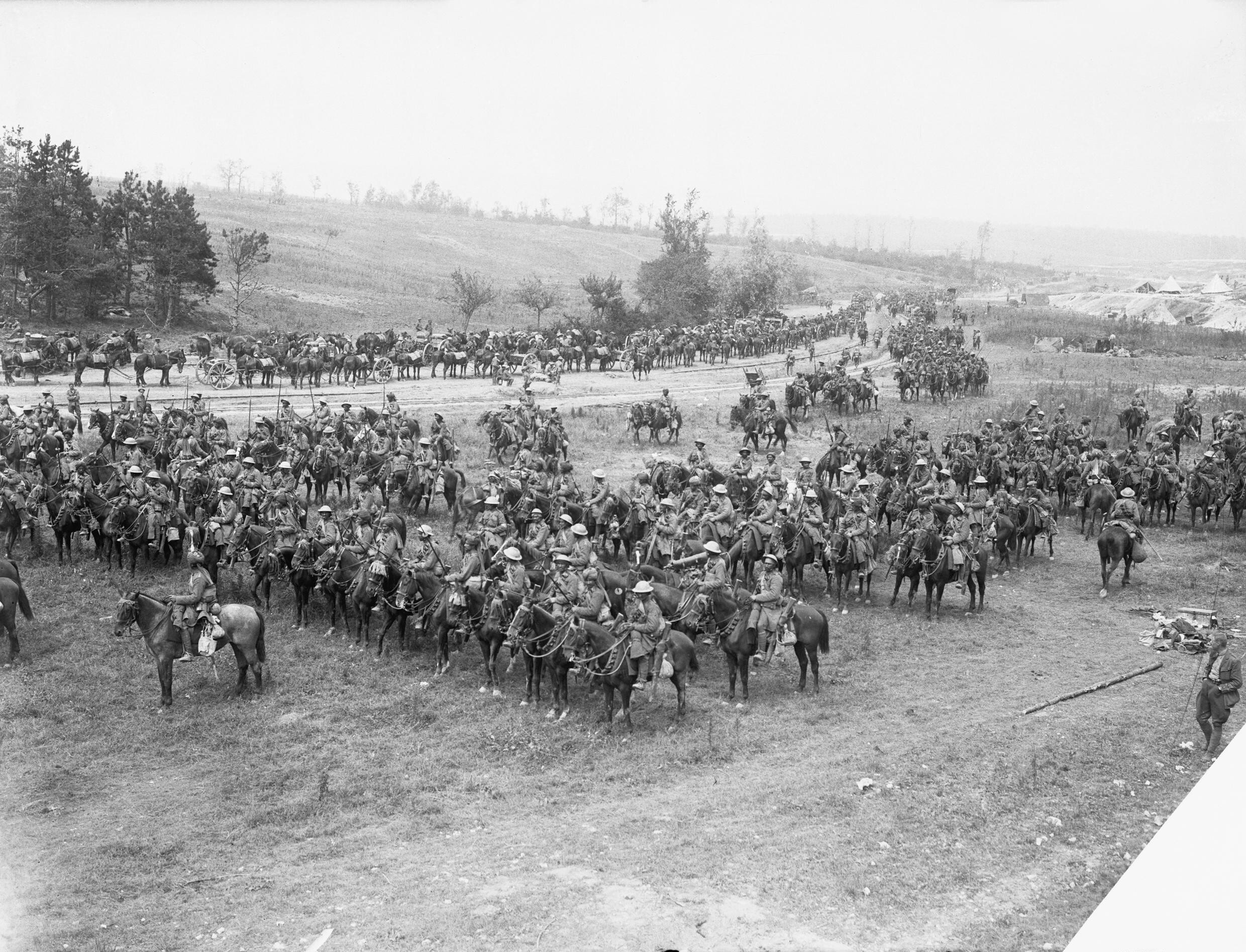
Deccan Horse, Bazentin Ridge

Observers saw many German troops retiring from Pozières and the British artillery was ordered to cease fire at 6:00 p.m. for patrols to check and south of the village the parties were driven back. The 21st Division continued the attack on the north-west corner of Bazentin le Petit Wood but when the post fell at 7:00 p.m., the Germans fell back to a machine-gun post only 50 yd (46 m) away. More false reports of success at Longueval arrived in the afternoon and the 7th Division was ordered to High Wood at 5:15 p.m. Long delays in passing the orders led to the first two battalions of the 91st Brigade taking until 6:45 p.m. to reach the jumping-off point. The 20th Deccan Horse and 7th Dragoon Guards were ready on the right flank but the 33rd Division (Major-General Herman Landon) from reserve had not arrived on the left.

A 3 Squadron crew saw the infantry and cavalry advance and the pilot dived on troops of III Battalion, IR 26 seen in standing crops, strafing them from a height of 300 ft (91 m). The observer dropped a sketch to the cavalry before departing, riddled by ground fire. About 100 Germans were killed or taken prisoner in the cornfields, eight cavalrymen were killed, about 100 were wounded and 130 horses were killed or wounded. Reinforcements of the 3rd Guard Division were caught by British machine-gun fire as they moved towards Bazentin le Petit and machine-gunners in Longueval were silenced by the cavalry machine-guns. German heavy artillery had been withdrawn and field artillery was unable to take aim at such a fast-moving target. The Germans fired two machine-guns at the cavalry which broke through between II Battalion and III Battalion IR 26 and got behind the 10th Company above Bazentin le Grand. (Note: Alarmist reports that the British cavalry had broken through between Longueval and Pozières and were advancing beyond High Wood, reached the German IV Corps and 2nd Army headquarters during the night. Below put the 8th, 5th, 24th Reserve and 8th Bavarian Reserve divisions at the disposal of General Friedrich Sixt von Armin, the IV Corps commander, to counter-attack the British breakthrough until the truth emerged.)

The two infantry battalions crossed the 0.75 mi (1.21 km) to High Wood, with a short delay on the left, due to German machine-gun fire but the battalions entered the wood and found few Germans. Undergrowth slowed their progress and the north end of the wood, protected by the new Switch Line and the west side could not be captured, the troops digging in across the middle and the east edge, helped by engineers to consolidate, despite several counter-attacks. The rest of the 2nd Indian Cavalry Division was sent back and the 1st Cavalry Division and the 3rd Cavalry Division never left their bivouacs at Buire-sur-l'Ancre and Daours. The 33rd Division failed to receive the orders to support the 7th Division, only having orders for an attack through the 21st Division on 15 July. By chance, the commander of the 100th Brigade found out and sent two battalions to cover a gap between High Wood and Bazentin le Petit. A lull came over the battlefield as night fell, except in Longueval, where the South Africans continued to attack against German machine-gun fire.

==== 15 July ====
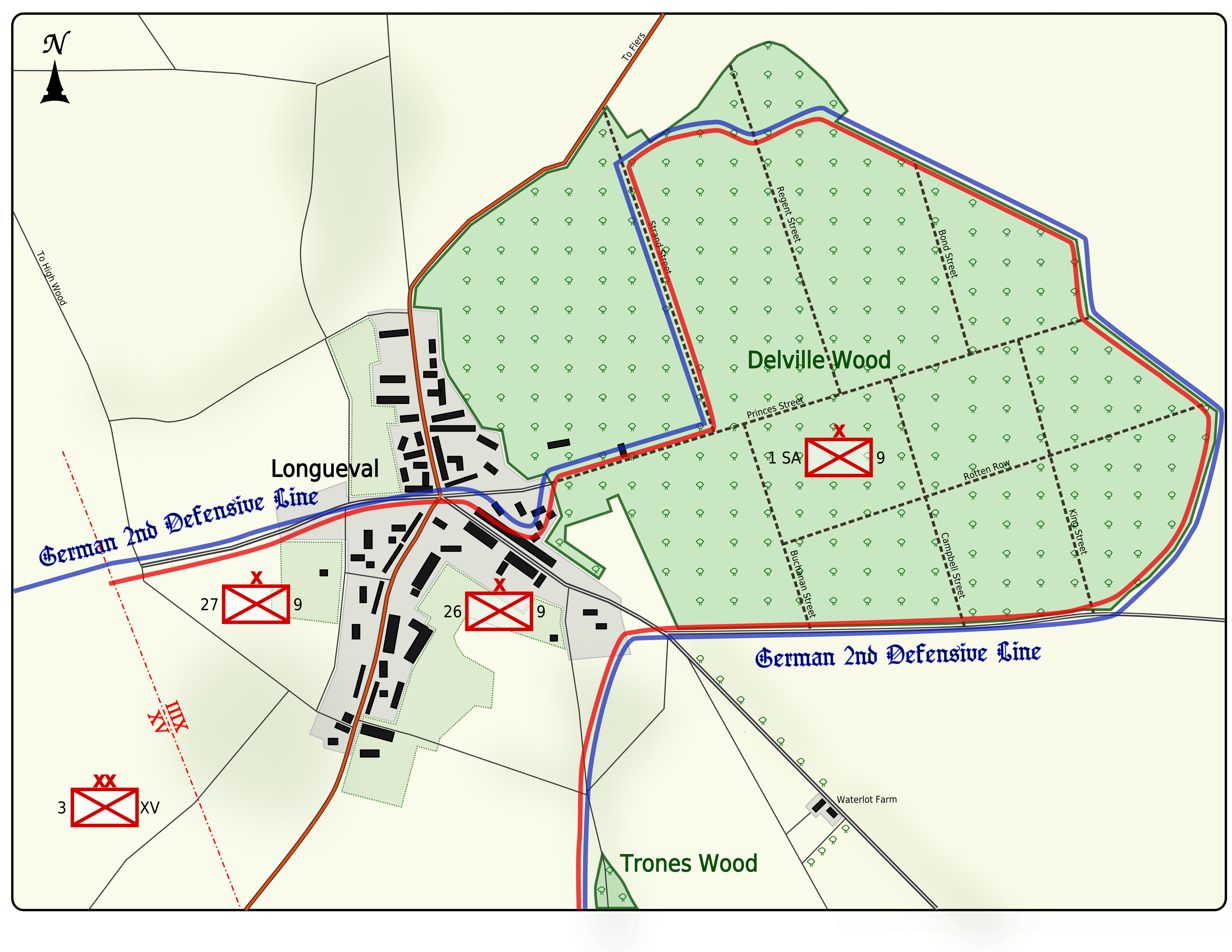
Map 2: Positions at 2:40 p.m. on 15 July 1916

On the right flank of the salient driven into the German second position, Delville Wood and the north end of Longueval gave a covered approach for German troops attacking from Flers and made attacks from the British line south of Waterlot Farm vulnerable to enfilade fire. At dawn the farm was attacked by one company, later reinforced by two 4th South African Regiment companies, which eventually captured the farm but German artillery-fire prevented consolidation until 17 July. Furse ordered another attack on Longueval by the 27th Brigade and the 1st South African Regiment, after an artillery and Stokes mortar bombardment.

A battalion bombed its way up North Street at 8:00 a.m. and another party tried to move through orchards on the west side but German reinforcements counter-attacked and recaptured the lost ground; another attack failed at 7:30 p.m. The South African Brigade was ordered to capture Delville Wood and moved up from reserve before dawn but by then, half the brigade had been detached. The brigade attacked at 6:15 a.m. from the south-west corner of the wood on a battalion front, with the 2nd Battalion forward, the 3rd Battalion in support and the 4th Battalion in reserve.

The attack was almost unopposed and by 7:00 a.m. the South Africans had captured the wood south of Prince's Street, despite the wreckage of fallen and uprooted trees. Tanner sent two companies to secure the northern perimeter of the wood and later, the 3rd Battalion advanced to the east and north-east. By 2:40 a.m., the wood was occupied, except for a German strong point in the north-western corner, adjoining Longueval. The South Africans began to dig in around the fringe of the wood in groups, forming strong points, supported by machine-guns in a salient, in touch with the 26th Brigade only along the south-western edge of the wood, next to Longueval. The troops had spades but roots and remnants of tree trunks made it possible only to dig shallow shell scrapes before German troops counter-attacked. A battalion of the 24th Reserve Division counter-attacked from the south-east at 11:30 a.m., having been given five minutes' notice and managed to advance to within 80 yd (73 m) of the wood, before being forced to dig in. A second battalion attacked from the Ginchy–Flers road was also repulsed, the battalions losing 528 men. In the early afternoon, a battalion of the 8th Division attacked the north-eastern face of the wood and was also repulsed, after losing all its officers.

At 3:00 p.m., Bavarian Reserve Infantry Regiment 6 (BRIR 6) of the 10th Bavarian Division, attacked from the east and part was repulsed by small-arms fire. At 4:40 p.m. Tanner reported to Lukin that German forces were massing to the north of the wood and he called for reinforcements, as the South Africans had already lost a company from the 2nd (Natal and Free State) Battalion. Tanner had received a company of the 4th (Scottish) Battalion from Longueval and Lukin sent a second company forward to reinforce the 3rd (Transvaal & Rhodesia) Battalion. Lukin urged Tanner and the battalion commanders to dig in regardless of fatigue, as heavy artillery fire was expected during the night or early the next morning. As night fell, German high explosive and gas shelling increased and a counter-attack by three battalions from the 8th Division and 12th Reserve Division began at midnight. With orders to recapture the wood "at all costs", the Germans got within 50 yd (46 m), before being driven under cover by artillery and machine-gun fire.

At 9:00 a.m. on 15 July, the 91st Brigade, 7th Division attacked High Wood but was stopped by machine-gun fire from the Switch Line, where it ran through the wood. After a bombardment by German artillery, II Battalion, IR 165 of the (German) 7th Division and III Battalion, IR 72 of the 8th Division, which had relieved the 183rd Division, counter-attacked at 2:30 p.m. and recaptured part of the wood, until driven out by the 91st Brigade reserve. At 4:45 p.m. the British attacked after a bombardment had inflicted many casualties on the German infantry but failed to overwhelm the survivors. High Wood was not visible to British ground observers and at 5:00 p.m. a 3 Squadron reconnaissance aircraft reported that British troops were in the west of the wood and south of the Bazentin-le-Petit road. Flags were seen in the west side of the wood but the east side was full of Germans and the Switch Trench was packed with German infantry.

High Wood was judged to be untenable and at 11:25 p.m. the 91st Brigade was withdrawn and the wood was bombarded by the divisional artillery. The 1/9th Highland Light Infantry, 33rd Division had also attacked the wood at 9:00 a.m., during an attack on the Switch Line, when three platoons advanced on the west side of the wood. Machine-gun fire from the II and III battalions, IR 93 in High Wood, hit the attackers from the flank and the attack was repulsed. The 16th Battalion, King's Royal Rifle Corps and the 2nd Worcester were sent forward as reinforcements but were back on the start line by 4:00 p.m. Two German infantry companies worked southwards from the Switch Line for 500 yd (460 m) later in the evening but another counter-attack was impossible, due to the tremendous volume of British barrage fire and the presence of British reconnaissance and artillery-observation aircraft.

To the left of the 7th Division, the 33rd Division attacked the Switch Line near Martinpuich, while III Corps attacked Pozières but co-operation proved impossible. The Switch Line was attacked at 9:00 a.m. by two battalions and another attack was made on the west side of High Wood. German machine-gunners caught the battalions in enfilade and despite reinforcement by the other two battalions of the 100th Brigade, the attack failed and the survivors were back on the start-line by 4:00 p.m. The 98th Brigade attacked on the left from Bazentin le Petit village on a 1,000 yd (910 m) front, encountered machine-gun crossfire and an artillery bombardment, the attack becoming a costly failure, which was also abandoned from 4:00–5:00 p.m. The 1st Division had taken over from the 21st Division along the west edge of Bazentin le Petit Wood and at 9:00 a.m. a battalion of the 2nd Brigade attacked towards the north-west up the trenches of the second position, taking 400 yd (370 m) of the front line and 200 yd (180 m) of the second line. At 5:00 p.m. a 3rd Brigade battalion resumed the attack and after dark managed to link with the 34th Division 600 yd (550 m) with a line of posts. (Note: The 34th Division attack on Pozières, 1,300 yd (1,200 m) distant, had been stopped 300–400 yd (270–370 m) short by German machine-gun fire.)

==== 16 July ====
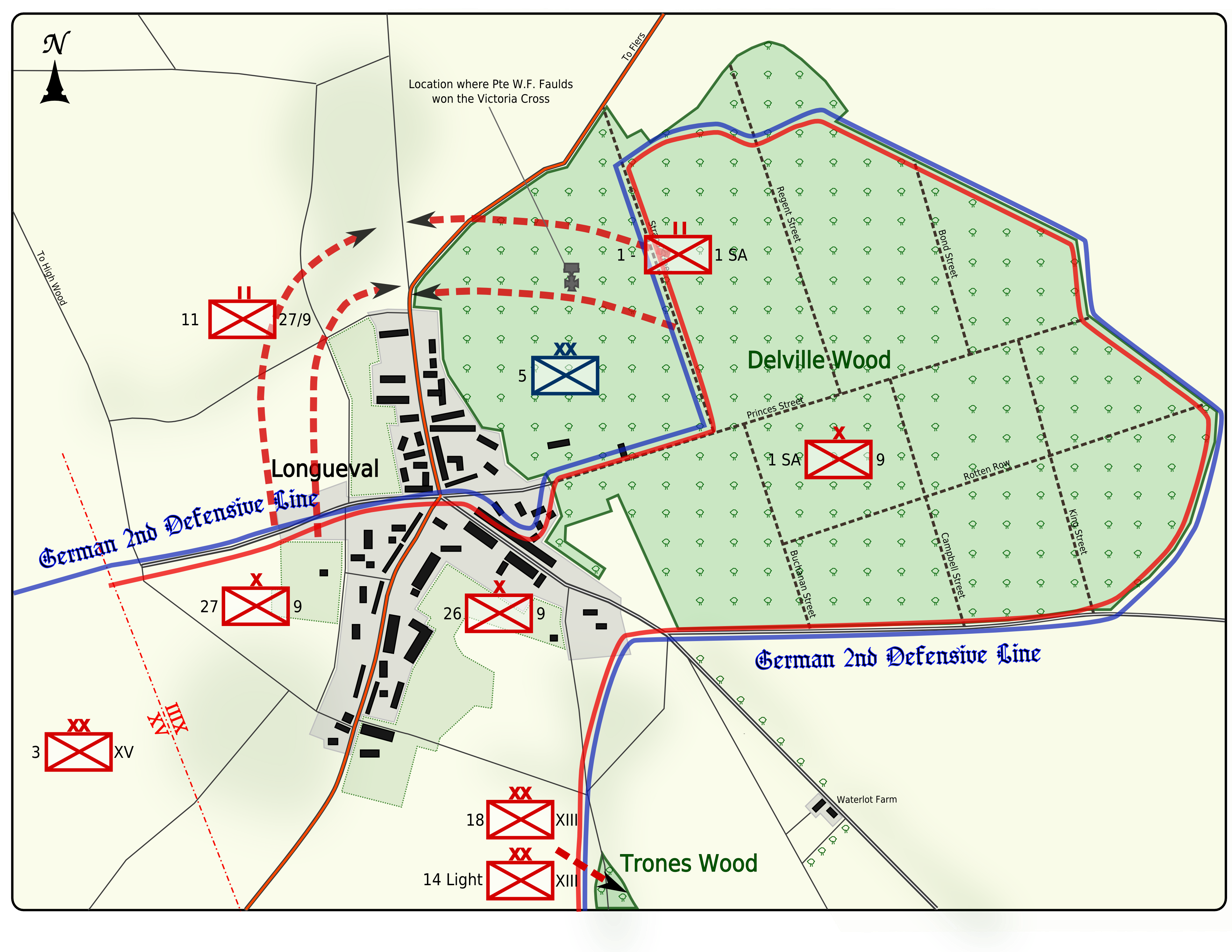
Delville Wood, 16 July

Furse ordered co-ordinated attacks on the north-west of Delville Wood and the north end of Longueval after a trench mortar bombardment. At 10:00 a.m. a battalion of the 27th Brigade attacked west of North Street and the 1st South African Regiment attacked from the west end of Prince's Street (which runs through the middle of the wood) but both units were repulsed by machine-gun fire. The bombardment re-commenced but the stalemate continued. The 9th (Scottish) Division decided to postpone attacks until the heavy artillery could re-bombard the village at 4:00 a.m. on 17 July but the Fourth Army headquarters demanded that the village be captured by dawn.

The artillery bombardment was brought forward to 12:30 a.m. when the infantry could have retired to a safe distance but German artillery-fire continued, cut all telephone lines and at 11:00 p.m. German infantry counter-attacked. Sixt von Armin had ordered a similar maximum effort and two regiments of the 8th Division and a regiment of the 12th Reserve Division were thrown in, without time to prepare or reconnoitre. The attackers attacked from the east, north-east and north. The Germans got close to the wood, before small-arms fire and artillery stopped the advance with many casualties. The British attack began at 2:00 a.m. on 17 June.

At High Wood, the 91st Brigade experienced some confusion in the mass of undergrowth but lack of communication with the rear led XV Corps HQ to judge the position of the brigade to be threatened and at 11:25 p.m. ordered the brigade to retire overnight, artillery keeping the wood under bombardment; by 8:00 a.m. the brigade had assembled behind Bazentin le Grand, having been able to remove nearly all of the wounded. II Battalion, IR 165 of the German 7th Division and III Battalion, IR 72 of the 8th Division followed up the withdrawal and re-occupied the wood, suffering many casualties to the British bombardment. On the 33rd Division front further west, attempts to organise another attack on 18 July took place amidst a constant bombardment of gas and lachrymatory shell. The 21st Division was relieved by the 33rd Division at Bazentin le Petit on 15 July and the 7th Division took over 300 yd (270 m) of front from the 3rd Division east of Bazentin le Grand Wood.

At 2:00 a.m. A battalion of the 1st Division tried to bomb along the second position but found deep mud which slowed movement and the Stokes mortars ran out of ammunition, due to the difficulty in bringing up more bombs over the sodden ground. The 3rd Brigade was ordered to make a frontal attack at midnight, after the artillery of the division had spent the day wire-cutting, batteries firing from the right flank in Caterpillar Valley being particularly effective. At 11:50 p.m. a ten-minute hurricane bombardment began and as it lifted, two battalions attacked to the north-east, keeping close to the creeping barrage, as another battalion bombed from the right flank. The German infantry retreated, leaving many dead and wounded behind and the British advanced beyond the objective until dawn. Posts were set up along German communication trenches running north-east and a defensive flank was set up in Black Watch Alley.

==== 17 July ====
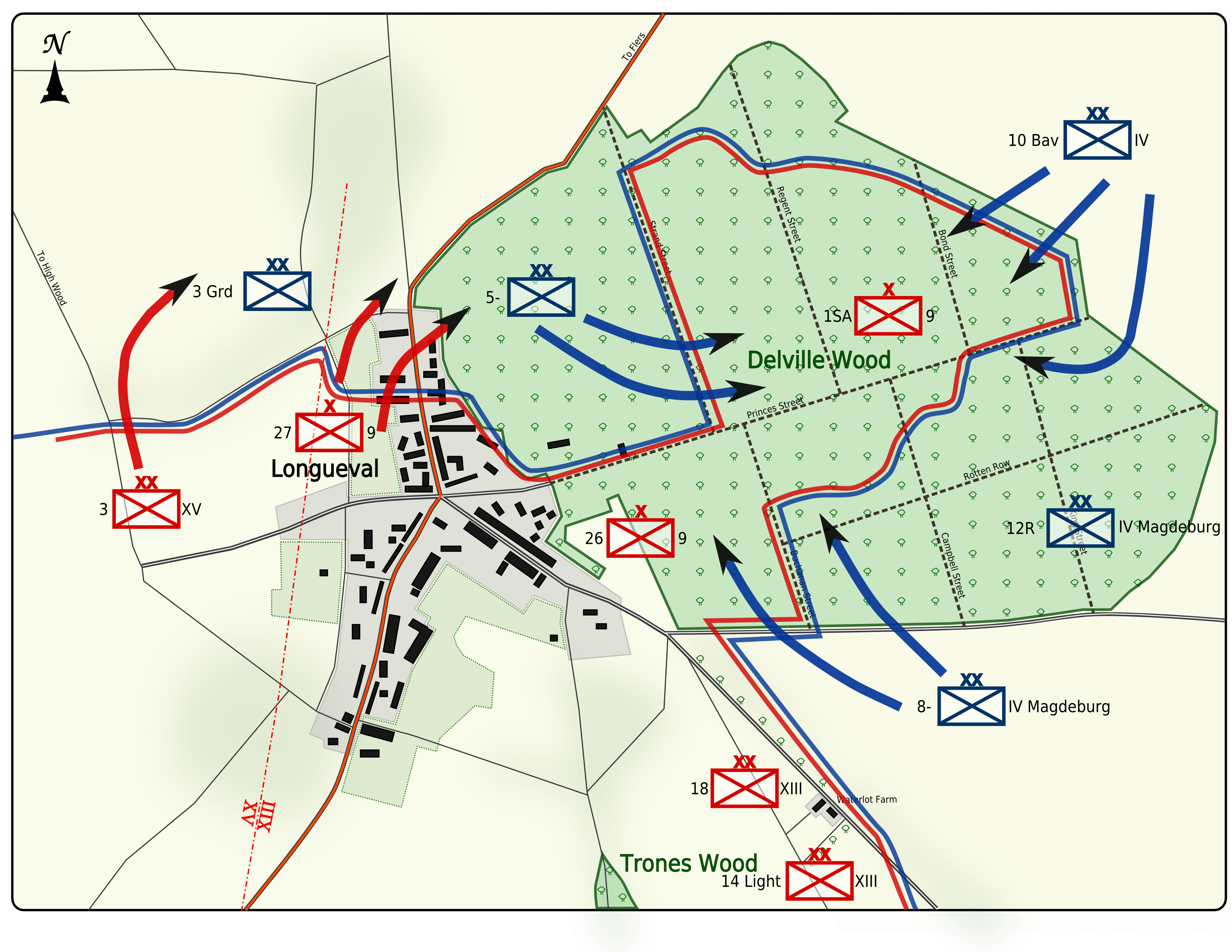
Delville Wood,17 July

The British artillery bombarded Delville Wood for an hour, the last two minutes being a hurricane bombardment and the infantry attacked at 2:00 a.m., the 27th Brigade advancing either side of North Street and the South Africans attacking northwards from Prince's Street and west from the Strand, a ride in the wood. The bombardment had failed to destroy the German machine-guns and despite bringing Stokes mortars into action, the attack was stopped around noon, having been costly for both sides. During the night, German artillery bombarded the village and wood with high explosive and gas shell, extending the bombardment to Montauban and the artillery in Caterpillar Valley.

Congreve decided that the next attack would be made by the 3rd Division from the west, before dawn on 18 July, to capture the objectives at all costs. The 76th Brigade (Brigadier-General Reginald Kentish) was to conduct the attack. The German 8th Division was also preparing to attack Delville Wood and troops at the most advanced positions were pulled back during a bombardment which began at 11:45 p.m. from about 70 medium and heavy guns and howitzers of Gruppe Gossler and Gruppe Sixt von Armin, with 116 field guns of the 8th Division and more from the 12th Reserve Division.

=== German 2nd Army ===
==== 12–17 July ====
Weather 11–18 July
Date	Rain mm	°F	
11 July	0.0	68°–52°	dull
12 July	0.1	68°–?	dull
13 July	0.1	70°–54°	dull
14 July	0.0	70°–?	dull
15 July	0.0	72°–47°	sun
16 July	4.0	73°–55°	dull
17 July	0.0	70°–59°	mist

On 12 July, I Battalion, Reserve Infantry Regiment 91 (RIR 91) attacked from Bazentin Wood with the 2nd and 4th companies on an 800 yd (730 m) front. After a brief artillery bombardment the attack was stopped halfway to Mametz Wood by British small-arms fire, the two companies suffering many casualties. The survivors joined troops from III Battalion, Bavarian Infantry Regiment 16 (BIR 16), Infantry Regiment 184 (IR 184) two sharpshooter groups and the 8th Company, Reserve Infantry Regiment 77 (RIR 77) in the line from Bazentin Wood to Longueval. Much of the trench had been flattened by shellfire; there were only six dug outs and no wire. Nearby, were III Battalion, Infantry Regiment 165 (IR 165), the Fusilier Guards recruit company and part of II Battalion, Infantry Regiment 90 (IR 190). Some troops of RIR 91 and BIR 16 detected signs of an attack, BIR 16 having patrols out but by 14 July the III Battalion was down to 236 men.

The British attack came against Gruppe Sixt von Armin with the 10th Bavarian Division from Guillemont to Delville Wood, Longueval and Bazentin le Grand, the 7th Division from Bazentin to Pozières and the 8th Division in reserve south of Bapaume. The British attack succeeded at several points, from which the troops worked sideways to roll up the German defenders, a tactic not used on 1 July. BIR 16 lost c. 2,300 men and the headquarters of Infantry Regiment Lehr, BIR 16, I Battalion, RIR 91 and II Battalion, BIR 16 were captured. Sixt von Armin, who had taken over from Longueval to the Ancre that morning, ordered troops to hold their positions. The 7th Division had been relieving the 183rd Division and part was sent to Longueval and the second line further back, along with resting units from the 185th, 17th Reserve, 26th Reserve and 3rd Guard divisions and Landwehr Brigade Ersatz Battalion 55 (7th Landwehr Division), the equivalent of fourteen battalions. (Note: After receiving alarmist reports of British cavalry in High Wood and that Flers and Martinpuich had fallen, the 5th, 8th, 8th Bavarian Reserve and 24th Reserve divisions were ordered to counter-attack. When the true situation was discovered, the counter-stroke was cancelled and the 5th and 8th divisions returned to reserve.)

At Delville Wood, the II Battalion, Reserve Infantry Regiment 107 (RIR 107) of the 24th Reserve Division attacked after 11:30 a.m. having been given five minutes' notice and managed to get within 80 yd (73 m) of the wood before artillery and machine-gun fire forced the survivors to stop and dig in. The III Battalion, RIR 107 that attacked from the road between Ginchy and Flers just after, was also stopped, the attackers suffering 528 casualties. At 1:30 p.m. I Battalion, Infantry Regiment 72 (IR 72) of the 8th Division attacked the north-east section of the wood, was repulsed and lost all its officers. Another attack during the night by three battalions around the wood also failed, Infantry Regiment 153 (IR 153) reporting that every attack was a costly failure, being defeated by British fire power. A systematic bombardment of the wood began to prepare an attack on 18 July.

=== Air operations ===
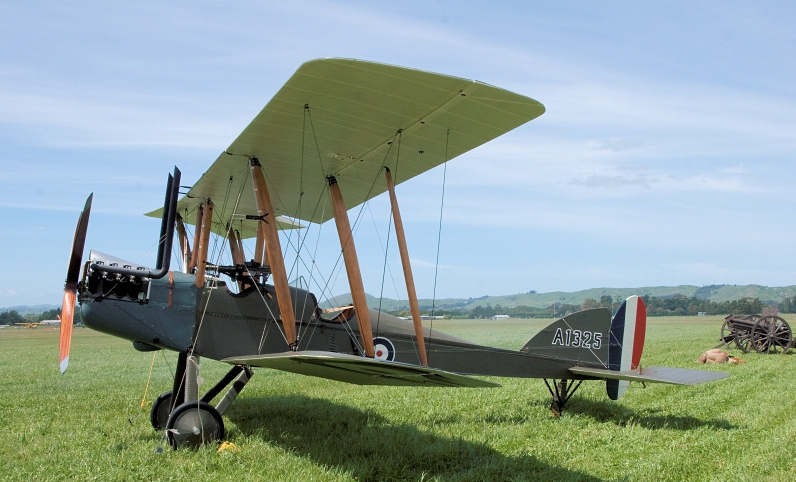
B.E.2f A1325 at Masterton, New Zealand, 2009)

Before the attack on 14 July, the RFC watched for German road and rail activity and on 6 July, a 3 Squadron pilot bombed a troop train east of Vélu; later that morning, more trains were seen in Cambrai and Marcoing (later discovered to be the arrival of the 123rd Division from Flanders). Reconnaissance over Le Cateau and Landrecies found routine operations towards Cambrai and St Quentin. Next day, the lines from Cambrai and Bapaume to Roisel showed that troops were being rushed to the front south of the Somme and on 8 July, there was a lull in rail traffic. On 9 July, trains were seen running between Lille and Douai, implying more reinforcements from the north and on 11 July, a column of vehicles on the road to Tournai was seen by a night reconnaissance aircraft from 20 Squadron, thought to be carrying ammunition for the 123rd Division. Aircraft and balloon observation discovered that German units from Thélus to Lens were moving to the Somme (despite rain on 12 July). RFC bombing sorties were directed against the railway stations receiving German reinforcements and on 9 July, six Morane scouts escorted six aircraft of 21 Squadron to bomb Cambrai station, obtaining three hits. Bapaume station was bombed by 27 Squadron and two British aircraft were shot down.

The German artillery south of the Albert–Bapaume road had fallen back since 1 July, increasing demands for artillery observation, methodically to locate and register new German artillery emplacements, for counter-battery fire. In the afternoon of 9 July, German supply dumps at Le Sars and an HQ at Le Transloy were bombed by 21 Squadron. Havrincourt Wood was attacked on 11 July by 20 bombers and 17 fighters. On 13 July, the RFC attacked trains on the Douai–Cambrai and Valenciennes–Cambrai lines and managed to derail a train near Aubigny-au-Bac. The front due to be attacked on 14 July and the third position beyond were photographed and studied from low altitude, despite much small-arms fire from German troops. On the day, cloud cover came down to 800 ft (240 m) and ground haze limited visibility to 600 yd (550 m). A 9 Squadron observer reported that the 3rd Division had overrun two trench lines and was in Bazentin le Grand and the 9th (Scottish) Division had been seen preparing to attack Waterlot Farm. Other observers saw enough infantry and flares through the mist to call up the cavalry and a ruse was attempted at 10:30 a.m., when an observer sent a wireless message that the British had broken through and cavalry were pursuing German troops.

At 1:00 p.m. South African troops were seen running into Longueval and at 2:00 p.m. were observed in the north end, the rest of the village being captured by 4:00 p.m.; an artillery observer saw that the 7th Division was beyond Bazentin le Petit and the division was ordered to attack High Wood, with the Secunderabad Cavalry on the right. The cavalry advanced at 6:00 p.m. with the knowledge from earlier air observation that little opposition was to be expected. A crew from 3 Squadron saw German parties hiding in crops and folds and flew low over them to divert their attention and warn the cavalry. The observer fired his Lewis gun at the Germans until the cavalry came up, then drew a sketch of the German dispositions and dropped it on the Sowars (troopers). The 7th Division flares were seen in High Wood at 8:40 p.m. by a 3 Squadron observer. Next day, 9 Squadron watched German counter-attacks on Longueval and directed counter-battery fire, photographed the area and reported events. Fighter escorts from 22 Squadron found no German aircraft and attacked ground targets instead. German advances into Longueval endangered the troops in High Wood, at 5:00 p.m. a 3 Squadron aircraft reconnoitred and the crew report led to the British troops being ordered out of the wood.

== Aftermath ==
=== Analysis ===
On 11 July, GHQ Intelligence had written that on the German side,

...the admixture of units has been so great... that there are no longer any defined divisional sectors.... The line is now held by a confused mass... whose units appear to have been thrown into [the] front line as stop gaps.

The OHL reserve was down to one division and that the Germans would have to begin milking divisions for reserves, which led Haig and Rawlinson to believe that attrition was working quickly. Haig thought that German resistance might break within two weeks. GHQ was ignorant of the inaccuracy of the intelligence being provided yet the assumptions and conclusions being made were understandable on the evidence. The success of the attack on 14 July increased British optimism, Haig describing it as 'the best day we have had in this war'. Haig and Rawlinson were encouraged by the capture of two German regimental commanders and their staffs and the Fourth Army wrote that, "...the enemy is in confusion and demoralised". Later information showed that the Germans had been forced to improvise, such as sending forward a recruit depot as reinforcements. During 16 July, the Fourth Army concluded that it was necessary to organise another broad front attack and that the Germans would use the respite to reinforce Delville Wood, Longueval and High Wood. Rawlinson hoped that the German could be provoked into costly counter-attacks and concentrated on preparing a new attack for 18 July, the German positions being subjected to a constant bombardment in the meantime. Attempts to arrange the next attack and co-ordinate with a French attack on the north side of the Somme foundered due to the effect of the massed bombardments on the ground, made worse by rain which turned it into deep mud, paralysing movement; the attack did not take place until the night of 21/22 July, and was a costly failure. Three days later, the Fourth Army noted that German morale was improving, due mainly to better supply of the front line and by the end of July, British hopes of immediate success had faded.

In 1928, Henry Jones, the official historian of the RFC, RNAS and the RAF, wrote that the battle showed that infantry co-operation would be a permanent feature of British air operations. Recognition flares had proved effective, although there had been too few and infantry were reluctant to risk revealing their positions to German artillery observers. Scheduled illumination was a failure and infantry began to wait for a call from the contact aeroplane by signal lamp or by Klaxon. RFC observers reported that direct observation was the most effective method and that flying low enough to be fired on worked best, although this led to many aircraft being damaged and one lost to a British shell. Artillery-observation was hampered by bad weather but the rolling countryside led to constant demands for sorties for the observation of counter-battery fire; when the weather grounded the RFC, attacks could fail for lack of observation.

Aircrew photographed the attack front, reported on the condition of wire and trenches, assessed the opposition, linked headquarters and front line and then joined in by bombing and strafing from low altitude. Artillery-observation led to the neutralisation of German batteries, destruction of trenches and strong points and exploitation of fleeting opportunities to bombard German troops in the open. British aircraft caused a feeling of defencelessness among German troops and deprived them of the support of Die Fliegertruppen, leaving them dependent on wasteful unobserved area artillery-fire, while being vulnerable to British aircrew seeing muzzle-flashes that gave away battery positions. German fighter reinforcements were slow to arrive on the Somme and prevented Die Fliegertruppen from challenging Anglo-French aerial dominance. The morale of British troops was correspondingly increased because German artillery could not conduct observed shoots against them and German troops could not move without being seen by the RFC.

In 1938, Wilfrid Miles, the official historian, wrote that it had been a mistake for the attacking divisions to be held back from exploiting the victory straight away. There appeared to be no Germans left to oppose the 7th Division and the 3rd Division by 10:00 a.m., when several officers walked forward unopposed. Watts wanted to send the fresh 91st Brigade into High Wood but had orders to wait for the cavalry; Haldane was prevented by the Fourth Army HQ from using the 76th Brigade for a pursuit, having to keep it ready for German counter-attacks. Miles wrote that authority could have been delegated to the divisional commanders on the spot, since the 33rd Division had already arrived at Montauban and a vigorous pursuit would have made the prospects for the cavalry much more favourable when they managed to reach the front line. It may even have been possible for the infantry to penetrate High Wood and dig in on the ridge, threatening Delville Wood and Pozières, rather than the two-month slog that followed.

In a 2001 PhD thesis, Kathryn Snowden wrote that the 21st Division succeeded because of the weight and accuracy of the British bombardment enabled the night assembly to take place in safety. The German wire and trenches were destroyed and the few German survivors were relatively easily overcome. Despite the destructive effect of the artillery, Snowden wrote that it was more significant that inexperienced infantry had shown a capacity for tactical evolution. The 110th Brigade had advanced faster than the 7th Division, captured all its objectives and held them against the unexpectedly large counter-attacks that lasted from 10:00 to 2:00 p.m. The coincidence of the German relief of the 123rd Division by the 7th Division had meant that three regiments of fresh troops (about 5,000 infantry) were available. The capture of 0.25 sq mi (0.65 km^{2}) cost 3,000 casualties, the highest divisional losses in the attack; more ground could have been taken had exploitation been allowed before the German counter-attacks began.

In 2005, Prior and Wilson called the attack a considerable achievement, that showed that if an objective could be bombarded by enough shells, it could be captured but that this had been only the first stage in the Fourth Army plan, which had extravagant ambitions to be fulfilled by infantry and cavalry beyond the terrain devastated by the artillery. Rawlinson had realised that the advance achieved on 14 July had been possible because of the accuracy and extent of the bombardment, which had smashed the German defences, obliterated the wire and exhausted the German survivors by concussion. Prior and Wilson wrote that the British failed to study the reasons for the results not reaching expectations and that this meant that Rawlinson and Haig had not learned from their mistakes. J. P. Harris, in 2009, wrote that the Fourth Army made solid gains on 14 July, with fewer casualties than on 1 July at much greater cost to the Germans. When the cavalry finally managed to attack in the evening, it inflicted about 100 casualties for eight dead. In two weeks the British had advanced beyond the German second position south of the Albert–Bapaume road and faced only scanty field defences. The victory was a false dawn, because the German 2nd Army improvised defences and converted High Wood and Delville Wood into fortresses.

Piecemeal reinforcement of the German defences since 1 July had caused administrative chaos, an example being the crowding of the field kitchens of five regiments onto ground north of Courcelette, having to share the Stockachergraben, the last open communication trench, to carry food forward at night. Below added to his secret order of 3 July,

Despite my ban on the voluntary relinquishment of positions, apparently certain sectors have been evacuated without an enemy attack. Every commander is responsible for ensuring that his troops fight to the last man to defend the sector for which he is responsible. Failure to do so will lead to Court Martial proceedings. This Army Order is to be made known to all commanders.

— 17 July 1916

Staff officers of the German IV Corps wrote a report on the experience of fighting the British in July, which dwelt on the details of the defensive battle, in which emphasis was given to fortification, the co-operation of infantry and artillery and the necessity for maintaining communications using every means possible, to overcome the chaos of battle. British infantry had learnt much since the Battle of Loos (25 September – 14 October 1915) and attacked vigorously, which was assumed to be due to the confidence of the infantry in the overwhelming power of their artillery. British tactical leadership was found lacking and men tended to surrender if surrounded. Units were assembled close together and suffered many casualties to German artillery but the British showed skill in rapid consolidation of captured ground and tenacity in defence, small parties with automatic weapons being most difficult to overcome. German infantry remained confident of their superiority but British medium and heavy artillery outnumbered German guns and the quality of British ammunition had improved. German infantry and artillery positions were subjected to methodical bombardment, villages just behind the front line and ground affording natural cover were continuously bombarded and artillery registration and aim were assisted by organised aerial observation, aircraft also frequently being used to bomb villages at night. British frontal attacks by cavalry against infantry had suffered "heavy losses", reflecting badly on the tactical knowledge of British higher commanders.

Ill-prepared German attacks almost always failed and care needed to be taken to understand the difference between hasty counter-attacks (Gegenstöße) soon after the loss of ground with troops on the spot and organised counter-attacks (Gegenangriffe) ordered by commanders further back, which needed more troops from reserve and deliberate preparation because of the inevitable delays in movement, communication and the preparation of artillery-support. A Gegenangriff worked best with fresh troops, advancing behind a creeping barrage, lifting according to a timetable. Attacks into woods needed a different formation than advances by skirmish lines in open country, one line being followed by small columns. Flame-throwers had been ineffective because of the difficulty of carrying such heavy equipment through obstructions and the lack of view and should be reserved for defined objectives which had been studied beforehand.

=== Casualties ===
The Fourth Army suffered 9,194 casualties, 1,159 in the 9th (Scottish) Division, 2,322 in the 3rd Division, 2,819 in the 7th Division and 2,894 in the 21st Division. BIR 16 had 2,300 casualties on 14 July, of the 2,559 losses it suffered on the Somme that month. In July, the British suffered 158,786 casualties on the Somme, the French 49,859 (a combined total of 208,645 casualties) and the German 2nd Army suffered 103,000, 49.4 per cent of Allied casualties.

=== Subsequent operations ===
After the Battle of Bazentin Ridge, the British tried to straighten the salient at Delville Wood by advancing on both flanks, to reach High Wood and to capture Pozières on the left (northern) flank for good jumping-off positions for another general attack. The Germans tried to eliminate the salient at Delville Wood, to retain ground that shielded German positions from view and overlooked (gave observation over) British positions. For the rest of July and August, both sides fought for control of the three areas but struggled to maintain a high tempo of operations because of ammunition shortages, high casualties and wet weather which reduced visibility and made movement much more difficult. Both sides were reduced to piecemeal attacks and piecemeal defence on narrow fronts, except for a few bigger, wider-front attacks. Until September, most attacks were defeated by defensive fire power and the inclement weather, which frequently turned the battlefield into a mud-slough.
