= Attacks on High Wood =

1916 attack during the Battle of the Somme in WWI

- Part of the Battle of the Somme during the First World War
- Relief map of the Somme battlefield, 1916
Date	14 July – 15 September 1916
Location	Adjacent to Longueval, in the département of the Somme, France 50°2′24.9″N 2°47′4.58″E
Result	British victory

Belligerents
United Kingdom of Great Britain and Ireland	German Empire

Commanders and leaders
(United Kingdom of Great Britain and Ireland) Douglas Haig (United Kingdom of Great Britain and Ireland) Henry Rawlinson	(German Empire) (Kingdom of Bavaria) Crown Prince Rupprecht of Bavaria (German Empire) Fritz von Below

Strength
Parts of 5 divisions	Parts of 8 divisions

Casualties and losses
13,111 (High Wood and vicinity)	9,498 (High Wood and vicinity: incomplete)
- Longueval, in the département of the Somme, France

The Attacks on High Wood, near Bazentin le Petit in the Somme département of northern France, took place between the British Fourth Army and the German 1st Army during the Battle of the Somme. After the Battle of Bazentin Ridge on 14 July 1916, High Wood lay undefended for most of the day but delays in communication and confusion caused by orders and counter-orders from British corps headquarters, which had overlapping responsibilities, led to the occupation of High Wood being forestalled by German reserves, which had moved forward to counter-attack British troops in the villages of Bazentin-le-Grand and Bazentin-le-Petit.

Men from the 7th Division managed to occupy the southern half of the wood and two cavalry squadrons advanced on the east side to Wood Lane, which connected the wood to Longueval. On 15 July, the wood was evacuated by the survivors and the cavalry retired. The British and the Germans fought for control of the wood from 14 July to 15 September. Both sides had many casualties and chronic communication problems; inclement weather grounded aircraft, obscured the view and slowed movement on the roads, which had been severely bombarded and turned to mud as soon as it rained. Trenches and shell holes filled with water, which made infantry movement exceedingly difficult and exhausted trench garrisons. The British and French found it impossible to arrange co-ordinated attacks and fought many small piecemeal actions, rather than general attacks until 15 September.

British–French co-operation broke down again and the French did not attack on 15 September, when the British captured the wood during the Battle of Flers–Courcelette (15–22 September). The German defenders had great difficulty finding fresh troops for the Somme front, despite ending the Battle of Verdun (21 February – 20 December) and had to send divisions to the Eastern Front and to Romania after it declared war on 27 August. Turnover of German divisions was high and many had to be withdrawn and replaced after fourteen days in the front line. The Germans lacked the resources to make many big organised counter-attacks and those at High Wood and the vicinity were often as costly and ineffective as corresponding British attacks.

== Background ==
=== High Wood ===
The French name for the wood was Bois des Foureaux (now Bois des Fourcaux) but to the British infantry it was known as High Wood. The wood is on the D 107 road, which runs from Martinpuich to Longueval, about half-way between Bazentin-le-Petit and Bazentin-le-Grand to the south-west, Martinpuich to the north-west and Longueval to the south-east. Delville Wood lay 3,500 yd (2.0 mi; 3.2 km) to the east. Before the Battle of the Somme the wood was behind the German second line, which lay in front of Bazentin-le-Grand and Bazentin-le-Petit. The wood crowned a ridge which was about 100 ft (30 m) high and overlooked the ground around for a considerable distance. An attack on the wood could be seen easily from the ridge which ran through the north end of the wood. Before the battle the trees were undamaged and the ground had not been churned by shell-fire.

== Prelude ==
=== German preparations ===
Despite considerable debate among German staff officers, Falkenhayn laid down a continuation of the policy of unyielding defence. (Note: Falkenhayn implied after the war that the psychology of German soldiers, shortage of manpower and lack of reserves made the policy inescapable, since the troops necessary to seal off breakthroughs did not exist. High losses incurred in holding ground by a policy of no retreat, were preferable to higher losses, voluntary withdrawals and the effect of a belief that soldiers had discretion to avoid battle. When a more flexible policy was substituted later, discretion was still reserved to army commanders.) On the Somme front, the fortification construction plan ordered by Falkenhayn in January 1915 had been completed. The reserve line, renamed the second line, was as well built and wired as the first line and had been built beyond the range of Allied field artillery, to force attackers to stop and move their artillery forward before an attack. The second line had become the front line in the area of High Wood, after the Battle of Bazentin Ridge on 14 July. German artillery was organised in a series of sperrfeuerstreifen (barrage sectors) for the simpler task of placing barrages on no man's land. Telephone lines between the German front lines and their artillery support were often cut but the front line troops used signal flares to communicate. High Wood had grassy rides and many saplings in the undergrowth, which impeded movement off the rides and the wood had been fortified.

=== British preparations ===
General Henry Rawlinson, the Fourth Army commander, planned an attack at dawn on 14 July, when there would be insufficient light for German machine-gunners to see far ahead. XIII Corps was to attack with two divisions from Longueval to Bazentin-le-Grand and XV Corps was to attack from Bazentin-le-Petit to the north-west edge of Mametz Wood; one division of III Corps was to attack further west. The British infantry was to cross up to 1,200 yd (1,100 m) of no man's land in the dark and assemble close to the German second line. In this area the second line had become the front line, after the British and French advances during the Battle of Albert (1–13 July). A preparatory bombardment began on 11 July and a shortage of heavy artillery ammunition along with transport difficulties over wet and cut up ground, were eased by the air supremacy of the Royal Flying Corps (RFC), which made it impossible for the German air units to reconnoitre behind the British lines. On 14 July, the 9th (Secunderabad) Cavalry Brigade of the 2nd Indian Cavalry Division were to capture the wood and the Switch Line either side with two cavalry regiments, after which the 7th Division was to relieve the cavalry and the 21st Division was to advance and occupy the area between Bazentin-le-Petit and Martinpuich. The advance was expected to assist III Corps to the west, when it attacked the German second position and then combined with the 1st Division attack at 2:30 p.m., as the 34th Division probed towards Pozières in the west.

== Battle ==
=== Battle of Bazentin Ridge, 14–15 July ===
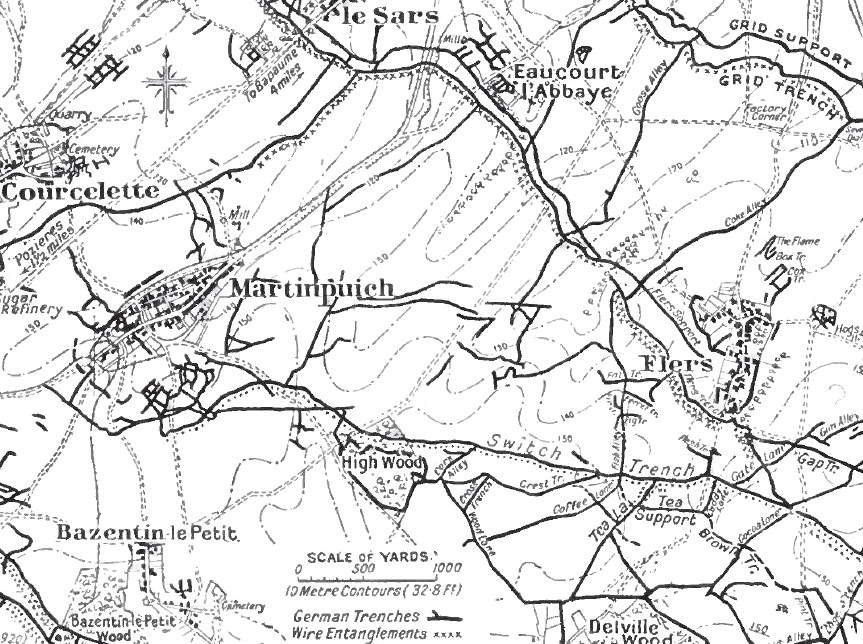
German defensive lines, High Wood, Somme 1916

The Fourth Army attacked High Wood with divisions from XV Corps on 14 July, during the Battle of Bazentin Ridge. The wood was abandoned by the Germans but delays meant that the British did not attempt to occupy it until 7:00 p.m. Rawlinson had ordered the 7th Division forward at 12:15 p.m. but the order was over-ruled by Lieutenant-General Henry Horne, the XV Corps commander, because the capture of Longueval, on the flank of the proposed advance, was incomplete. The 7th Division advanced and two battalions managed to occupy the southern half of the wood, after German reserves had arrived and counter-attacked several times. On the right flank, a squadron from each of the 7th Dragoon Guards and the 20th Deccan Horse of the 2nd Indian Cavalry Division, had been ordered forward at 7:40 a.m. but took until early evening to make their way across trenches and devastated ground.

The 20th Deccan Horse made the only cavalry charge of the Battle of the Somme, against III Battalion, Infantry Regiment 26 concealed in crops east of the wood. The crew of an aircraft of 3 Squadron RFC saw the infantry and cavalry advance and the pilot dived at the German troops, strafing them from a height of 300 ft (91 m). The observer dropped a sketch of the German dispositions onto the cavalry before the aircraft departed, having been riddled by ground fire. Reserves of the 2nd Guard Division were incapable of assisting the defenders, as they had been caught by British machine-gun fire as they moved up towards Bazentin-le-Petit and machine-gunners in Longueval were silenced by the cavalry machine-guns. German heavy artillery had been withdrawn and field artillery was unable to take aim at such a fast-moving target. About 100 Germans were killed or taken prisoner in the cornfields, eight cavalrymen were killed, about 100 were wounded and 130 horses were killed or wounded.

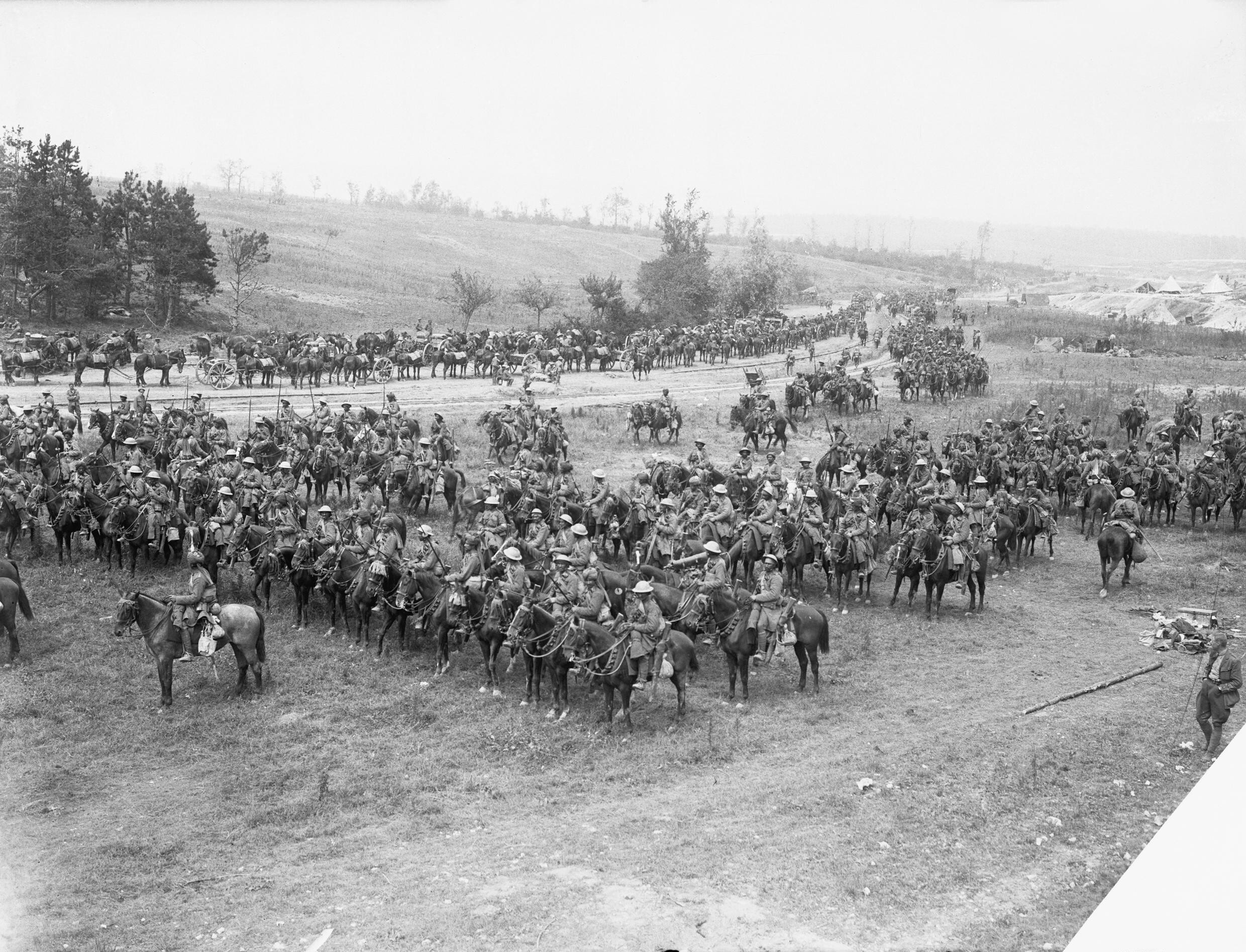
Deccan Horse, Bazentin Ridge

The cavalry took up a line from Longueval to the southern corner of High Wood until the early morning of 15 July and began to withdraw from 3:40 a.m. Alarmist reports that the British cavalry had broken through between Longueval and Pozières and were advancing beyond High Wood, reached the German IV Corps and 2nd Army headquarters. General Fritz von Below, the 2nd Army commander, put the 8th Division, 5th Division, 24th Reserve Division and the 8th Royal Bavarian Reserve Division at the disposal of General Friedrich Sixt von Armin, the IV Corps commander, to counter-attack the British breakthrough. When the truth emerged, the counter-attack was called off and the 5th and 8th Bavarian Reserve divisions went back into reserve. At 9:00 a.m. on 15 July, the 7th Division attacked the wood with the 91st Brigade. The British infantry were stopped by machine-gun fire from the Switch Line where it ran through the wood. After a preliminary bombardment by German artillery, II Battalion, Infantry Regiment 165 of the 7th Division and III Battalion, Infantry Regiment 72 of the 8th Division, which had relieved the 183rd Division, counter-attacked at 2:30 p.m. and recaptured part of the wood, until driven out by the brigade reserve.

At 4:45 p.m. the British attacked after a bombardment which inflicted many casualties on the German infantry but failed to overwhelm the defenders. High Wood was not visible to British ground observers and at 5:00 p.m. a 3 Squadron reconnaissance sortie, reported that British troops were in the west of the wood and south of the Bazentin-le-Petit road. Flags were seen in the west side of the wood but the east side was full of Germans and the Switch Trench was packed with German infantry. High Wood was judged to be untenable and at 11:25 p.m. the 91st Brigade was withdrawn and the wood was bombarded by the divisional artillery. The 1/9th Highland Light Infantry (HLI) of the 33rd Division had also attacked the wood at 9:00 a.m. on 15 July, during an attack on the Switch Line, when three platoons advanced on the west side of the wood. Machine-gun fire from the II and III battalions of Infantry Regiment 93 in High Wood, hit the attackers from the flank and the attack was repulsed. The 16th Battalion, King's Royal Rifle Corps and the 2nd Worcester were sent forward as reinforcements but were back on the start line by 4:00 p.m. Two German infantry companies worked southwards from the Switch Line for 500 yd (460 m) later in the evening but a renewal of the counter-attack was found to be impossible, due to the tremendous volume of British barrage fire and the presence of British reconnaissance and artillery-observation aircraft. (Note: A soldier's eye-view of the 14 July attack and its aftermath can be found in The War the Infantry Knew (1938), privately published by J. C. Dunne as a more accurate account of the experience of ordinary soldiers in the Great War.)

=== July ===
==== 20–21 July ====
Weather (14–31 July 1916)
Date	Rain mm	°F	
14	0.0	70°–?	dull
15	0.0	72°–47°	sun
16	4.0	73°–55°	dull
17	0.0	70°–59°	mist
18	0.0	72°–52°	dull
19	0.0	70°–50°	dull
20	0.0	75°–52°	fine
21	0.0	72°–52°	fine
22	0.1	77°–55°	dull
23	0.0	68°–54°	dull
24	0.0	70°–55°	dull hot
25	0.0	66°–50°	dull
26	0.0	66°–50°	dull
27	8.0	81°–61°	hazy
28	0.0	77°–59°	dull hot
29	0.0	81°–57°	dull
30	0.0	82°–57°	fine
31	0.0	82°–59°	hot

The 33rd Division attacked again at dusk on 19 July, when a battalion from the 100th Brigade pushed advanced posts towards the wood from Bazentin-le-Petit as a flank guard. Two battalions of the 19th Brigade crept forward on 20 July, during a bombardment and attacked when it lifted at 3:25 a.m. The infantry got into the wood against machine-gun fire from the 8th Division troops of II Battalion, Infantry Regiment 165 and part of III Battalion, Infantry Regiment 72 in the Switch Line and a strong point in the western corner. Observers of 3 Squadron flew over the wood and despite mist, glimpsed enough to report that all but the north end of the wood had been captured and in the evening reported the loss of the north end to a counter-attack.

A third battalion on the right flank arrived and helped to occupy the southern portion of the wood, thirty Germans being taken prisoner. During the afternoon of 21 July, another battalion went forward and managed to reach the northern fringe of the wood. Due to the number of British casualties, two more battalions were sent forward as reinforcements but as dark fell a German bombardment forced the British from the north end of the wood, which was re-occupied by German troops near Foureaux Riegel (known to the British as the Switch Line) and both sides dug in. During the fighting for High Wood, the 5th Division and 7th Division attacked the Switch Line to the east. The 51st (Highland) Division relieved the 33rd Division after dark. (Note: During the 7th Division attack, Private Theodore Veale of the 8th Devons won the Victoria Cross.)

==== 22/23 July ====
Fog covered the area around High Wood until 22 July when vague reports of German digging in front of the Switch Line were confirmed. The crew of a 34 Squadron aircraft dived through the mist and saw a new German trench, several hundred yards in front of the Switch Trench, parallel to the British line from Bazentin-le-Peitit to High Wood. This new Intermediate Line was full of German troops and the III Corps headquarters immediately cancelled the 19th (Western) Division attack on the Switch Line, to make the new line the first objective. On the night of 22/23 July, the 51st (Highland) Division attacked High Wood with two battalions of the 154th Brigade at 1:30 a.m., to capture the rest of the wood and 600 yd (550 m) of the Switch Line. The British bombardment had begun at 7:00 p.m. on 22 July, under the direction of low-flying British artillery-observation aircraft. German sources reported that the shelling was of painful accuracy and prevented the troops in High Wood from being relieved, despite the number of casualties. One battalion lost direction in the wood and had many casualties to machine-gun fire. The second battalion attacked up a dip to the south-west of the wood but was also caught by machine-gun fire from the Intermediate Line; by 3:00 a.m. both battalions were back on the start line having lost 450 casualties.

The Germans in the wood also suffered greatly in the hand-to-hand fighting. III Battalion, Infantry Regiment 165 of the 7th Division and part of I Battalion, Infantry Regiment 62 of the 12th Division, were reinforced from the Switch Line by I Battalion, Infantry Regiment 91, early on 23 July. British gunners had difficulty supporting attacks on High Wood, because they had to fire over Bazentin Ridge. The low elevation of the guns meant that shells skimmed the British trenches, the margin for error was small and numerous complaints were made that British infantry casualties were caused by the British artillery. Worn guns, defective ammunition and inaccurate information about the location of British infantry positions were blamed for short-shooting. The 51st (Highland) Division pushed saps forward on 2 August, towards the Switch Line and dug a new trench near Wood Lane to the east of High Wood.

=== August – 14 September ===
==== August ====
The 33rd Division relieved the 51st (Highland) Division and on 11 August, continued to push sap heads forward towards the Switch line and dug a new trench closer to Wood Lane to the east. Two large flame-throwers and pipe-pushers (devices to force a pipe filled with explosives underground, parallel with the surface, to create a sap when the explosives were detonated) were brought forward, as both sides patrolled the area. On 18 August, a battalion of the 33rd Division attacked the wood, using the flame throwers and thirty oil drums thrown by Livens Projectors but the flame throwers failed and the projectors were buried by British artillery-fire which fell short; the pipe pushers fouled tree roots in the wood and one was deflected backwards, blowing a crater into the trench line of one of the attacking battalions. All attempts by the infantry to advance failed, although some troops broke into the German defences and were ejected by I Battalion, Infantry Regiment 134 and Infantry Regiment 104 recorded many casualties. On 20 August, the division attacked the wood with one battalion, to occupy a trench on the western edge of the wood. On 24 August, three battalions of the 100th Brigade attacked between High Wood and Delville Wood. (Note: A machine gun barrage was fired by the 100th Machine Gun Company (100th Brigade), which in twelve hours fired over 1 million bullets, from ten machine guns.) On the night of 27/28 August, the 1st Division relieved part of the 33rd Division and next day attacked on the east side of the wood, advancing a short distance. The rest of the 33rd Division was relieved by the 24th Division on 31 August. The largest German counter-attack of the Battle of the Somme, took place on the same day to the east of the wood, in the afternoon and evening. Troops of the II Bavarian Corps and XII Corps, pushed one battalion into the eastern side of the wood at Edge Trench.

==== September ====
Weather (1 August – 15 September 1916)
Date	Rain mm	°F	
1	0.0	82°–59°	hot hazy
2	0.0	88°–57°	hot
3	0.0	84°–57°	hot
4	0.0	79°–52°	—
5	0.0	68°–48°	fine
6	0.0	75°–52°	—
7	0.0	73°–50°	—
8	0.0	77°–52°	—
9	0.0	84°–54°	—
10	4.0	70°–55°	dull
11	0.0	77°–59°	mist storm
12	1.0	82°–63°	—
13	0.0	81°–59°	wind
14	2.0	77°–59°	rain
15	0.0	75°–55°	rain
16	2.0	75°–55°	—
17	4.0	72°–54°	rain
18	1.0	70°–55°	dull
19	2.0	70°–50°	dull
20	0.0	72°–54°	dull
21	0.0	72°–48°	—
22	0.0	72°–52°	—
23	0.0	72°–54°	—
24	0.0	78°–55°	—
25	8.0	81°–61°	dull
26	7.0	75°–59°	—
27	4.0	73°–59°	—
28	0.1	73°–59°	rain
29	?	82°–59°	rain
30	8.0	63°–48°	wet mud
31	0.0	70°–52°	fine
1	0.0	72°–52°	—
2	0.0	75°–52°	wind
3	4	72°–50°	—
4	25	66°–52°	rain
5	0.0	63°–54°	dull
6	0.0	70°–52°	dull
7	0.0	70°–54°	fine
8	0.0	70°–55°	fine dull
9	5	75°–57°	—
10	1	68°–57°	dull
11	0.1	66°–54°	dull
12	0.0	72°–55°	fine dull
13	0.0	72°–52°	dull
14	0.0	61°–41°	wind
15	0.0	59°–43°	mist

On 3 September, a 1st Brigade battalion of the 1st Division attacked in High Wood as part of the fighting for Guillemont, making another attempt to use the flame-throwers and Livens Projectors. A 178th Tunnelling Company mine, with 3,000 lb (1,400 kg) of explosives, was sprung under the strong point at the east corner of the wood thirty seconds before the infantry advance. The strong point was overrun by an infantry company and consolidated by an engineer field company. The pipe pushers blew back and a mortar bomb dropped short and set off the oil drums in the Livens Projectors, causing much confusion among the attackers.

Bombers worked towards the western flank but a counter-attack at 3:00 p.m. by Bavarian Infantry Regiment 5 from the Switch Line forced the British back to their start line. At 6:00 p.m. a fresh battalion advanced to the middle of the wood and reached its objective on the right flank but was checked in the left. An attack on the south-west face of the wood also reached the objective and two companies of the 15th (Scottish) Division got into the western corner and repulsed a German counter-attack with Lewis-gun fire. Another counter-attack was defeated at 8:00 p.m. but the British then withdrew, except for one company which retired at 4:00 a.m.

On 8 September, the 1st Division attacked the west end of the wood at 6:00 p.m. with two battalions. The right-hand battalion reached its objective on its right flank, where German troops were found to be in wired shell-craters but not on its left flank. The left-hand battalion attacked the south-west face and reached the objective as a battalion of the 15th (Scottish) Division to the west captured a German trench beyond the west side of the wood. Two German counter-attacks were repulsed but the British were ordered to retire and by midnight were back on their start lines. About fifty prisoners of III Battalion, Bavarian Infantry Regiment 18 of the 3rd Royal Bavarian Division were taken.

The 178th Tunnelling Company reopened the gallery of the mine fired on 3 September and charged it with another 3,000 lb (1,400 kg) of ammonal. On 9 September, the 1st Division attacked High Wood and German positions on the right flank; two battalions captured Wood Lane and two battalions attacked in the wood after the new mine was exploded thirty seconds before zero hour. The crater was occupied but the garrison was then bombed out by the Bavarians after 90 minutes, an advance on the western side also failed. By 14 September, it was estimated that the British had suffered 6,000 casualties in the struggle for High Wood.

=== Battle of Flers–Courcelette, 15 September ===
==== Capture of High Wood ====
On 15 September, the 47th (1/2nd London) Division, which had relieved the 1st Division from 7 to 11 September, attacked the wood and the adjacent areas to the right and left with two brigades, between the New Zealand and 50th divisions. Due to the narrowness of no man's land in and around the wood, the British troops were withdrawn during the preliminary bombardment but then sent forward again and the creeping bombardment was fired 150 yd (140 m) beyond the German front line. The artillery were given the wrong map coordinates, which led to the creeping barrage being fired another 100 yd (91 m) further on; four of the eight tanks allotted to the corps were substituted for a closer creeping bombardment at High Wood. The tanks advanced at 6:20 a.m. and two reached the south of the wood but then turned east to find open ground. Tank D-22 lost direction, ditched in the British front line and then fired on British troops by mistake.

The second tank drove into a shell hole but D-13 got into the wood and fired on Bavarian Infantry Regiment 18 in the German support line, until the tank was hit and set on fire. A German infantryman crept up on the tank and shot one of the crew in the leg through a loophole; the fourth tank broke down in no man's land. The fate of the three tanks was reported at 10:00 a.m. by the crew of a 34 Squadron contact patrol, who then flew back to the wood and saw that the attacks by the New Zealanders and the 50th (Northumbrian) Division had enveloped the wood and the defenders of the Switch Trench nearby. On their return, the crew convinced the III Corps headquarters to cancel an attack from the wood. The infantry advance into the wood had been stopped by machine-gun fire and in the mêlée, part of the three battalions advancing ready to attack the second objective, went into the wood and joined in.

At 11:40 a.m., the 140th Trench Mortar Battery fired a hurricane bombardment of 750 mortar bombs into the wood in fifteen minutes. The 34 Squadron crew made a second sortie and at 12:30 p.m., watched as parties of Germans began to surrender to bombers working forward along the edges of the wood. Several hundred soldiers of Bavarian Infantry Regiment 23 of the 3rd Royal Bavarian Division were taken prisoner, along with six machine-guns and two heavy howitzers and the survivors of the 141st Brigade captured the wood by 1:00 p.m. As night fell, the division had no organised front line, except on the extreme right and only the first objective had been captured, although this gave the British observation of the German defences north-eastwards to Bapaume.

The survivors of Bavarian Infantry Regiment 23 managed to rally beyond Martinpuich and reinforcements from the 50th Reserve Division arrived and then counter-attacked with the remnants of the Bavarians at 5:30 p.m. The Germans managed to advance to within several hundred yards of High Wood and Martinpuich and then dug in. Engineers of the 50th (Northumbrian) Division on the left of the 47th (1/2nd London) Division worked from 16 to 17 September, using bricks from Bazentin-le-Petit to fill shell holes in the road leading to High Wood and dug Boast Trench to link the flanks of both divisions, which had been separated for three days. Tramlines were built west of the wood towards Eaucourt l'Abbaye and later extended to Bazentin-le-Petit, so that the wood could be avoided.

== Aftermath ==
=== Analysis ===
The 47th (1/2nd London) Division was considered to have failed, because High Wood was only the first objective. In four days of fighting, the division had suffered over 4,500 casualties and the 141st Brigade was so depleted that after the occupation of the wood, it was reorganised into a composite battalion. The divisional commander Major-General Charles Barter had urged Lieutenant-General William Pulteney, the III Corps commander, to cancel the attempt to use tanks in the wood as a substitute for artillery but had been over-ruled. The failure of the tanks was considered by the 47th (1/2nd London) Division to have been the main cause of the large number of casualties in the division but Barter was sacked on 28 September, for "wanton waste of men". (Note: Barter was refused an inquiry but was exonerated in an informal investigation, knighted and sent on a mission to Petrograd. His attempts to obtain an official inquiry and public exoneration failed and Barter died on 22 March 1931.)

Peter Liddle wrote that beyond imposing a delay, the German policy of unyielding defence and counter-attack failed and ought to be judged on the same terms as British and French methods. Haig and Joffre were right to believe that a serious German collapse was possible until late July and no convincing alternative to attrition, in the circumstances of late July to early September, has been proposed. Analysis of captured documents and prisoner interrogations indicated the strain being imposed on the German army. William Philpott criticised the weeks of costly, small, narrow-front attacks against a skilful and determined defence by the Germans, yet Gallwitz "had no better tactical method", which reduced operations to a battle of wills. In the Fourth Army area from 15 July to 4 September, 72 German counter-attacks were made against 90 British attacks, exposing German infantry to similar costly and frustrating failures. German artillery and air inferiority was a great disadvantage and led to constant losses.

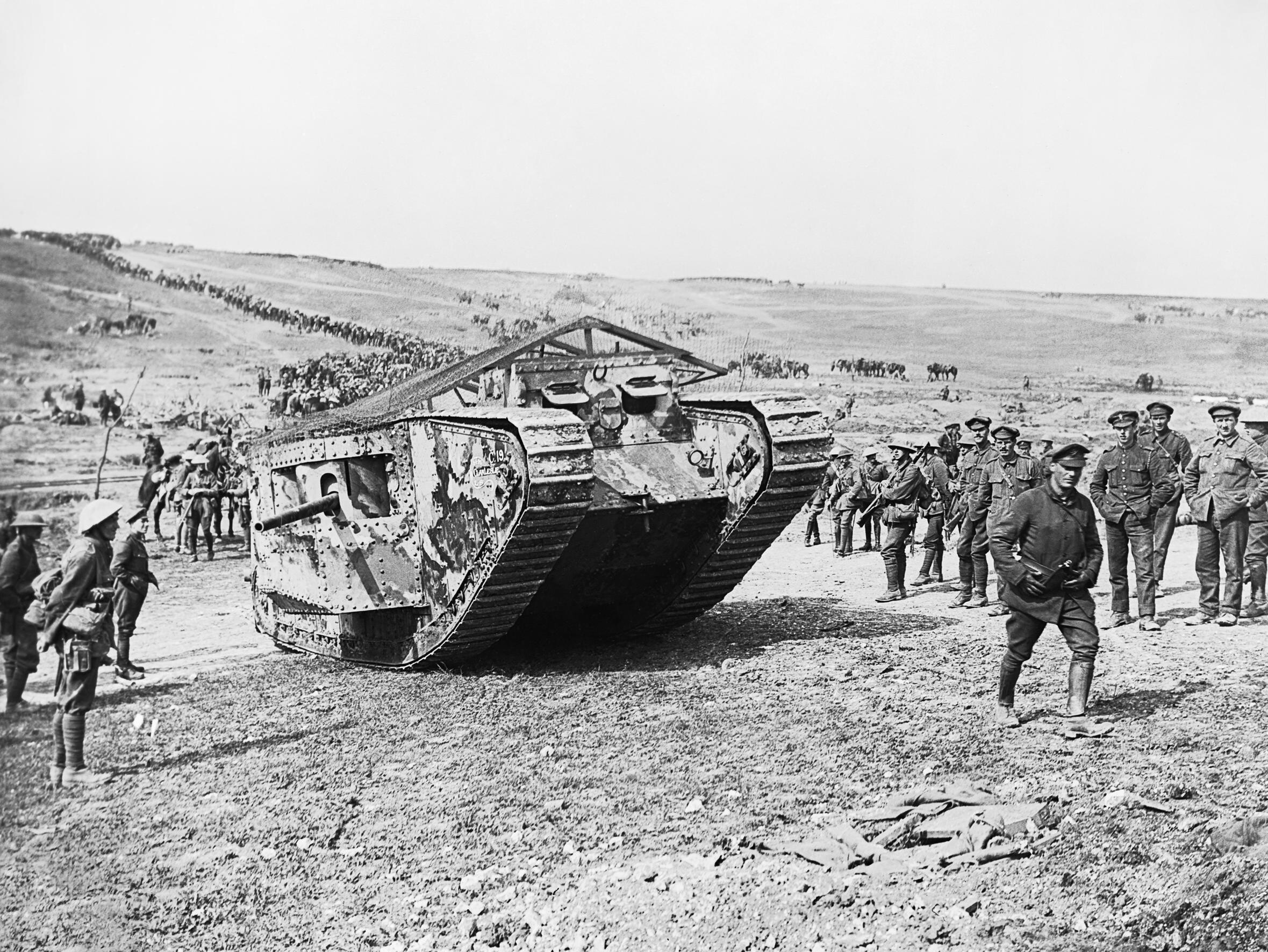
Tank preparing to advance at the Battle of Flers–Courcelette (Imperial War Museum Q 5574)

Sheldon also wrote that Allied aerial dominance in August put the Germans at a serious tactical disadvantage, that some troops began to avoid the remaining dugouts and that much of the Allied artillery was used constantly to bombard targets deep behind German lines. J. P.Harris wrote that on the German side, conditions were worse and the British improved the accuracy of their artillery-fire, with the help of aircraft observation. At the end of August, Falkenhayn was dismissed, partly due to disagreements over his conduct of the defence of the Somme. Prior and Wilson analysed the British on the Somme from 15 July to 12 September, which included the fighting for High Wood. In the first sixty days of the offensive, thirty-two British divisions had engaged and had suffered 126,000 casualties. The British were bogged down, having advanced 1,000–1,500 yd (910–1,370 m) on a 12,000 yd (6.8 mi; 11 km) front.

On fifty days in the period, an average of eight divisions were in the line but fewer than six battalions attacked and only twice were more than half of the battalions in the line engaged simultaneously. British assaults were constant, small and narrow-front, against which the Germans could concentrate artillery, easily to inflict many casualties. British divisions stayed in the front line from 2 to 42 days and casualties varied from 500 per day in the 5th Division to fewer than 100 per day in the 23rd Division. (Note: The tactical need to attack on broad front, to disperse German artillery and machine-gun fire and the practical need to avoid dispersing British fire-power, when so many guns were mechanically defective, ammunition was unreliable, the delivery of shells to gun positions was intermittent and when 50 per cent more ammunition had been fired in July, than had been received from Britain, is not mentioned.) Gary Sheffield wrote that criticism of Haig underestimated the difficulty in balancing tactical, operational and strategic demands; line straightening attacks were costly but were better than imposing complicated manoeuvres on the infantry. (Note: Despite improvisation and inexperience, in 1916 British war industry produced 33,507 machine-guns, 5,192 trench mortars with 6,500,000 rounds, 127,000 long tons (129,000 t) of explosives and 84,000 long tons (85,000 t) of propellants. Mills bomb production rose to 1,400,000 per week and the output of shells rose from 4,336,800 in the first quarter of 1916 to 20,888,400 in the final quarter, for an annual total of more than fifty million. Ammunition expenditure on the Somme totalled 148,000 long tons (150,000 t) from 24 June to 23 July during the receipt of 101,771 long tons (103,404 t) landed in France. Heavy guns and howitzers burst on firing, due to defective shells made from inferior steel, which had more hairline cracks, through which the propellant discharge detonated the shell. 8-inch howitzer fuzes failed so often that the battlefield was littered with duds and an attempted cure made the fuzes fall out. Many shells failed to explode, due to deterioration of the explosive filling and defective fuzes in all heavy guns caused premature detonations, while many guns misfired due to poor quality barrels. 60-pounder guns averaged a premature every 500 shrapnel rounds and 4.5-inch howitzer shells exploded in the barrel or 4–5 yd (3.7–4.6 m) beyond the muzzle, the crews becoming known as "suicide clubs". Some propellants were not fully consumed on firing, requiring the barrel to be cleaned after each shot, which slowed the rate of fire. Some copper driving bands on 18-pounder field gun shells were too hard and reduced the accuracy of the gun and when High Explosive ammunition was introduced late in 1915, premature detonations and bulges occurred with a burst barrel every thousand shots. There was a shortage of spare buffer springs, replacements were sometimes worse than worn ones and spare parts for every mechanical device in the army were lacking. Some shells exuded explosive in the summer heat, flare fillings decomposed, phosphorus bombs went off spontaneously, the firing mechanism of the heavy trench mortars failed on 1 July, Stokes mortar ammunition was chronically unreliable until replaced by improved designs, many Mills bombs went off early, rifle grenades were either premature detonations or duds and a brand of rifle cartridge jammed after firing and had to be scrapped.)

=== Casualties ===
From 11 to 27 July the 1st Division suffered 3,078 casualties and from 14 to 20 July, the 7th Division lost 3,413 casualties. The German 7th and 8th divisions had 9,498 casualties from 15 to 27 July, on the front from Delville Wood to High Wood. From 22 July to 7 August, the 51st (Highland) Division had 2,120 casualties and the 47th (1/2nd London) Division suffered more than 4,500 men from 15 to 19 September. At least 8,000 British and German soldiers died in the wood in 1916.

== Commemoration ==
On the edge of High Wood is the London Cemetery and Extension. This Commonwealth cemetery was opened with the interment of 47 soldiers of the 47th (1/2nd London) Division in the days following 15 September 1916 and extended in 1934. The men were buried in a large shell hole and by 1987, the cemetery contained the remains of 3,870 men, 3,114 of whom have no name. Opposite the cemetery is a 47th (1/2nd London) Division memorial and a cairn for the 9th (Glasgow Highlanders) Highland Light Infantry. A memorial to the Cameron Highlanders and Black Watch lies on the east side of the wood. Memorials to the 1st and 51st divisions, 1st Northumberland Fusiliers, Cameron Highlanders, 1st South Wales Borderers, 10th Glosters and the 20th Royal Fusiliers were also built in the wood; Thistle Dump Cemetery is in a field to the south. High Wood is also mentioned in a poem by Siegfried Sassoon and is the subject of High Wood by P. Johnstone. Ted Hughes describes his uncle Walter (16th King's Royal Rifle Corps) wounded from a German sniper's bullet and lying out in No Man's Land after one of the 33rd Division attacks in Walt - I: Under High Wood. The stench of rotting corpses in the wood was overwhelming and it inspired Ewart MacKintosh to write a parody of Chalk Farm to Camberwell Green.

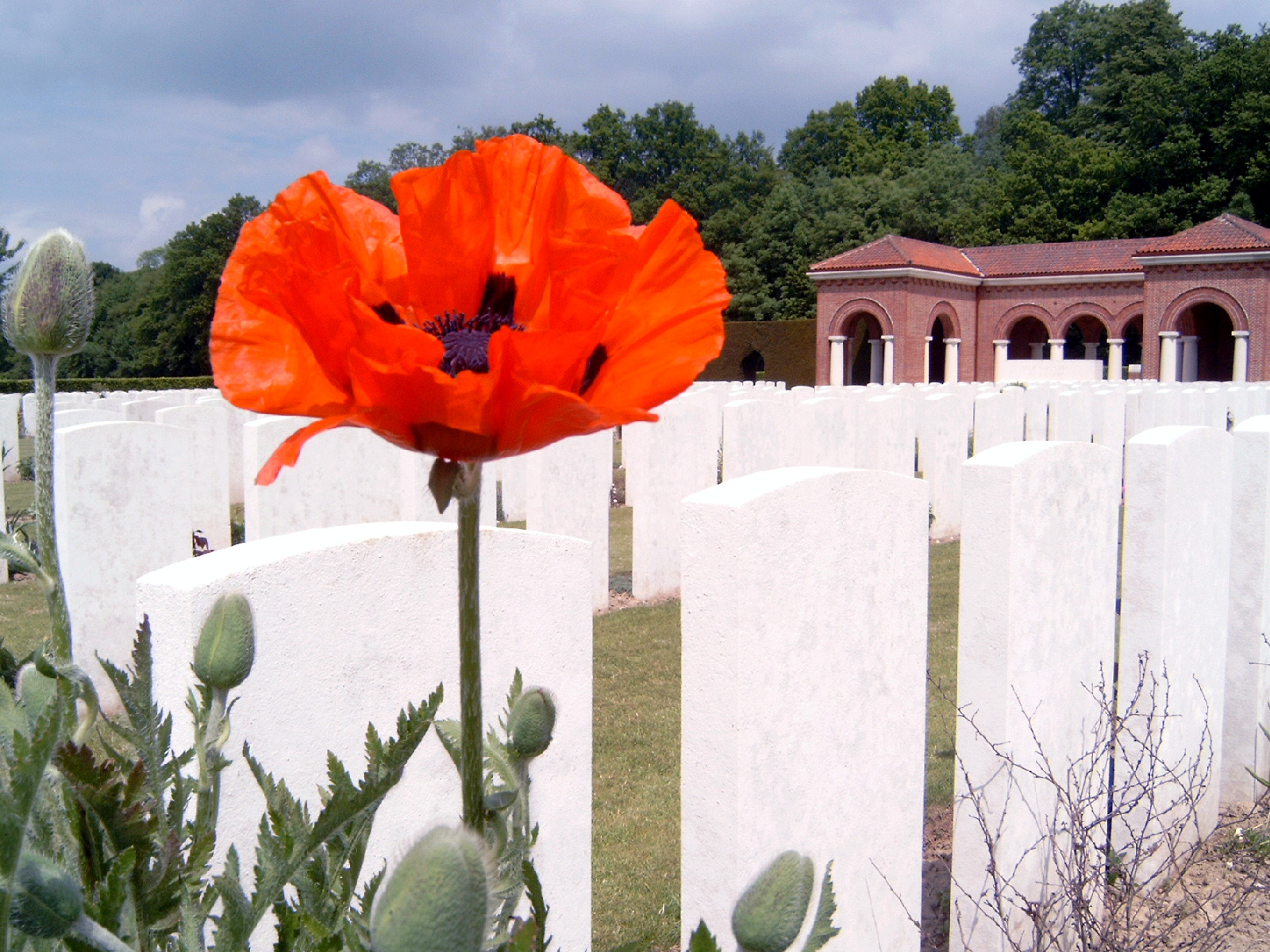
A red poppy in the CWGC London Cemetery, beside High Wood

High Wood to Warterlot Farm
To the tune of "Chalk Farm to Camberwell Green"

There is a wood at the top of a hill,
If it's not shifted it's standing there still;
There is a farm a short distance away,
But I'd not advise you to go there by day,
For the snipers abound, and the shells are not rare,
And a man's only chance is to run like a hare,
So take my advice if you're chancing your arm
From High Wood to Waterlot Farm.

Chorus

High Wood to Waterlot Farm,
All on a summer's day,
Up you get to the top of the trench
Though you're sniped at all the way.
If you've got a smoke helmet there
You'd best put it on if you could,
For the wood down by Waterlot Farm
Is a bloody high wood.
