= Theodore Veale =

English Victoria Cross recipient (1892-1980)

Theodore William Henry Veale
- Born: 11 November 1892; Dartmouth, Devon, England
- Died: 6 November 1980 (aged 87); Hoddesdon, Hertfordshire, England
- Military career
- Allegiance: United Kingdom
- Branch: British Army
- Rank: Corporal
- Service number: 10799
- Units: Devonshire Regiment
- Conflicts: World War I
- Awards: Victoria Cross

Corporal Theodore William Henry Veale VC (11 November 1892 – 6 November 1980) was a British Army soldier and an English recipient of the Victoria Cross (VC), the highest and most prestigious award for gallantry in the face of the enemy that can be awarded to British and Commonwealth forces.

Veale was 23 years old, and a private in the 8th (Service) Battalion, Devonshire Regiment, British Army during the First World War when the following deed took place for which he was awarded the VC.

On 20 July 1916 east of High Wood, France, Private Veale, hearing that a wounded officer (Lt Eric Humphrey Savill) was lying in the open within 50 yards of the enemy, went out and dragged him into a shell hole and then took him water. As he could not carry the officer by himself, he fetched volunteers, one of whom was killed almost at once, and heavy fire necessitated leaving the wounded man in a shell hole until dusk when Private Veale went out again with volunteers. When an enemy patrol approached, he went back for a Lewis gun with which he covered the party while the officer was carried to safety.

He later achieved the rank of corporal. After the war, he married and had children.

His VC is displayed at The Keep Military Museum, Dorchester, Dorset.

He, and Lt Savill, are commemorated by the Veale/Savill Garden in Dartmouth, Veale's home town. The garden contains four magnolias donated by the Savill Garden in Windsor Great Park where Savill worked for the rest of his life.

== Bibliography ==
- Gliddon, Gerald (2011) [1991]. Somme 1916. VCs of the First World War. The History Press. ISBN 978-0-7524-6303-2.
