= Kingston, Sussex =

Kingston, Sussex may refer to:

- Kingston by Ferring, a civil parish in the Arun district of West Sussex
- Kingston by Sea, an area in the Adur district of West Sussex
- Kingston near Lewes, a village and civil parish in the Lewes district of East Sussex

== See also ==
- Kingston Buci, an electoral division of West Sussex County Council
