= John Mackenzie (VC) =

Recipient of the Victoria Cross

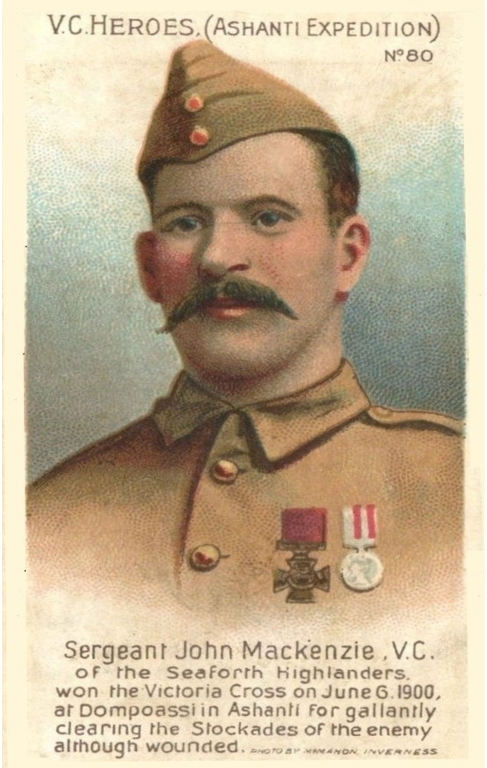
- Born: 22 November 1871; Contin, Ross-shire, Scotland
- Died: 17 May 1915 (aged 43); Festubert, France
- Burial place: Guards Cemetery, Windy Corner, Cuinchy
- Military career
- Allegiance: United Kingdom
- Branch: British Army
- Service years: 1887 – 1915
- Rank: Major
- Units: Seaforth Highlanders; Black Watch (29 Nov 1900 – 1904); Royal Scots (1904); Northern Nigeria Regiment
- Commands: 2nd Battalion, Bedfordshire Regiment
- Conflicts: Chitral Expedition; Third Ashanti Expedition; Aro Expedition; Kano-Sokoto Expedition; World War I †
- Awards: Victoria Cross; Distinguished Conduct Medal

Major John Mackenzie, VC, DCM (22 November 1871 – 17 May 1915) was a Scottish recipient of the Victoria Cross, the highest and most prestigious award for gallantry in the face of the enemy that can be awarded to British and Commonwealth forces.

== Details ==
Mackenzie was 29 years old, and a sergeant in the 2nd Battalion, The Seaforth Highlanders (Ross-shire Buffs, Duke of Albany's), British Army, employed with the West African Field Force during the Third Ashanti Expedition when the following deed took place for which he was awarded the VC.

On 6 June 1900 at Dompoassi, Ashanti (now Ghana), Sergeant Mackenzie, after working two Maxim guns under heavy fire and being wounded while doing so, volunteered to clear the stockade of the enemy. This he did, most gallantly, leading the charge himself and driving the enemy headlong into the bush.

== Further information ==
John Mackenzie enlisted in the Seaforth Highlanders in August 1887, and served with the regiment in India, including the 1895 Chitral Expedition. Promoted corporal in May 1897, he was seconded for service in West Africa in November that year, where he was awarded the Distinguished Conduct Medal. He became a sergeant in March 1899.

John Mackenzie was commissioned as a second lieutenant in the Black Watch on 29 November 1900 and became a captain in the Royal Scots on 22 January 1904. During this time he also served on attachment with the Northern Nigeria Regiment. He was mentioned in dispatches for his work during the Aro Expedition (November 1901 to March 1902); also in 1906 when he was staff officer of the Munster Field Force and once more during the Kano-Sokoto Expedition.

He was promoted to major in April 1914 and was commanding officer of the 2nd Battalion of the Bedfordshire Regiment, where at Festubert on 17 May 1915, when leading his men, he was killed just after he had left the jumping off trench.

Major Mackenzie is buried in the Guards Cemetery, Windy Corner, Cuinchy, in Northern France.

His Victoria Cross is displayed at the Regimental Museum of Queens Own Highlanders, Fort George, Inverness-shire, Scotland. His pipe banner is located in the Royal Scots Museum at Edinburgh Castle.

== Bibliography ==
- Buzzell, Nora, ed. (1997). The Register of the Victoria Cross. Cheltenham, Gloucestershire: This England Alma House. ISBN 0-906324-27-0.
- Harvey, David (2000). Monuments to Courage. Naval & Military Press Ltd. ISBN 1-84342-356-1.
- Ross, Graham (1995). Scotland's Forgotten Valour. MacLean Press. ISBN 978-1899272006.
