= George Gorringe =

British Army general

Lieutenant-General Sir George Gorringe KCB KCMG DSO
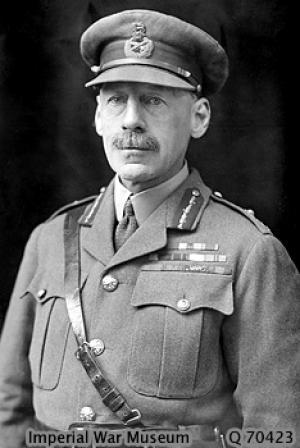
- Born: 10 February 1868; Kingston by Sea, England
- Died: 24 October 1945 (aged 77); Kingston by Sea
- Military career
- Allegiance: United Kingdom
- Branch: British Army
- Service years: 1888–1924
- Rank: Lieutenant General
- Nickname: Bloody Orange
- Unit: Royal Engineers
- Commands: 18th Infantry Brigade; 12th Indian Division; 3rd Indian Army Corps; 47th (1/2nd London) Division; 10th (Irish) Division
- Conflicts: Mahdist War; Second Boer War; First World War
- Awards: Knight Commander of the Order of the Bath; Knight Commander of the Order of St Michael and St George; Distinguished Service Order
- Other work: Farming

Lieutenant General Sir George Frederick Gorringe, KCB, KCMG, DSO (10 February 1868 – 24 October 1945) served as an active field commander in the British Army during the Anglo-Boer War and the First World War, on the Palestine and Western Fronts.

== Early life ==
George Frederick Gorringe was the second son of Hugh and Louisa Gorringe of Kingston-by-Sea, and was born on 10 February 1868.

He was educated at Lee's School Brighton, and Wellington College. In 1886, he passed into the Royal Military Academy, Woolwich, and obtained his commission in the Royal Engineers (RE) on 17 February 1888.

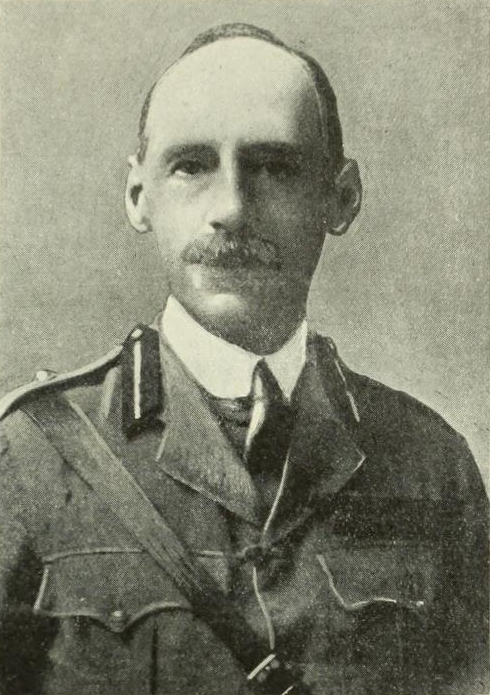
Gorringe in about 1917

== Early military career ==
Gorringe initially served at Chatham, Kent, and Aldershot, and was promoted to lieutenant on 17 February 1891. He was attached to the Egyptian Army in 1892-1899 and served with the Dongola Expedition of 1896 and with the Nile Expeditions of 1897–1899. He was promoted to captain on 17 February 1899, and brevet major the following day. In late November 1899 he commanded a battalion of irregular Sudanese troops during the operations leading to the defeat of the Khalifa (mentioned in despatches 25 November 1899), and for his services in the Sudan he received the brevet rank of lieutenant colonel on 14 March 1900. He then served in the South African War of 1899–1901, and was in November 1900 appointed a Companion of the Order of St Michael and St George (CMG) for his services.

Gorringe again served in the Egyptian Army in the Sudan 1902–1904. He had been promoted to brevet colonel in February 1904. In June 1906, now back in Britain, he was sent to the War Office in London to take over from Brigadier General Henry Lawson the position of director of movements and quartering and receiving a promotion to substantive colonel. He was also promoted to temporary brigadier general on the same date. In April 1909 he relinquished this assignment and took command of the 18th Infantry Brigade.

In September 1911, at the age of 43, he was promoted to the rank of major general. On 1 May 1912 he became general officer commanding (GOC) of a brigade in India. In June he was created a Companion of the Order of the Bath (CB) in the 1912 Birthday Honours.

== First World War ==
Knighted in 1915, his distinguished service during the First World War included command of the 3rd Indian Army Corps during operations up the Tigris in March to July 1916, and of the 47th (1/2nd London) Division in France in September 1916 to March 1919.

In his despatch, to the Chief of the General Staff at British Indian Army Headquarters in Simla, on the operations in Mesopotamia from 19 January to 30 April 1916, Lt-Genl Sir Percy Lake, KCB reported the following:

"Major-General (temporary Lieut.-General) Sir G. F. Gorringe has rendered valuable service to the State. As Chief of the Staff to the Tigris Column from 28 January, and in command of the Column from 12 March onwards, he has shown untiring energy, ability and devotion in dealing with the many difficult situations which he had to face. He is a Commander of proved ability in the field."

== Post war years ==
After the war, he commanded the 10th (Irish) Division in Egypt from 1919 to 1921, rising to the substantive rank of lieutenant general in August 1921. He served as GOC of a division of the Territorial Force (TF) in December 1921 before he retired from the army on 18 December 1924.

Gorringe acted as colonel commandant of the RE from 1927 to 1938.

== Execution of H. J. van Heerden ==
On 2 March 1901, Gorringe, as a lieutenant-colonel, formed a military court on the farm Riet Valley, near Middelburg, Cape Colony to try, in absentia, Hendrik Jacobus van Heerden. The president of the court was Captain CE Wilson of the East Lancashire Regiment. Van Heerden was executed by firing squad shortly after the court had reached its decision.

Following the execution, Gorringe made the following statement:

"After the above Court had been held and the column I command were on the march towards Pearston I received by rider Lt Kirby's report. He was so badly wounded he could not attend. This report strictly confirmed Van Heerden's guilt and treachery and I caused it necessary to make a summary example on the spot. I could not wait for confirmation from higher authority as it was imperative that the enemy, then on the march to Pearston should be followed up without delay. I therefore confirmed the sentence which I ordered to be carried out without delay. I detached a squadron for that purpose."

== Nickname ==
His nickname, Bloody Orange is rhyming slang. It was said to be appropriate for the commander of a division of London Territorials and also fitted his rude and unpleasant personality.

== Later life ==
He lived and farmed at Kingston by Sea until his death on 24 October 1945. He was buried in the family plot in the north-west corner of St Julian's churchyard. St Julian's is now part of Shoreham-by-Sea.

== See also ==
Siege of Kut

== Bibliography ==
- Davies, Frank; Maddocks, Graham (2014) [1995]. Bloody Red Tabs: General Officer Casualties of the Great War 1914–1918. Barnsley, South Yorkshire: Pen and Sword Books. ISBN 978-1-78346-237-7.

Military offices
Preceded by Sir Charles Barter	GOC 47th (1/2nd London) Division; 1916–1919	Succeeded by Sir Nevill Smyth
Preceded by John Longley	GOC 10th (Irish) Division; 1919−1921	Succeeded by Division disbanded
