= Windy Corner =

Windy Corner may refer to

- Windy Corner, Cuinchy, a road junction in the British line in WW1 which is now a cemetery
- Windy Corner, Isle of Man, a named corner in the Isle of Man TT motorcycle racing course
- Windy Corner, Jutland, a phase in the Battle of Jutland when the British Grand Fleet executed complex manoeuvres
- Windy Corner, the house in which the female protagonist lives in E.M. Forster's A Room with a View
