= Michael Chappell =

English writer and historian (1934–2020)

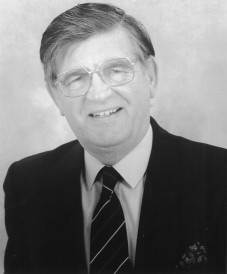
- Mike Chappell in 2007
- Born: 14 September 1934
- Died: 10 August 2020 (aged 85)
- Other names: Mike Chappell (as writer and illustrator)
- Occupations: Military historian and illustrator

Michael John William Chappell BEM (14 September 1934 – 10 August 2020), better known as Mike Chappell, was an English military historian and illustrator of military books.

== Early life and education ==
Chappell came from an Aldershot family with links to the British Army going back several generations. His maternal grandfather, Pte George Green was among a group of soldiers of the Royal Welch Fusiliers killed in France on 14 September 1915 while laying a signal line to an outpost; he is buried in the Guards Cemetery at Windy Corner near Cuinchy. Mike Chappell's late parents were Samuel Chappell (a Warrant Officer in the Royal Army Service Corps) and Kathleen (née Green). His siblings are Anthony Chappell (born 1936), who served in the Royal Corps of Signals; Anna Chappell (born 1940), and Russell Chappell (born 1944).

As a boy, he attended St. Joseph's Roman Catholic School in Aldershot, the Army School at Blackdown in Hampshire, and Guildford Technical College.

== Career ==
=== Military career ===
After leaving school, Chappell briefly served an industrial blacksmith apprenticeship with 13 Command Workshop REME. However, finding this not to his liking, in 1952, at age 17, he enlisted as a private in the Royal Hampshire Regiment, a British Army line-infantry regiment, and in 1955, transferred to the Gloucestershire Regiment, another British Army infantry regiment. During his 22-year military career he saw service in Cyprus, Germany, Libya, Malaya, Swaziland, Ulster and various British garrisons.

He retired in 1974 as a Regimental Sergeant Major of the 1st Battalion (Rifle Volunteers) of the Wessex Regiment, a British Army Territorial Army infantry regiment.

=== Writing and illustrating career ===
Book illustrated by Chappell

He first began painting military subjects for his own interest in 1968, turning professional when he left the army. His many years of military service actually wearing the kit and using the weapons gave him a unique insight in his illustrations. Consequently, Chappell gained worldwide popularity as a military illustrator, having written and illustrated over 100 books, many for Osprey Publishing.

A number of his original artworks are held in the Glenn Christodoulou Collection.

== Personal life ==
Formerly a resident of Aldershot, Chappell lived in the village of Malras in France with his second wife, Marilyn until his death in August 2020. His marriage to his first wife, Edna, was dissolved. He was awarded the British Empire Medal in the Queen's Birthday Honours List on 15 June 2013.

== Osprey books written and/or illustrated by Chappell ==
- Japanese Paratroop Forces of World War II
- The British Army in World War I (1) The Western Front 1914–16
- The British Army in World War I (2) The Western Front 1916–18
- The British Army in World War I (3) The Eastern Fronts
- British Tommy 1914–18
- The Guards Divisions 1914–45
- World War II Infantry Tactics Squad and Platoon
- Wellington's Peninsula Regiments (2) The Light Infantry
- Wellington's Peninsula Regiments (1) The Irish
- Luftwaffe Air & Ground Crew 1939–45
- The British Army 1939–45 (1) North-West Europe
- The British Army 1939–45 (2) Middle East & Mediterranean
- The British Army 1939–45 (3) The Far East
- British Cavalry Equipments 1800–1941
- Axis Cavalry in World War II
- The Indian Army 1914–1947
- The US Army in World War II (1) The Pacific
- The US Army in World War II (2) The Mediterranean
- The US Army in World War II (3) Northwest Europe
- US Paratrooper 1941–45
- The King's German Legion (1) 1803–12
- The King's German Legion (2) 1812–16
- British Infantry Equipments (1) 1808–1908
- British Infantry Equipments (2) 1908–2000
- French Foreign Legion 1914–45
- French Foreign Legion Infantry and Cavalry since 1945
- The French Indochina War 1946–54
- The French Army 1939–45 (1)
- The French Army 1939–45 (2)
- The Algerian War 1954–62
- Redcaps: Britain's Military Police
- Junkers Ju 87 Stukageschwader 1937–41
- Panzerkampfwagen III Medium Tank 1936–44
- Army Commandos 1940–45
- Focke-Wulf Fw 190 Aces of the Russian Front
- US Marine Corps 1941–45
- Scottish Divisions in the World Wars
- International Brigades in Spain 1936–39
- The Gurkhas
- 18th-Century Highlanders
- Churchill Infantry Tank 1941–51
- Security Forces in Northern Ireland 1969–92
- British Battledress 1937–61
- Napoleon's Italian Troops
- British Territorial Units 1914–18
- The War in Cambodia 1970–75
- The British Army in the 1980s
- British Battle Insignia (1) 1914–18
- British Battle Insignia (2) 1939–45
- Modern African Wars (1) Rhodesia 1965–80
- The Korean War 1950–53
- The Canadian Army at War
- Armies of the Vietnam War 1962–75
- Armies of the Vietnam War (2)
- Partisan Warfare 1941–45
- German Airborne Troops 1939–45
- British Cavalry Equipments 1800–1941
- Germany's Eastern Front Allies 1941–45
- Battle for the Falklands (1) Land Forces
- The Israeli Army in the Middle East Wars 1948–73
- Arab Armies of the Middle East Wars 1948–73
- The Malayan Campaign 1948–60
- The Australian Army at War 1899–1975
- British Guards Armoured Division 1941–45
- Allied Tank Destroyers
- The Lee / Grant Tanks in British Service
- The Australian Army in World War I

== Other books by Chappell ==
- The Somme 1916 Crucible of a British Army Windrow & Greene (1995) ISBN 1859150071
- The British Soldier in the 20th Century 2: Field Service Head Dress 1902 to the present day Wessex Military Publishing (1987) ISBN 1870498011

== See also ==
- List of English writers
- List of historians
- List of illustrators
