= Charles Barter (British Army officer) =

British Army general

Lieutenant-General Sir Charles Barter KCB KCMG CVO
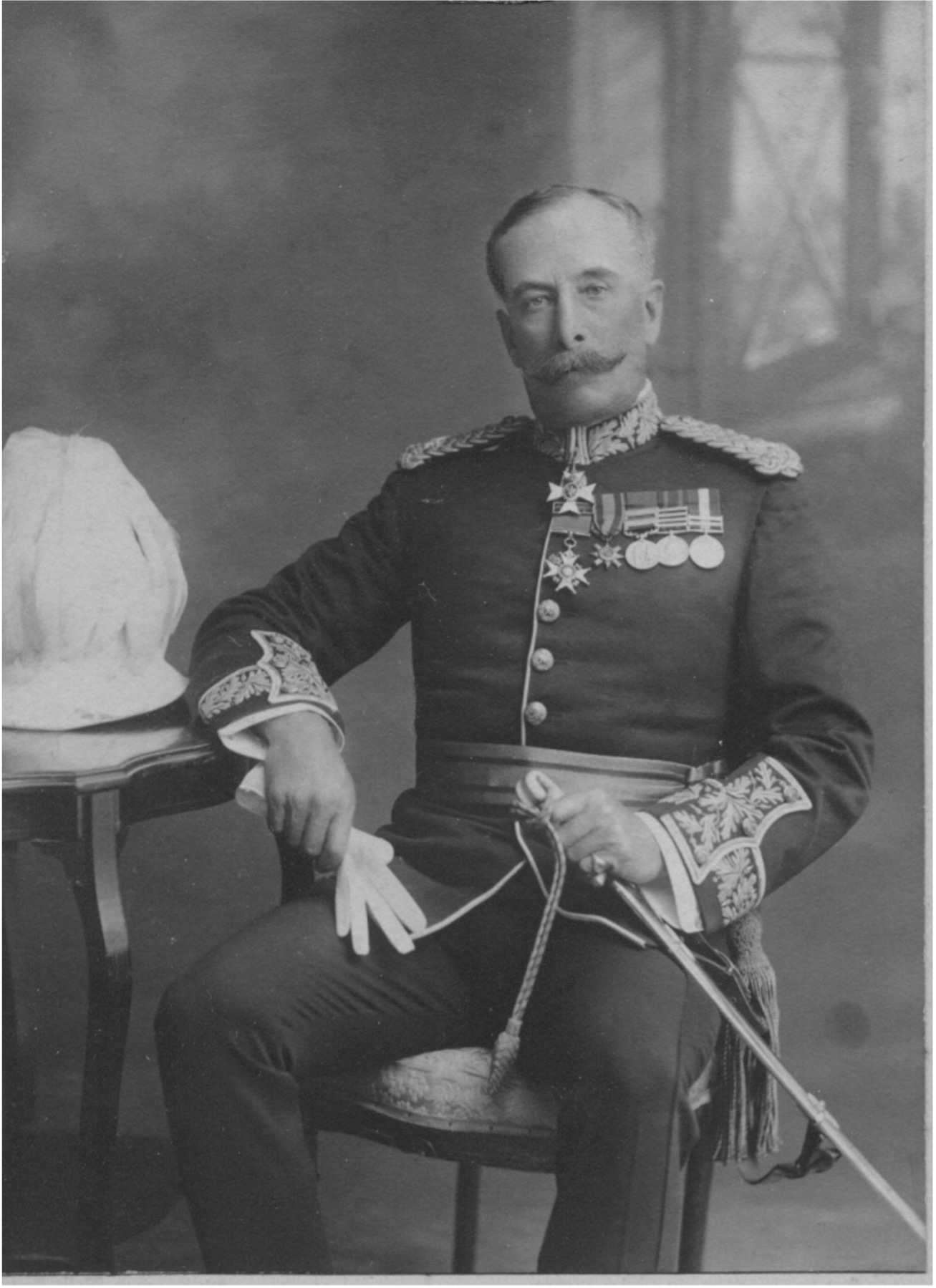
- Born: 1857
- Died: 1931 (aged 73–74)
- Military career
- Allegiance: United Kingdom
- Branch: British Army
- Service years: 1875–1918
- Rank: Lieutenant-General
- Commands: 47th (1/2nd London) Division; Poona Brigade
- Conflicts: Fourth Ashanti War; Tirah campaign Second Boer War; First World War
- Awards: Knight Commander of the Order of the Bath; Knight Commander of the Order of St Michael and St George; Commander of the Royal Victorian Order

Lieutenant-General Sir Charles St Leger Barter, KCB, KCMG, CVO (1857–1931) was a career British Army officer.

== Early life ==
Charles Barter, born in 1857, was the son of the Reverend J. T. Barter of Bercham, County Cork.

== Early military career ==
A graduate of the Royal Military College, Sandhurst, he began his military career with a commission in the 105th Foot in 1875. Later, after attending the Staff College, Camberley in 1883, he served in several military campaigns including the Fourth Ashanti War and the Tirah campaign. In January 1884 he was appointed an instructor at the Royal Military College, Sandhurst having been seconded from his regiment.

On 26 April 1891 he moved from being a staff captain at headquarters to being a deputy assistant adjutant general (DAAG) at headquarters.

From 1899 to 1902 Barter was in command of the 2nd Battalion of the King's Own Yorkshire Light Infantry, serving in South Africa during the Second Boer War. The battalion served with General Bruce Hamilton in the Transvaal during the later stages of the war, and he was in command at Ermelo in March 1902. After the war had ended in May 1902, Barter resigned his command of the battalion and was placed on half-pay with a brevet promotion to colonel on 19 July 1902, leaving Cape Town for Southampton the following month. For his service, Barter was appointed a Companion of the Order of the Bath in the April 1901 South Africa Honours list (the award was dated to 29 November 1900), and he received the actual decoration after his return, from King Edward VII at Buckingham Palace on 24 October 1902.

Following his return, Barter was on 6 September 1902 appointed assistant adjutant general of the Thames District, based at Chatham, Kent, with the substantive rank of colonel.

In June 1905 he was made an assistant quartermaster general. After serving on the half-pay list, he became general officer commanding (GOC) of the Poona Brigade in June 1909 and was granted the temporary rank of brigadier general while employed in this role. He was promoted to major general on 14 August that year.

== First World War ==
He was GOC of the 47th (1/2nd London) Division of the Territorial Force (TF) on 3 September 1914, shortly after the outbreak of the First World War, taking over from Major General Thomas Morland.

He led the division to the Western Front to join the British Expeditionary Force (BEF) in March 1915 and by May the division was fighting at Aubers Ridge.

Barter, who was appointed a Knight Commander of the Order of the Bath in January 1916, and the 47th Division continued fighting on the Western Front and participated in the Battle of the Somme later that year. It was during action at the Somme that the 47th Division and Barter were involved in the battle for High Wood. Shortly after the capture of High Wood, Barter was relieved of his command. For the remainder of his life, Barter attempted to have an official enquiry into his dismissal but was unsuccessful.

After being promoted to temporary lieutenant general while specially employed, on 6 May 1917, became a Knight Commander of the Order of St Michael and St George (KCMG) in January 1918 for his service. On 21 September 1918 he relinquished his temporary rank and reverted to his substantive rank of major general.

== Post-war ==
He retired from the army on 20 December 1918 and was granted the honorary rank of lieutenant general.

Military offices
Preceded by Thomas Morland	GOC 47th (1/2nd London) Division; 1914–1916	Succeeded by George Gorringe
