= 47th (1/2nd London) Division =

WWI British infantry division

2nd London Division 47th (1/2nd London) Division 47th (2nd London) Infantry Division
- Insignia of the 47th (1/2nd London) Division, First World War.
- Active: 1908–1919; 1920–1936
- Country: United Kingdom
- Branch: British Army
- Type: Infantry
- Size: Division
- Peacetime HQ: Duke of York's Headquarters
- Engagements: First World War Second Battle of Ypres 1915 Battle of the Somme 1916 Battle of Arras 1917 Third Battle of Ypres 1917

The 47th (1/2nd London) Division was an infantry division of the British Army, raised in 1908 as part of the Territorial Force.

== Formation ==
The Territorial Force (TF) was formed on 1 April 1908 following the enactment of the Territorial and Reserve Forces Act 1907 (7 Edw.7, c.9) which combined and re-organised the old Volunteer Force, the Honourable Artillery Company and the Yeomanry. On formation, the TF contained 14 infantry divisions and 14 mounted yeomanry brigades. One of the divisions was the 2nd London Division. In peacetime, the divisional headquarters was, from 1912, in the Duke of York's Headquarters.

== First World War ==
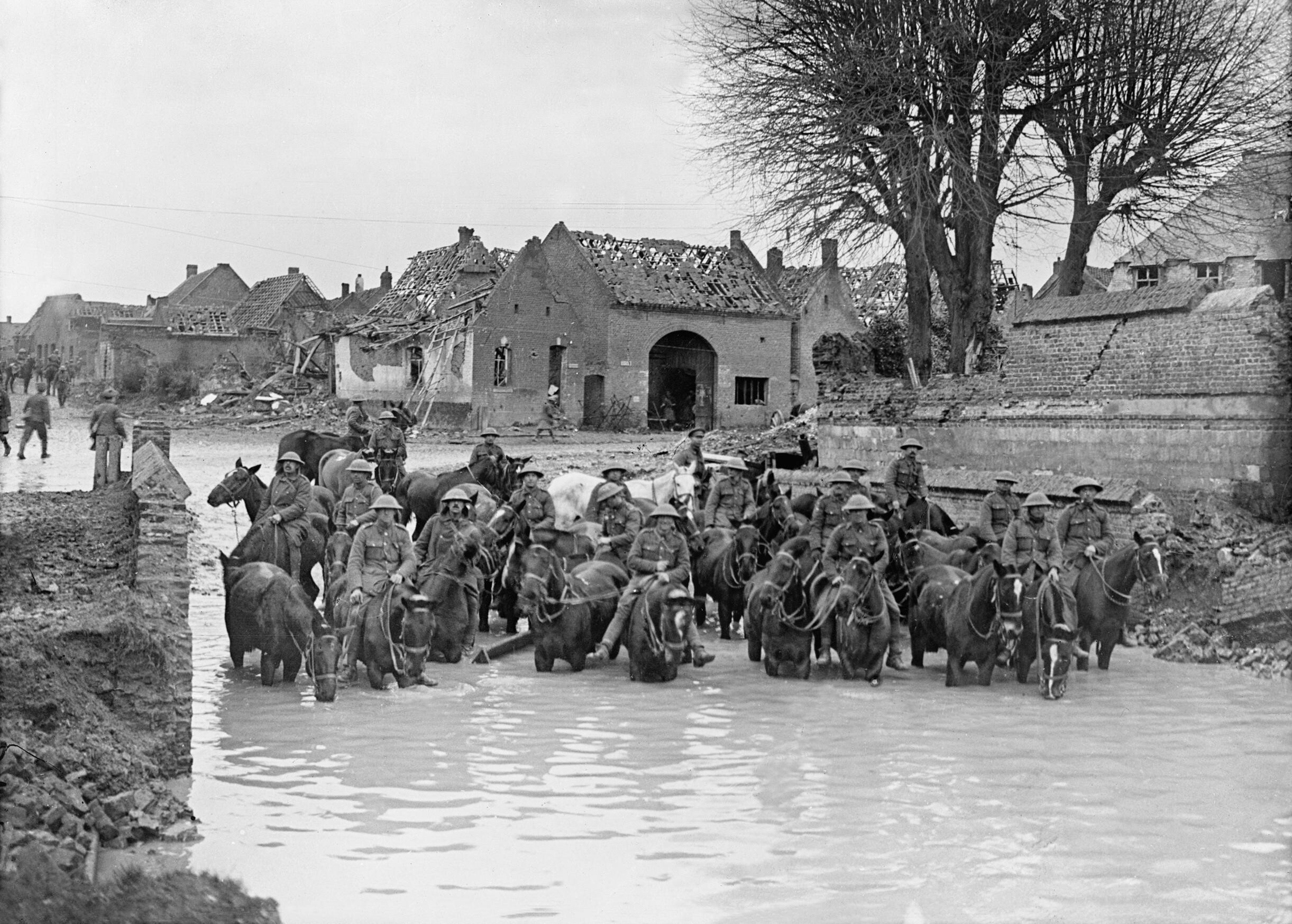
Drivers from CCXXXV Brigade RFA water their horses near Flesquières 24 November 1917 during the Battle of Cambrai.

The 2nd London Division was designated the 47th Division in 1915, during the Great War, and referred to as the "1/2nd London Division" after the raising of the second-line 60th (2/2nd London) Division.

After undergoing a period of training, the division was sent to France in March 1915, the second complete Territorial division (after the 46th (North Midland) Division) to enter the fighting, to do so, and served on the Western Front for the duration of the war.

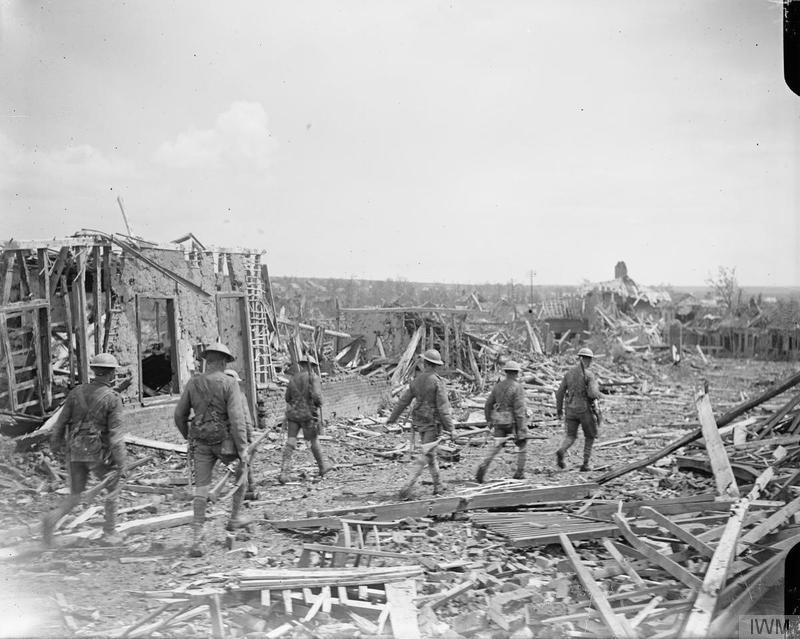
Daylight patrol of the 18th Battalion, London Regiment (London Irish Rifles) entering Albert, France, 6 August 1918. Of the patrol of seven, one was killed and three were wounded.

In early 1916 the division was part of IV Corps (Lieutenant General Sir Henry Wilson). Wilson was not impressed by Charles Barter, the 47th's divisional general officer commanding (GOC), and at the end of March 1916 he and his superior, General Sir Charles Monro (GOC First Army and a former GOC of the 2nd London Division), discussed getting rid of him, but could not come up with a reason for doing so; Barter survived until he was relieved during the Battle of the Somme later in the year and replaced by Major General G. F. Gorringe.

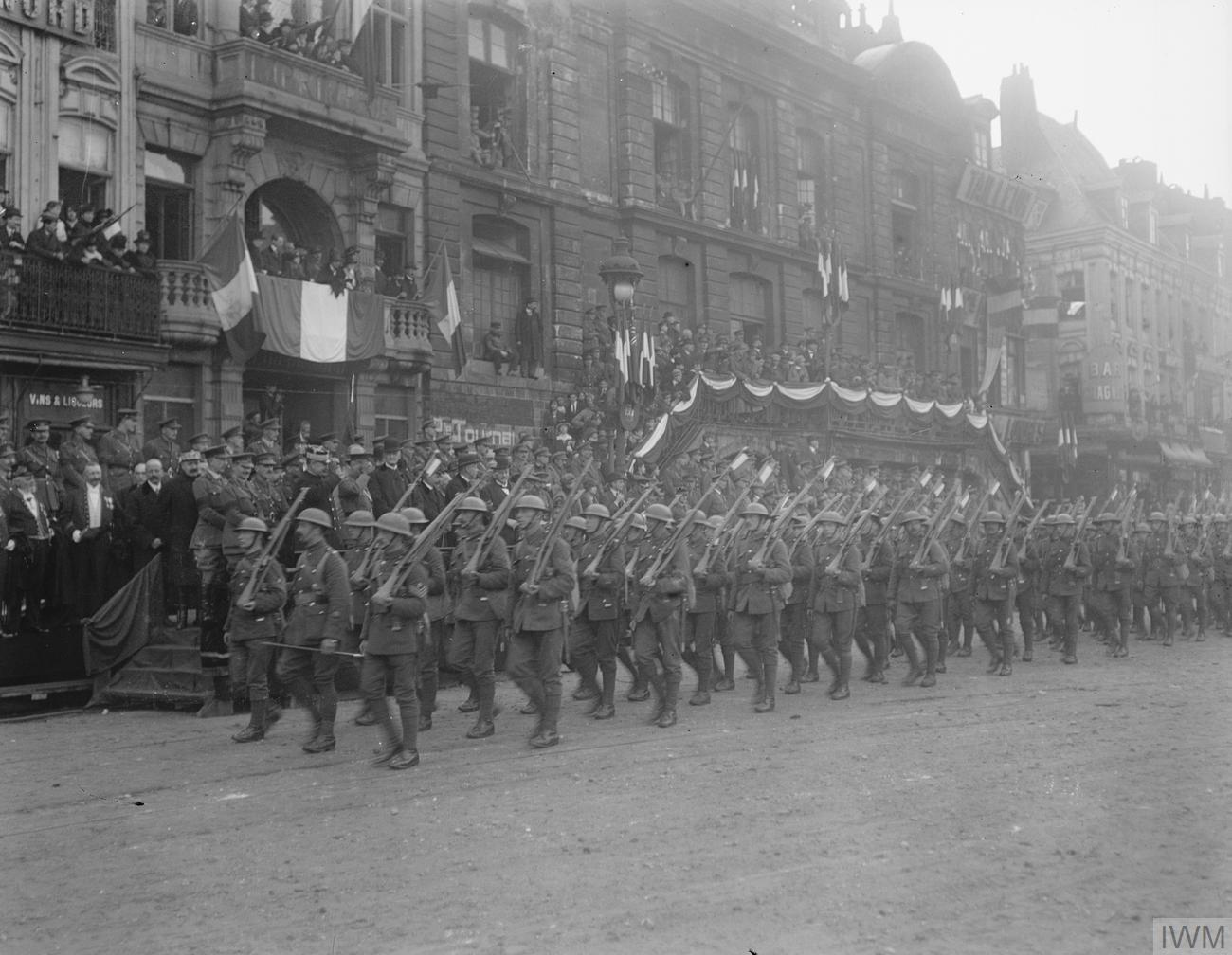
The march past of the 47th Division in the Grande Place, 28 October 1918.

The 47th Division conducted effective mining operations against Vimy Ridge on 3 and 15 May 1916, but a German attack on the evening of Sunday 21 May moved forward 800 yd (730 m), capturing 1,000 yd (910 m) of the British front line, and the division performed badly during a counter-attack on 23 May. The 47th Division conducted a carefully planned battalion raid on the night of 27/28 June, claiming to have killed 300–600 Germans for only 13 British casualties.

The division fought in the Battle of Aubers Ridge, the Battle of Festubert, the Battle of Loos, the 1 July 1916 Battle of the Somme, including the Battle of Flers-Courcelette and the capture of High Wood.

After mid-1916 battles included the Battle of Le Transloy, the Battle of Messines, and the Battle of Cambrai, both of which took place in 1917.

In the final stages of the war, during the Hundred Days Offensive, the division's GSO1 (or chief of staff) was the thirty-year old Lieutenant Colonel Bernard Montgomery, who later rose to become a field marshal in the next world war over twenty years later l.

== Order of battle ==
The composition of the division was as follows:

140th (4th London) Brigade

Pre-war the brigade comprised the following battalions:

- 13th (County of London) Battalion, London Regiment (Kensington)
- 14th (County of London) Battalion, London Regiment (London Scottish)
- 15th (County of London) Battalion, London Regiment (Civil Service Rifles)
- 16th (County of London) Battalion, London Regiment (Queen's Westminsters)

After it landed in France it had the following composition:

- 1/6th (City of London) Battalion, London Regiment (City of London Rifles)
- 1/7th (City of London) Battalion, London Regiment
- 1/8th (City of London) Battalion, London Regiment (Post Office Rifles)
- 1/15th (County of London) Battalion, London Regiment (Civil Service Rifles)
- 1/4th (City of London) Battalion, London Regiment (Royal Fusiliers) (from 15 November 1915 until 9 February 1916)
- 140th Brigade Machine Gun Company, Machine Gun Corps (from 13 December 1915 until 1 March 1918)
- 140th Brigade Trench Mortar Battery (from 12 June 1916)

From February 1918, the brigade comprised the following battalions:

- 1/15th (County of London) Battalion, London Regiment
- 1/17th (County of London) Battalion, London Regiment (from 141 Brigade)
- 1/21st (County of London) Battalion, London Regiment (First Surrey Rifles) (from 142 Bde)
- 140th Brigade Trench Mortar Battery

141st (5th London) Brigade

- 1/17th (County of London) Battalion, London Regiment (to 140 Bde February 1918)
- 1/18th (County of London) Battalion, London Regiment (London Irish Rifles)
- 1/19th (County of London) Battalion, London Regiment (St Pancras)
- 1/20th (County of London) Battalion, London Regiment (Blackheath and Woolwich)
- 141st Brigade Machine Gun Company, Machine Gun Corps (from 12 December 1915 until 1 March 1918)
- 141st Brigade Trench Mortar Battery (from 12 June 1916)

142nd (6th London) Brigade

- 1/21st (County of London) Battalion, London Regiment (First Surrey Rifles) (to 140 Brigade February 1918)
- 1/22nd (County of London) Battalion, London Regiment (Queen's)
- 1/23rd (County of London) Battalion, London Regiment
- 1/24th (County of London) Battalion, London Regiment (Queen's)
- 1/4th (City of London) Battalion, London Regiment (Royal Fusiliers) (from 16 November 1915 until 9 February 1916)
- 142nd Brigade Machine Gun Company, Machine Gun Corps (from 10 December 1915 until 1 March 1918)
- 142nd Brigade Trench Mortar Battery (from 12 June 1916)

Pioneers

- 1/4th (Denbighshire) Battalion, Royal Welch Fusiliers (joined 1 September 1915)

Machine Guns

- 239th Machine Gun Company, Machine Gun Corps (from 17 July until 1 October 1917)
- 255th Machine Gun Company, Machine Gun Corps (from 19 November 1917 until 1 March 1918)
- No. 47 Battalion, Machine Gun Corps (from 1 March 1918)
  - 140th, 141st, 142nd, 255th Machine Gun Companies

Mounted Troops

- C Squadron 1st King Edward's Horse (from 25 April 1915 until 1 June 1916)
- 2nd London Divisional Cyclist Company (until 1 June 1916)

Royal Artillery

- 1/V London Brigade, Royal Field Artillery (later CCXXXV Brigade)
- 1/VI London Brigade, Royal Field Artillery (later CCXXXVI Brigade)
- 1/VII London Brigade, Royal Field Artillery (later CCXXXVII Brigade) (broken up among the other brigades 29 November 1916)
- 1/VIII London (Howitzer) Brigade, Royal Field Artillery (later CCXXXVIII Brigade) (until 27 November 1916)
- 2nd London Heavy Battery, Royal Garrison Artillery (until 31 March 1915)
- 2nd London Divisional Ammunition Column
- No 7 (later X.47) Medium Trench Mortar Company (from 17 November 1915)
- No 8 (later Y.47) Medium Trench Mortar Company (from 17 November 1915)
- Z.47 Medium Trench Mortar Company (from April 1916)
- V.47 Heavy Trench Mortar Company (from 6 November 1916 to 16 February 1918)

(1st London Divisional Artillery also served with the division in January and February 1916)

47th (1/2nd London) Divisional Engineers

- 1/3rd London Field Company, Royal Engineers (517th (1/3rd London) from 1 February 1917)
- 1/4th London Field Company, Royal Engineers (518th (1/4th London) from 1 February 1917)
- 2/3rd London Field Company, Royal Engineers (joined 25 June 1915; 520th (2/3rd London) from 1 February 1917)
- 2nd London Divisional Signal Company, Royal Engineers (47th (1/2nd London) Signal Company from 1915)

Medical

- 4th London Field Ambulance, Royal Army Medical Corps
- 5th London Field Ambulance, Royal Army Medical Corps
- 6th London Field Ambulance, Royal Army Medical Corps
- 2nd London Sanitary Section (until 18 April 1917)
- 2nd London Divisional Ambulance Workshop (to Divisional Train 3 April 1916)
- 2nd London Mobile Veterinary Section, Army Veterinary Corps

Transport

- 2nd London Divisional Transport and Supply Column, Army Service Corps
  - 2nd London Divisional Company (HQ) (became 455 Company, ASC, 23 April 1915)
  - 4th London Brigade Company (became 456 Company, ASC, 23 April 1915)
  - 5th London Brigade Company (became 457 Company, ASC, 23 April 1915)
  - 6th London Brigade Company (became 458 Company, ASC, 23 April 1915)

Labour

- 241st Divisional Employment Company (from May 1917)

== Postwar ==
The division was reformed in 1920. By 1935 the increasing need for anti-aircraft (AA) defence, particularly for London, was addressed by converting the 47th Division into the 1st Anti-Aircraft Division.

== Second World War ==
During the Second World War, the division was once again raised, this time as a duplicate of the 1st London Division, initially as the 2nd London Division, but was redesignated in November 1940 as the 47th (London) Infantry Division.

== Commanders ==
The following officers commanded 47th Division throughout its existence:

Appointed	General officer commanding (GOC)
March 1908	Major-General Vesey J. Dawson
31 March 1912	Major-General Charles C. Monro
5 August 1914	Major-General Thomas L. N. Morland
3 September 1914	Major-General Charles St. L. Barter
28 September 1916	Brigadier-General W. H. Greenly (temporary)
2 October 1916	Major-General Sir George F. Gorringe
14 October 1917	Brigadier-General R. McDouall (acting)
26 October 1917	Brigadier-General J. F. Erskine (acting)
5 November 1917	Major-General Sir George F. Gorringe
July 1919	Major-General Sir Nevill M. Smyth
July 1923	Lieutenant-General Sir William Thwaites
January 1927	Major-General Leopold C.L. Oldfield
January 1931	Major-General Richard D. F. Oldman
January 1935	Major-General Clive G. Liddell

== Memorial ==
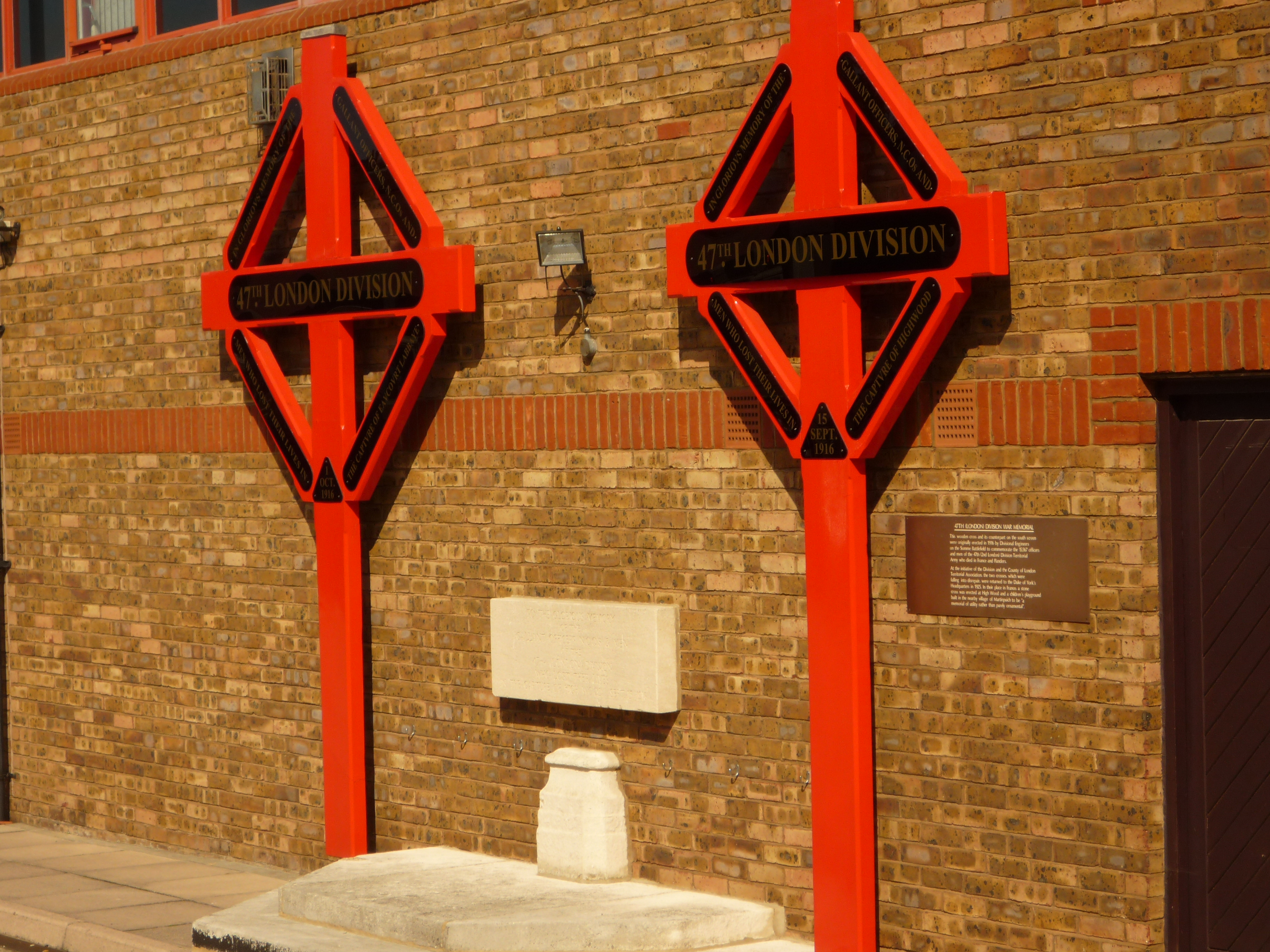
The two wooden memorial crosses were originally erected at High Wood and Eaucourt l'Abbaye by 47 Divisional Engineers in 1916.

Two wooden memorial crosses erected at High Wood and Eaucourt l'Abbaye by 47 Divisional Engineers in 1916 were falling into disrepair by 1925, when they were replaced in stone. The restored wooden crosses were preserved at the Duke of York's Headquarters in London (the former divisional HQ) until that building was sold in 2003, and are now at Connaught House, the HQ of the London Irish Rifles on the site of the former First Surrey Rifles drill hall at Flodden Road, Camberwell.

== See also ==
- List of British divisions in World War I

== Bibliography ==
- Becke, Maj A. F. (2007) [1935]. History of the Great War: Order of Battle of Divisions, Part 2a: The Territorial Force Mounted Divisions and the 1st-Line Territorial Force Divisions. Vol. 42–56 (Naval & Military Press, Uckfield ed.). London: H M Stationery Office. ISBN 978-1-84734-739-8.
- Edwards, Maj D. K. (1967) A History of the 1st Middlesex Volunteer Engineers (101 (London) Engineer Regiment, TA) 1860–1967, London.
- Hamilton, Nigel (1981). Monty The Making of a General 1887–1942. New York: McGraw-Hill. ISBN 978-0-07-025805-1.
- Jeffery, Keith (2006). Field Marshal Sir Henry Wilson: A Political Soldier. London: Oxford University Press. ISBN 978-0-19-820358-2.
- Joslen, H. F. (2003) [1960]. Orders of Battle: Second World War, 1939–1945. Uckfield, East Sussex: Naval and Military Press. ISBN 978-1-84342-474-1.
- Litchfield, Norman E. H. (1992) The Territorial Artillery 1908–1988 (Their Lineage, Uniforms and Badges), Nottingham: Sherwood Press, ISBN 0-9508205-2-0.
- Lord, Cliff & Watson, Graham (2003) Royal Corps of Signals: Unit Histories of the Corps (1920–2001) and its Antecedents, Solihull: Helion, ISBN 1-874622-92-2.
- Maude, Alan H., ed. (1922). The 47th (London) Division, 1914–1919 by Some who Served with it in the Great War (online scan ed.). London: Amalgamated Press. OCLC 494890858.
- Watson, Graham E.; Rinaldi, Richard A. (2018) The Corps of Royal Engineers: Organization and Units 1889–2018, Tiger Lily Books, ISBN 978-171790180-4.
- Westlake, Ray (1992). British Territorial Units 1914–18. Men-at-Arms Series. Vol. 245. Osprey. ISBN 978-1-85532-168-7.
- Young, Lt-Col Michael (2000) Army Service Corps 1902–1918, Barnsley: Leo Cooper, ISBN 0-85052-730-9.
