= Thomas Morland =

British Army general (1865–1925)

General Sir Thomas Morland KCB KCMG DSO
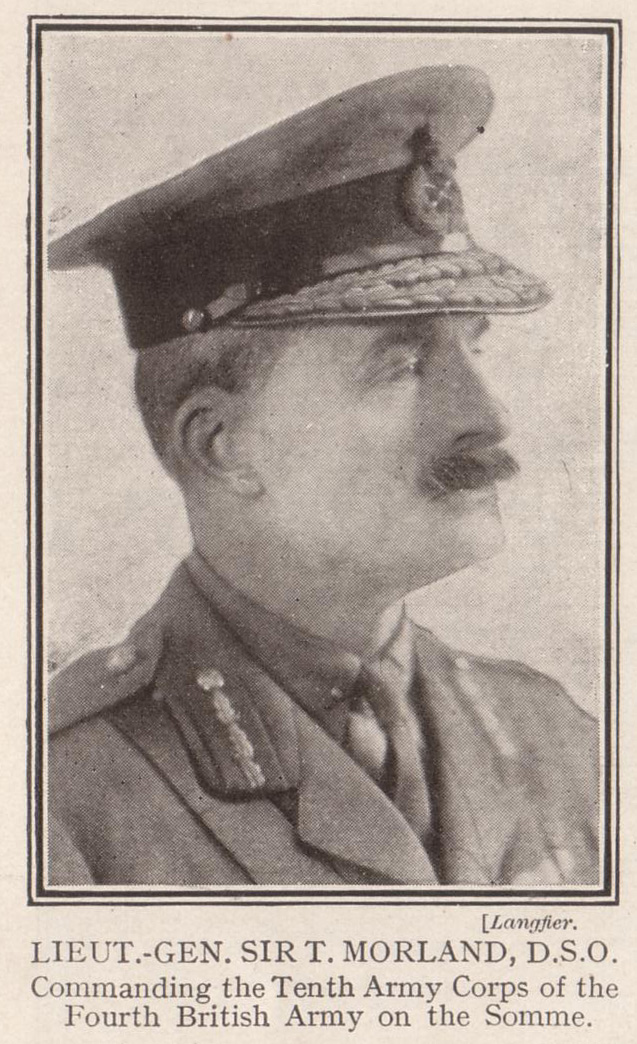
- Born: 9 August 1865; Montreal, Canada East
- Died: 21 May 1925 (aged 59)
- Military career
- Allegiance: United Kingdom
- Branch: British Army
- Service years: 1884–1923
- Rank: General
- Unit: King's Royal Rifle Corps
- Commands: British Army of the Rhine; XIII Corps; X Corps; 5th Division; 14th Division; 2nd London Division; 2nd Infantry Brigade; West African Field Force
- Conflicts: First World War
- Awards: Knight Commander of the Order of the Bath; Knight Commander of the Order of St Michael and St George; Distinguished Service Order; Mentioned in Despatches

General Sir Thomas Lethbridge Napier Morland, KCB, KCMG, DSO (9 August 1865 – 21 May 1925) was a senior British Army officer who served as a distinguished division and corps commander during the First World War, most notably as commander of X Corps during the first day of the Battle of the Somme in July 1916.

== Early life ==
Born in Montreal, Canada East, Morland was the son of Thomas Morland and Helen Servante. Educated at Charterhouse School and the Royal Military College, Sandhurst, Morland was commissioned as a second lieutenant into the King's Royal Rifle Corps in August 1884.

== Early life and military career ==
He attended the Staff College, Camberley, from 1891 to 1892, earning his psc. In February 1895 he was seconded for service on the staff and appointed aide-de-camp to General Sir Arthur Lyon Fremantle. He served in West Africa and was granted the temporary rank of major while so employed.

== Service in West Africa ==
Morland, who in July 1899 was promoted to brevet major, later served in Nigeria, reaching the rank of lieutenant colonel and being appointed commanding officer of the West African Field Force in 1900. The following year, after being promoted to brevet lieutenant colonel in January 1901, and after being made commandant of the West African Frontier Force (for which he was granted the temporary rank of colonel whilst so employed), on 1 May 1901, he was in command of an expedition to Yola, leading to the defeat and deposition of the Emir of Adamawa in September 1901, and to British occupation of the Adamawa Emirate, important for the later occupation of the Sokoto Caliphate as it reduced slave traffic through the Adamawa area. Morland was wounded by a poisoned arrow during the fighting, but stuck to his command. In a despatch describing the expedition, the acting High Commissioner of Northern Nigeria gave him "very great credit for the successful issue of this important expedition." The following year he was appointed a Companion of the Distinguished Service Order (DSO) in recognition of his services (dated 25 April 1902). In 1902 he was appointed commander of the forces in Northern Nigeria, and served as advisor to the French and British commissioners appointed for boundary delimitation in the area. He led a British force to victory in the Battle of Kano in February 1903. He was promoted to lieutenant colonel in May 1904.

In September 1905 he was appointed inspector general of the West African Field Force and for which he was granted the local rank of brigadier general while so employed. For this appointment he was granted the substantive rank of colonel. He completed this assignment in September 1909 and was then again placed on half-pay.

== First World War ==
In June 1910, after coming off of the half-pay list, Morland was promoted to temporary brigadier general and succeeded Nevil Macready in command of the 2nd Infantry Brigade, a position he held until the outbreak of the First World War. In March 1913 he was promoted to major general, while still commanding the brigade.

Morland then became general officer commanding (GOC) 2nd London Division in August 1914, the month of the British entry into World War I, then GOC of 14th (Light) Division in September 1914 and finally GOC of the 5th Division, then serving on the Western Front, in October 1914. He soon saw action with his new command during the First Battle of Ypres which lasted until late November. The division then participated in the Second Battle of Ypres in April 1915.

He was made a KCB in June 1915 "for services rendered in connection with Military Operations in the Field". and was promoted to the temporary rank of lieutenant general in July, and commanded X Corps from then through to April 1918. During this time, he was one of General Sir Henry Rawlinson's Fourth Army corps commanders at the Battle of the Somme in 1916 and one of General Sir Herbert Plumer's corps commanders at the Battle of Messines in 1917.

At the end of the war, Morland, who in January 1918 was promoted to the substantive rank of lieutenant general, took command of XIII Corps, which he commanded for the rest of the war.

== Post-war and final years ==
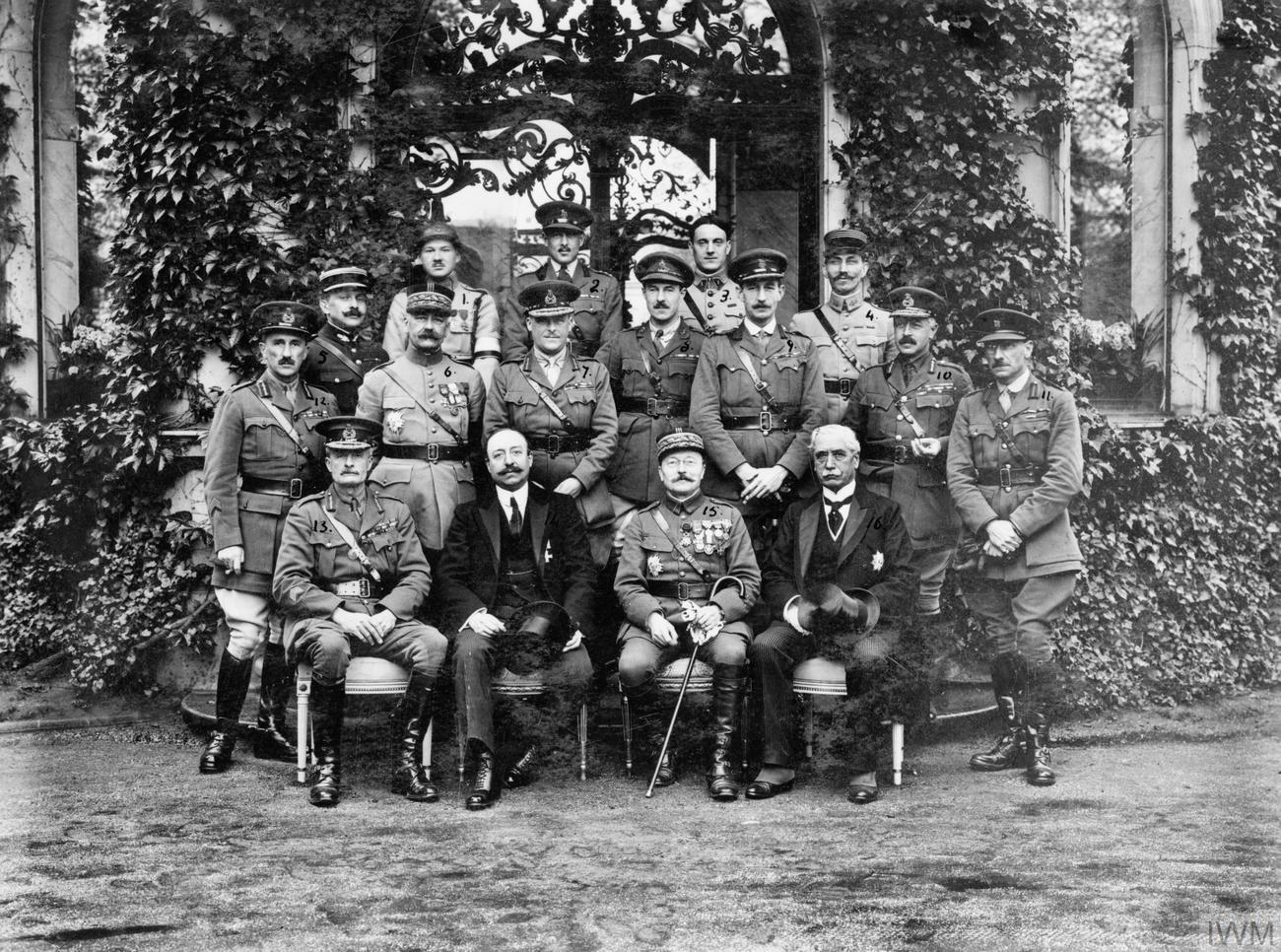
Formal group photograph of British and French officers and commissioners outside the house of the Commander-in-Chief Allied Armies of Occupation, Marienberg, 1919 or 1920. Lieutenant General Morland is sat on the far left in the front row, with Major General William Heneker stood behind.

In August 1919 he became colonel of the Suffolk Regiment.

He held the command of XIII Corps until 1920, when he was promoted and made commander-in-chief of the British Army of the Rhine, in succession to General Sir William Robertson. Two years later, in March 1922, he was appointed General Officer Commanding-in-Chief of Aldershot Command and, after succeeding General Sir Charles Monro as aide-de-camp general to King George V in June, was promoted to full general in November. He retired the following year, in 1923. In January 1925 he was appointed colonel commandant of the 1st Battalion, KRRC.

Morland died at the age of 59 on 21 May 1925 and was buried in the English cemetery at Villeneuve, Montreux.

== Family ==
In 1890, Morland married Mabel St. John, with whom he had two daughters.

== In popular culture ==
Morland was portrayed by Eric Carte in the 2006 BBC docudrama The Somme - From Defeat to Victory.

== Bibliography ==
- Thompson, Bill (2015). Morland - Great War Corps Commander: War Diaries & Letters, 1914-1918. Troubador Publishing. ISBN 978-1784622787.

Military offices
Preceded by Charles Monro	GOC 2nd London Division; August–September 1914	Succeeded by Sir Charles Barter
Preceded by Sir Charles Fergusson	GOC 5th Division; 1914–1915	Succeeded by Charles Kavanagh
New command	GOC X Corps; 1915–1918	Succeeded by William Peyton
Preceded by Sir William Robertson	C-in-C British Army of the Rhine; 1920–1922	Succeeded by Sir Alexander Godley
Preceded by The Earl of Cavan	GOC-in-C Aldershot Command; 1922–1923	Succeeded by Sir Philip Chetwode
Honorary titles
Preceded by Sir Thomas D'Oyly Snow	Colonel of the Suffolk Regiment; 1919–1925	Succeeded by Sir John Ponsonby
