= Sir Charles Monro, 1st Baronet =

British Army general (1860–1929)

General Sir Charles Monro GCB Bt GCSI GCMG KStJ
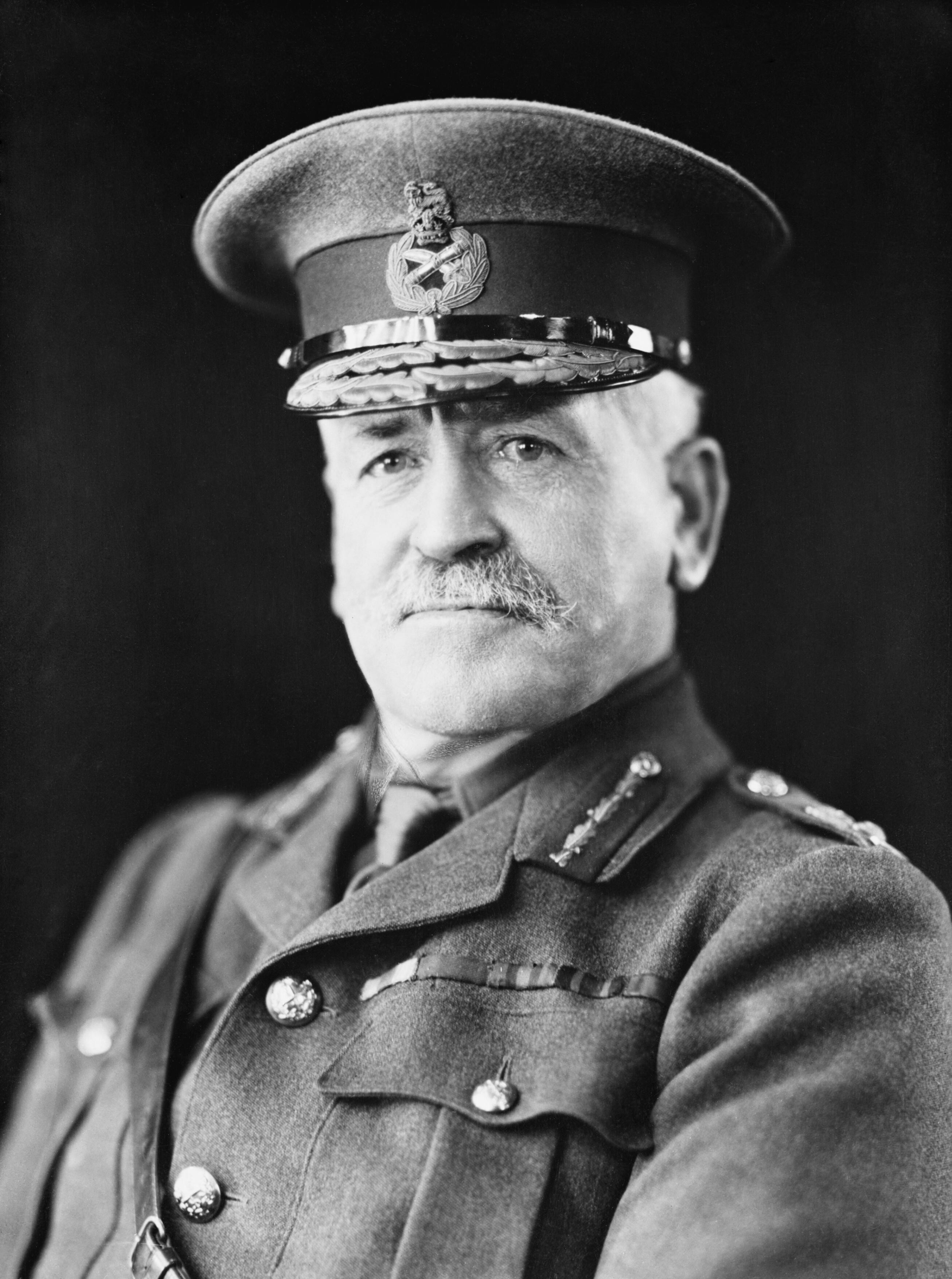
- Born: 15 June 1860; At sea on the Maid of Judah
- Died: 7 December 1929 (aged 69); Westminster, London, England
- Military career
- Allegiance: United Kingdom
- Branch: British Army
- Service years: 1878–1920
- Rank: General
- Unit: Queen's Royal Regiment (West Surrey)
- Commands: 13th Brigade; 2nd London Division; 2nd Division; I Corps; Third Army; Mediterranean Expeditionary Force; First Army; Commander-in-Chief, India
- Conflicts: Second Boer War; First World War; Third Anglo-Afghan War
- Awards: Baronet; Knight Grand Cross of the Order of the Bath; Knight Grand Cross of the Order of St Michael and St George; Knight Grand Commander of the Order of the Star of India
- Other work: Governor of Gibraltar (1923–1928)

General Sir Charles Carmichael Monro, 1st Baronet (15 June 1860 – 7 December 1929) was a British Army General in the First World War. He held the post of Commander-in-Chief, India, in 1916–1920. From 1923 to 1928 he was the Governor of Gibraltar.

== Early military career ==
He was the youngest son of Henry Monro and Catherine Power. Educated at Sherborne School and the Royal Military College, Sandhurst, Monro was commissioned into the 2nd Regiment of Foot as a second lieutenant on 13 August 1879. He was promoted to lieutenant on 15 May 1881 and to captain on 24 July 1889.

He attended the Staff College, Camberley, from 1889 to 1890, gaining his psc, and promoted to major on 23 February 1898, he served as a brigade major from October that year until he was appointed a deputy assistant adjutant general on 15 April 1899. He vacated that appointment in February 1900, as he went to South Africa to serve in the Second Boer War, where he was present at the Battle of Paardeberg in 1900. Promoted to temporary lieutenant-colonel in 1900, he was brevetted to lieutenant-colonel on 29 November 1900.

On 28 March 1903, he was promoted to the substantive rank of lieutenant colonel and appointed commandant of the School of Musketry. Promoted to colonel in 1906, the same year he was made a Companion of the Order of the Bath (CB) in the 1906 Birthday Honours, he then relinquished command of the school on 28 March 1907 and was placed on half-pay. Reverting to normal pay shortly after, on 12 May, he succeeded Henry Merrick Lawson as commander of the 13th Infantry Brigade, then stationed in Dublin, ams was granted the temporary rank of brigadier general whilst so employed in this role.

Promoted to major general on 31 October 1910, on 31 March 1912 he became general officer commanding (GOC) 2nd London Division, a formation of the recently established Territorial Force (TF), taking over from Major General Vesey John Dawson.

== First World War ==
=== Belgium and France ===
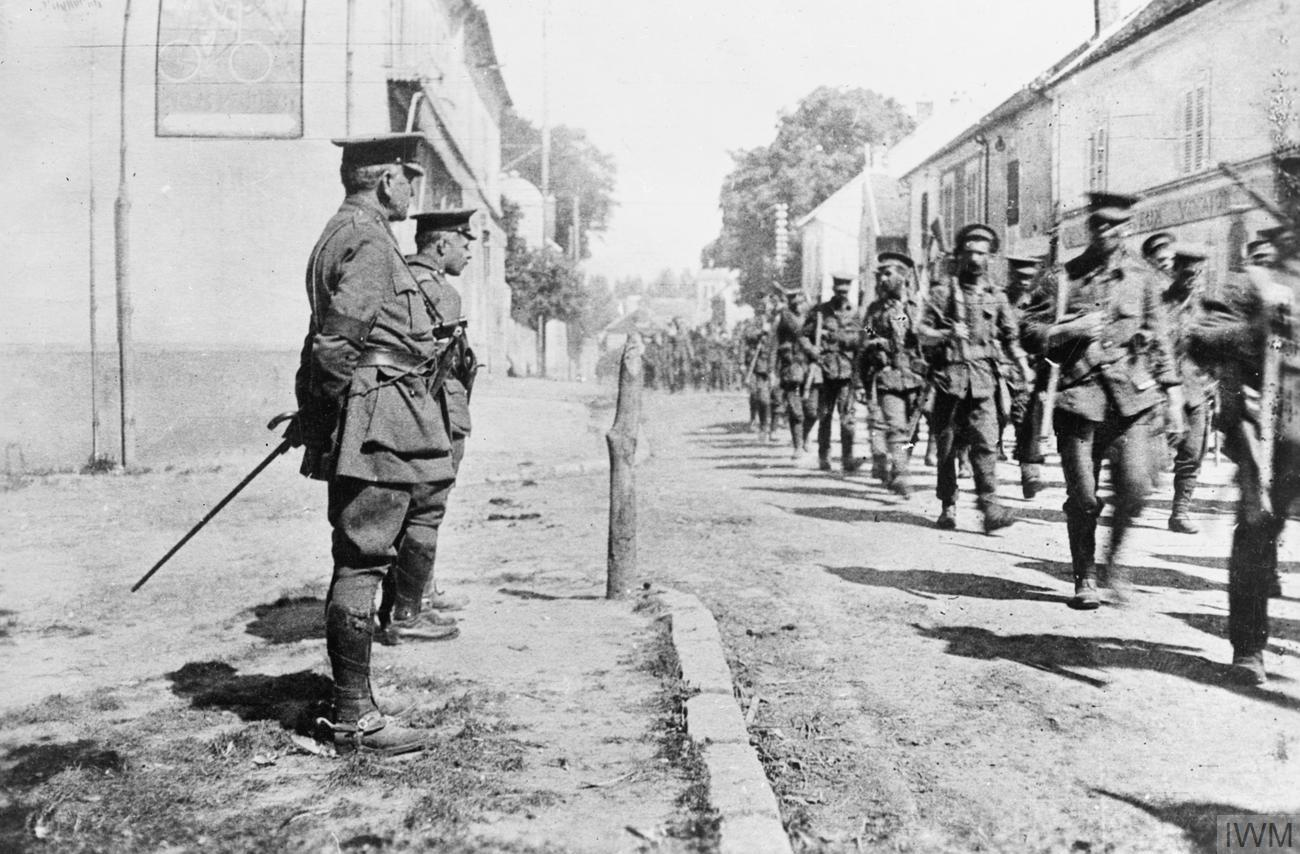
Major-General Charles Monro, with Colonel Neill Malcolm, inspecting troops of the 2nd Division on the march on the Western Front at some point in 1914.

In the early days of the First World War, on 5 August 1914, Monro was appointed as GOC of the 2nd Division of the British Expeditionary Force (BEF), taking over from Major General Sir Archibald Murray, his Sandhurst classmate, who was selected to serve as the BEF's chief of the general staff (CGS). The new assignment brought him into contact with Lieutenant General Sir Douglas Haig, GOC I Corps, in which the 2nd Division was serving. Under Monro's command, the division played an important part in the First Battle of Ypres. He led with what a subordinate described as "the gift of personal magnetism".

On 27 December 1914 he became General Officer Commanding I Corps, with the temporary rank of lieutenant-general. In February 1915 he was made a Knight Commander of the Order of the Bath (KCB), "in connection with Operations in the Field".

He was made General Officer Commanding Third Army on 15 July 1915 with the temporary rank of general. He was promoted to the permanent rank of lieutenant-general on 28 October.

Lieutenant-General Sir Douglas Haig (GOC I Corps) with Major-General Charles Monro, Brigadier-General John Gough (Haig's chief of staff), and Brigadier-General E. M. Perceval (commanding the 2nd Division's artillery) in a street in France, 1914.

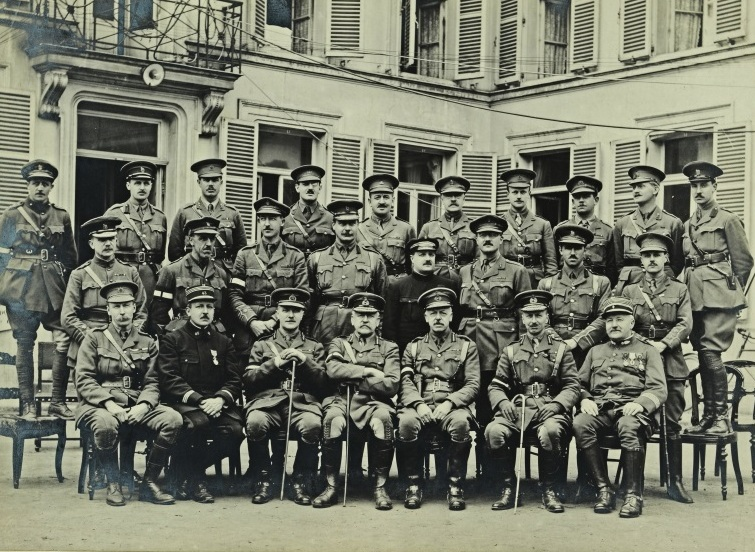
Lieutenant General Charles Monro (front row, centre, arms folded), GOC I Corps, and members of his corps staff in France, c. 1915.

=== Gallipoli ===
In October 1915, the seventh month of the Gallipoli campaign, General Sir Ian Hamilton was dismissed as commander-in-chief (C-in-C) of the Mediterranean Expeditionary Force. Charles Monro was sent to evaluate what had been achieved and to recommend the next steps for the campaign. The Allied position had been drastically altered by the entry of Bulgaria into the war and the Central Powers' subsequent swift conquest of Serbia, which opened the railway from Germany to Constantinople for transporting heavy guns and ammunition. After three days conferring and inspecting the three beachheads, Monro cabled Secretary of State for War Herbert Kitchener to recommend evacuating "the mere fringe of the coast-line" that had been secured. Kitchener would not authorize a withdrawal, which was strongly opposed by the Navy, instead, he came to the Middle East to see for himself. After arriving on 9 November 1915 he and Monro toured the fronts, landing on open beaches since there were no ports. Then they visited the Allied lines in Greek Macedonia, where reinforcements were badly needed. On 17 November 1915, Kitchener agreed to evacuate and put Monro in control as Commander-in-Chief Mediterranean. The architect of the Dardanelles campaign, Winston Churchill, resigned from the government in protest. He later memorably described Monro's stance as "He came, he saw, he capitulated" (a parody of Julius Caesar's line veni, vidi, vici). The War Committee dithered, finally on 7 December agreeing to evacuate two of the bridgeheads (ANZAC Cove and Suvla Bay). Their reluctance was understandable: Ottoman guns were able to strike the landing zones on all three beachheads, so evacuation casualties were estimated at thirty to forty per cent – Monro requested fifty-six hospital ships. On 19–20 December, the two beachheads were evacuated without a single casualty, leaving behind only some spiked artillery and slaughtered mules. It was a masterly display by the commanders of the beachheads and their staff. After further pressure from Monro, the evacuation of the remaining beachhead at Cape Helles was authorized on 28 December with the agreement of the French who had troops there. It was skillfully executed on the night of 8–9 January 1916, again astonishingly without casualties. They had taken off 83,048 men, 4,695 horses and mules, 1,718 vehicles, and 186 heavy guns.

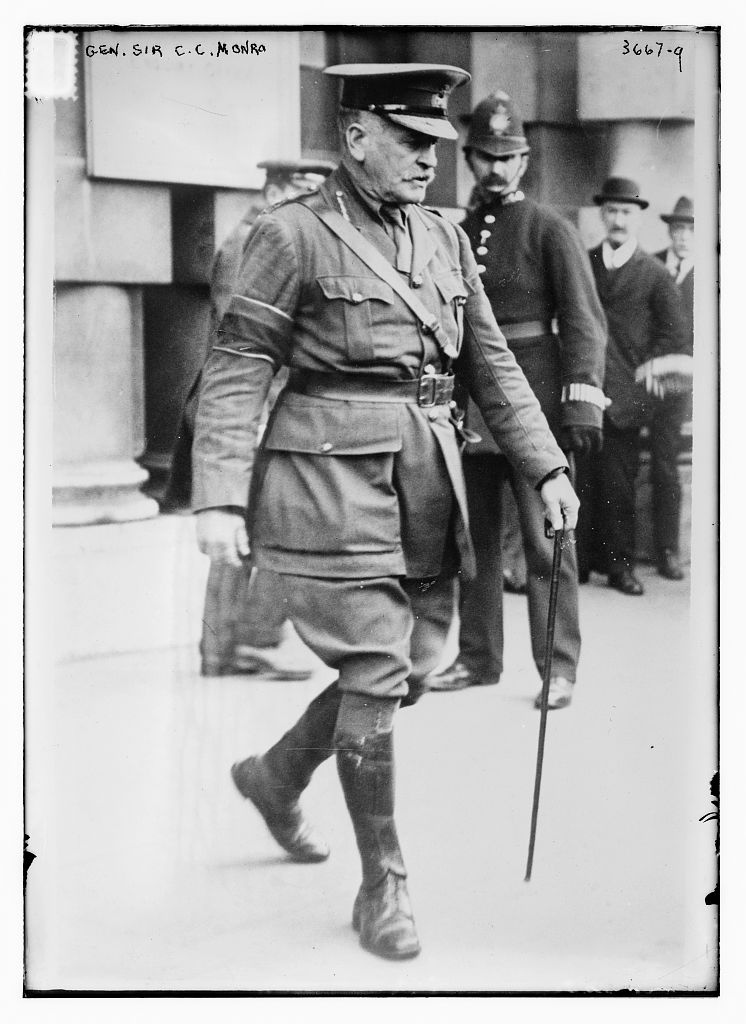
Lieutenant General Monro in 1915.

=== Return to France and Belgium ===
Monro returned to France in early 1916 and soon took command of the First Army in February, succeeding General Sir Douglas Haig, who had been promoted to C-in-C of the BEF in place of French.

In July, after the Battle of the Somme had begun further south, the First Army (specifically Lieutenant General Richard Haking's XI Corps) executed the Battle of Fromelles. This was a diversionary attack intended to prevent German reinforcements from reaching the Somme offensive. It is remembered as a disaster that resulted in heavy casualties, particularly for the Australian 5th Division, which had only recently arrived in France, without achieving its strategic objectives.

=== India ===
He was selected to be Commander-in-Chief India later that year. He was a fine choice, because his "Standard was whether a man was an Empire-builder." One of his responsibilities was the campaign in Mesopotamia. On 1 August 1916 the Chief of the Imperial General Staff (CIGS), General Sir William Robertson, ordered him to "keep up a good show" in Mesopotamia but not to make any further attempts to take Baghdad – this restriction was overruled on the War Committee by Curzon and Chamberlain. On his way to India Monro inspected the forces in Mesopotamia commanded by General Maude. After receiving Monro's favourable report on 18 September 1916 the War Committee authorized Maude to attack. On 1 October 1916, Monro was promoted to the substantive rank of general. Baghdad was taken on 11 March 1917. In off hours Monro continued to charm with his "whimsical, almost fantastic type of humour."

== Later life ==
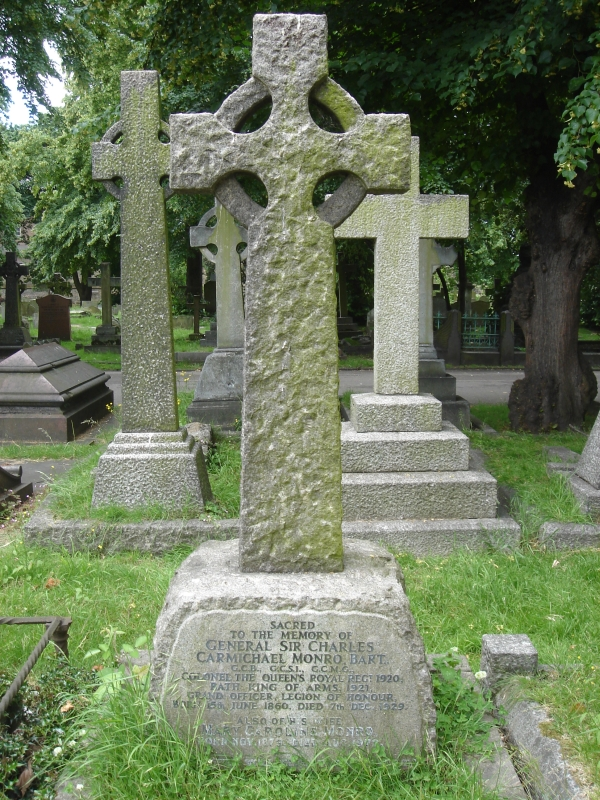
Funerary monument, Brompton Cemetery, London.

In October 1920 he was appointed colonel of the Queen's Royal West Surrey Regiment. In May 1921, Monro was created a Baronet, of Bearcrofts in the Shire of Stirling. In September 1923 Monro was appointed governor of Gibraltar.

In 1915, he married Mary Caroline O'Hagan, youngest daughter of Thomas O'Hagan, 1st Baron O'Hagan, Lord Chancellor of Ireland, and his second wife Alice Towneley: they had no children.

Mary, Lady Monro, was named a Dame Commander of the Order of the British Empire in 1919.

Sir Charles Monro died of cancer in December 1929. He was buried at Brompton Cemetery in London.

== Honours ==
=== British ===
- Knight Grand Cross of the Order of St. Michael and St. George (GCMG): 1 January 1916
- Knight Grand Cross of the Order of the Bath (GCB): 1 January 1919 (KCB: 18 February 1915; CB: 1906 Birthday Honours)
- Knight Grand Commander of the Order of the Star of India (GCSI): 3 June 1919
- Baronet of Bearcrofts in the Shire of Stirling: 12 May 1921

=== Others ===
- Grand Officer of the Legion of Honour of France: 10 September 1915
- Grand Cordon of the Order of the Rising Sun of the Empire of Japan: 17 May 1919

Military offices
Preceded by ??	Commandant of the School of Musketry; 1903–1907	Succeeded by Granville Egerton
Preceded by Vesey Dawson	GOC 2nd London Division; 1912–1914	Succeeded by Thomas Morland
Preceded by Archibald Murray	GOC 2nd Division; August–December 1914	Succeeded by Henry Horne
Preceded by Douglas Haig	GOC I Corps; 1914–1915	Succeeded by Hubert Gough
New post	GOC Third Army; July–September 1915	Succeeded by Sir Edmund Allenby
Preceded by Sir John Maxwell	GOC British Troops in Egypt; 1915–1916	Succeeded by Sir Archibald Murray
Preceded by Sir Ian Hamilton	GOC Mediterranean Expeditionary Force; 1915–1916	Succeeded by Sir Archibald Murray
Preceded by Sir Henry Rawlinson	GOC First Army; January–October 1916	Succeeded by Sir Henry Horne
Preceded by Sir Beauchamp Duff	Commander-in-Chief, India; 1916–1920	Succeeded by The Lord Rawlinson
Honorary titles
Preceded by Sir Edward Hamilton	Colonel of the Queen's Royal Regiment (West Surrey); 1920–1929	Succeeded by Sir Wilkinson Bird
Preceded by B. T. L. Thomson	Honorary Colonel of the 23rd London Regiment; 1922–1928	Succeeded by The Lord Astor of Hever
Government offices
Preceded by Sir Horace Smith-Dorrien	Governor of Gibraltar; 1923–1928	Succeeded by Sir Alexander Godley
Baronetage of the United Kingdom
New creation	Baronet of Bearcrofts; 1920–1929	Extinct
Heraldic offices
Preceded by Sir George Callaghan	King of Arms of the Order of the Bath; 1920–1929	Succeeded by Sir William Pakenham
