= Malras =

Commune in Occitanie, France

- Commune
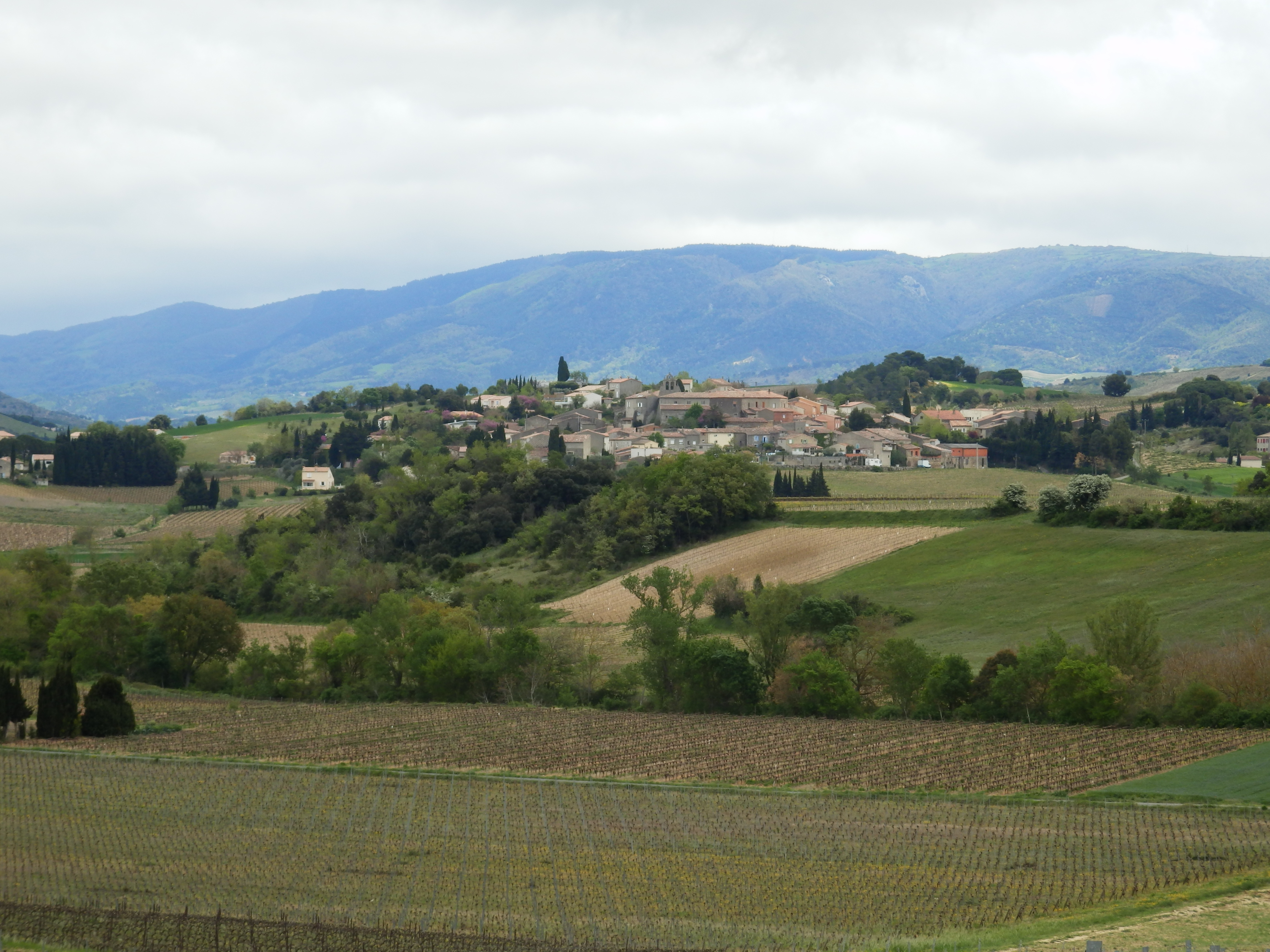
- A general view of Malras

- Coat of arms
- Location of Malras
- Location within France Location within Occitanie
- Coordinates: 43°03′52″N 2°10′23″E
- Country: France
- Region: Occitania
- Department: Aude
- Arrondissement: Limoux
- Canton: La Région Limouxine
- Intercommunality: Limouxin

Government
  - Mayor (2020–2026): Bernard Calvel
- Area^{1}: 4.22 km^{2} (1.63 sq mi)
- Elevation: 225 m (738 ft)
- Highest elevation: 286 m (938 ft)
- Lowest elevation: 194 m (636 ft)
- Population (2023): 444
  - Density: 105/km^{2} (273/sq mi)
- Time zone: UTC+01:00 (CET)
  - Summer (DST): UTC+02:00 (CEST)
- INSEE/Postal code: 11214 /11300
- ^{1} French Land Register data, which excludes lakes, ponds, glaciers > 1 km^{2} (0.386 sq mi or 247 acres) and river estuaries.

Malras (French pronunciation: [malʁas]; Occitan: Malràs) is a commune in the Aude department in the Occitania region of southern France.

The British military illustrator and author Michael Chappell lived in the village.

== Population ==
Historical population
Year	Pop.	±% p.a.
1968	300	—
1975	303	+0.14%
1982	332	+1.31%
1990	348	+0.59%
1999	330	−0.59%
2007	347	+0.63%
2012	364	+0.96%
2017	396	+1.70%
2023	444	+1.93%
Source: INSEE

== See also ==
- Communes of the Aude department
