= Battle of Kano =

- Part of the Pacification of Northern Nigeria
Date	3 February 1903
Location	Kano, Northern Nigeria
Result	British victory

Belligerents
Sokoto Caliphate: Kano Emirate	(United Kingdom) British Empire: Protectorate of Northern Nigeria

Commanders and leaders
Madakin Kano	(United Kingdom of Great Britain and Ireland) Thomas Morland

Strength
300 cavalry	100 cavalry 800 Infantry (rank and file)

Casualties and losses
Unknown	70 killed or wounded

The Battle of Kano was an important military engagement fought between the British Empire and the Sokoto Caliphate and their vassal state, the Kano Emirate. The battle took place in what is now Northern Nigeria.

== Background ==
In 1899, Lord Lugard had proclaimed a British protectorate over much of the Sokoto Caliphate. with the failure of numerous diplomatic overtures to the Caliph, in 1900 a military campaign was launched to subdue the caliphate.

The British pacification campaign termed the Kano-Sokoto Expedition set off from Zaria at the end of January 1903 under the command of Colonel Thomas Morland, heading up a force of British officers and N.C.O.s and 800 African rank and file. Apart from a company of mounted infantry and a few gunners, the whole force consisted of infantry. They were supported, however, by four 75-mm. mountain guns, which could if necessary be dismantled and transported by porters, and by six machine guns.

== Battle ==
After sporadic fighting outside the walls of the fort, the British managed to penetrate the defensive parameters of the capital. Kano was mostly left defenseless at the time. The emir, Aliyu Babba, was away with its large contingent of cavalry for the autumn campaign at Sokoto. Madakin Kano, a local noble, rallied whatever troops there were still in the city to defend it. Despite his efforts, the British successfully took over the city after heavy fight wherein the defenders sustained 70 casualties.

== Aftermath ==
News of the British capture of Kano in February 1903 sent the Emir's cavalry in a long march to retake the city in the decisive Battle of Kwatarkwashi.

== Gallery ==
Images of the battlefield.

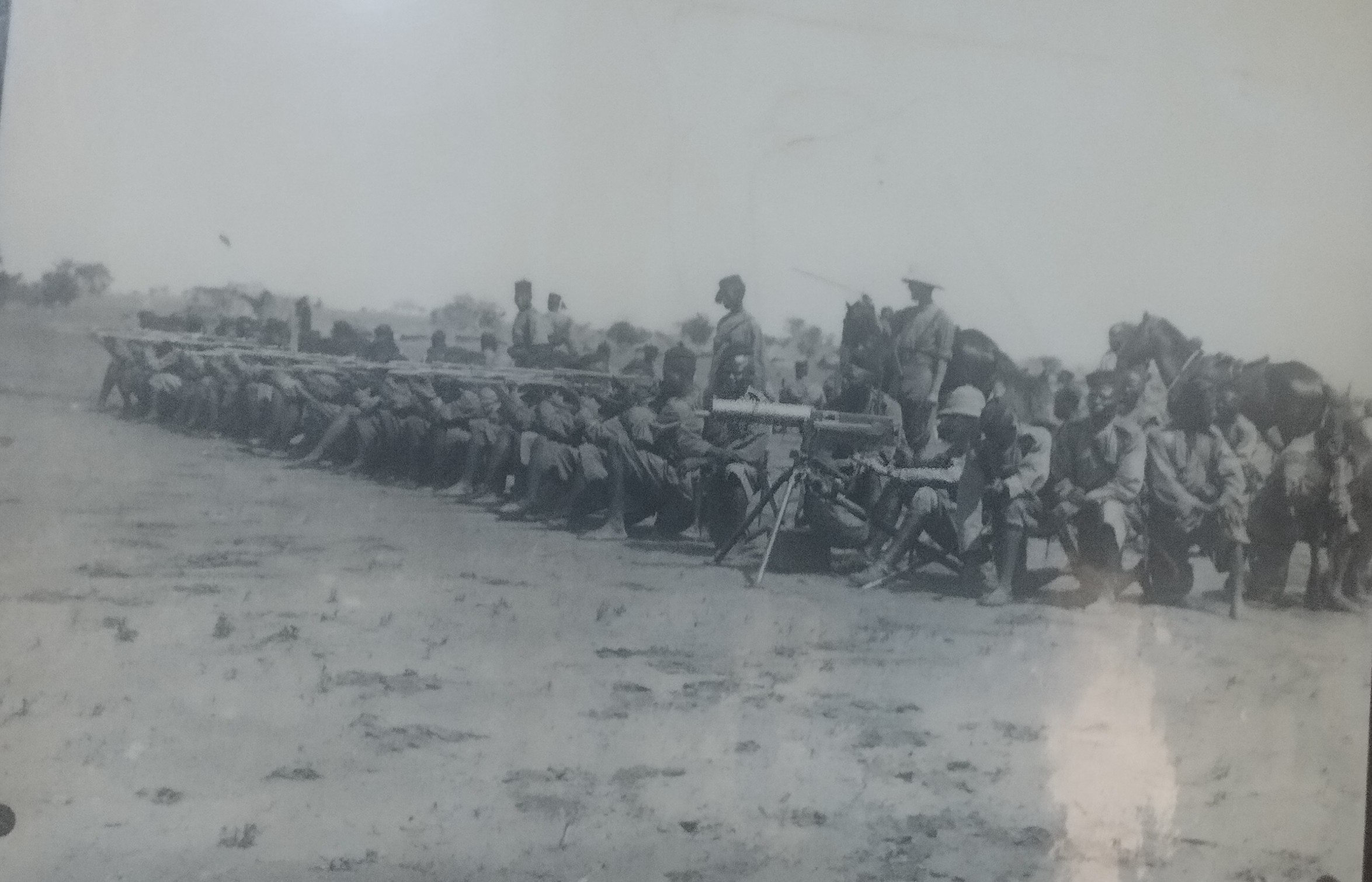
British Army during Kano Conquest

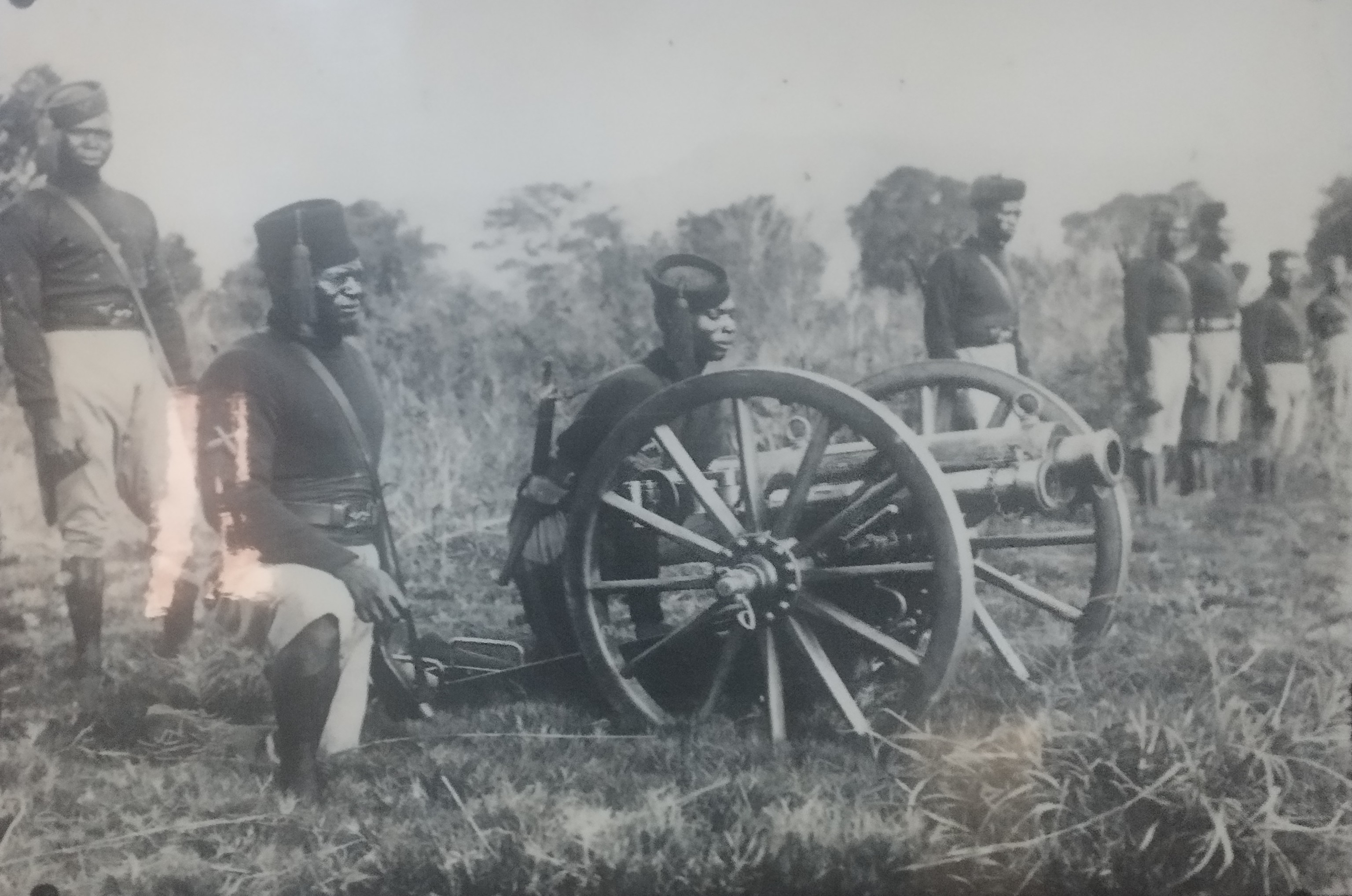
British Army during Kano Conquest

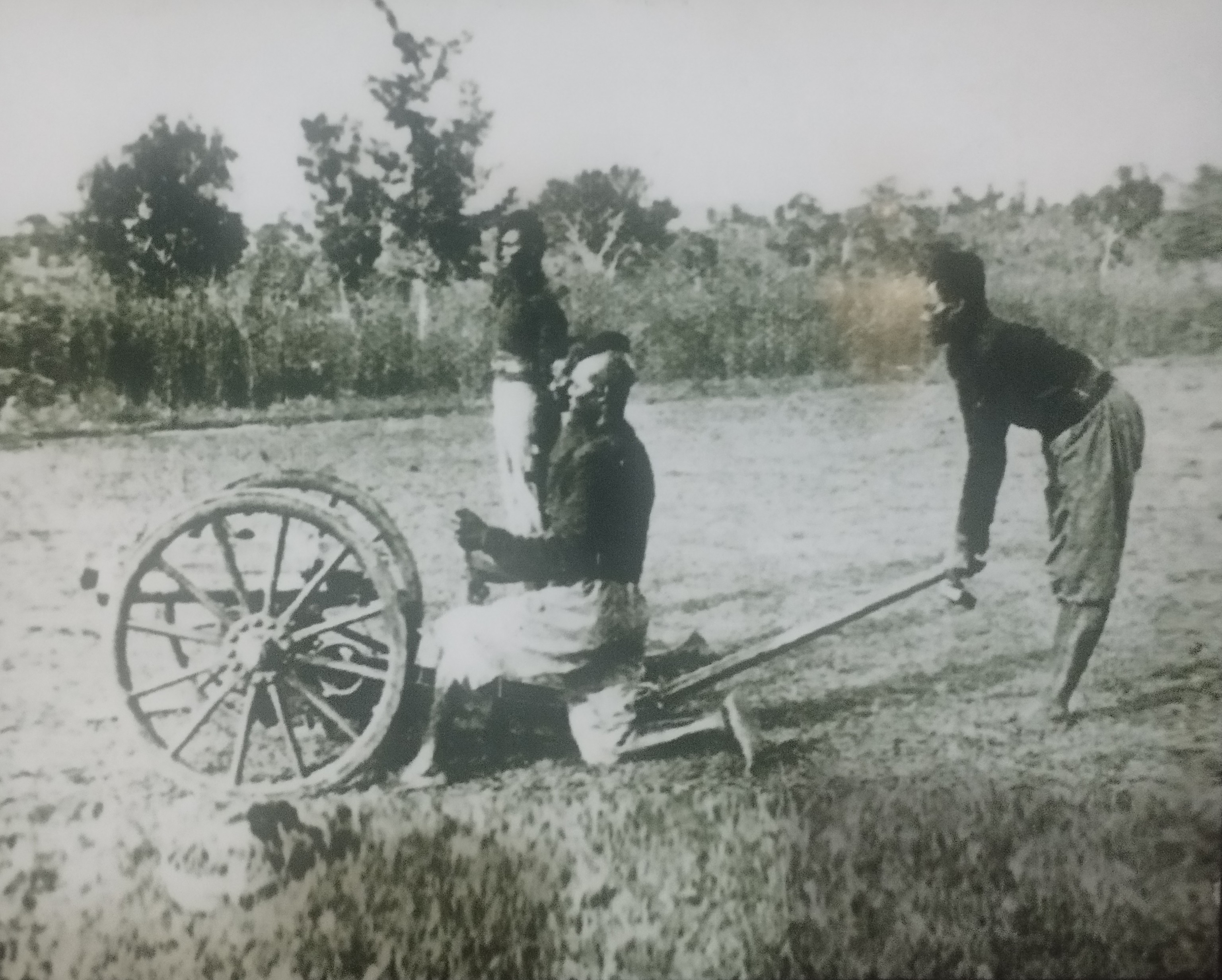
British Army during Kano Conquest

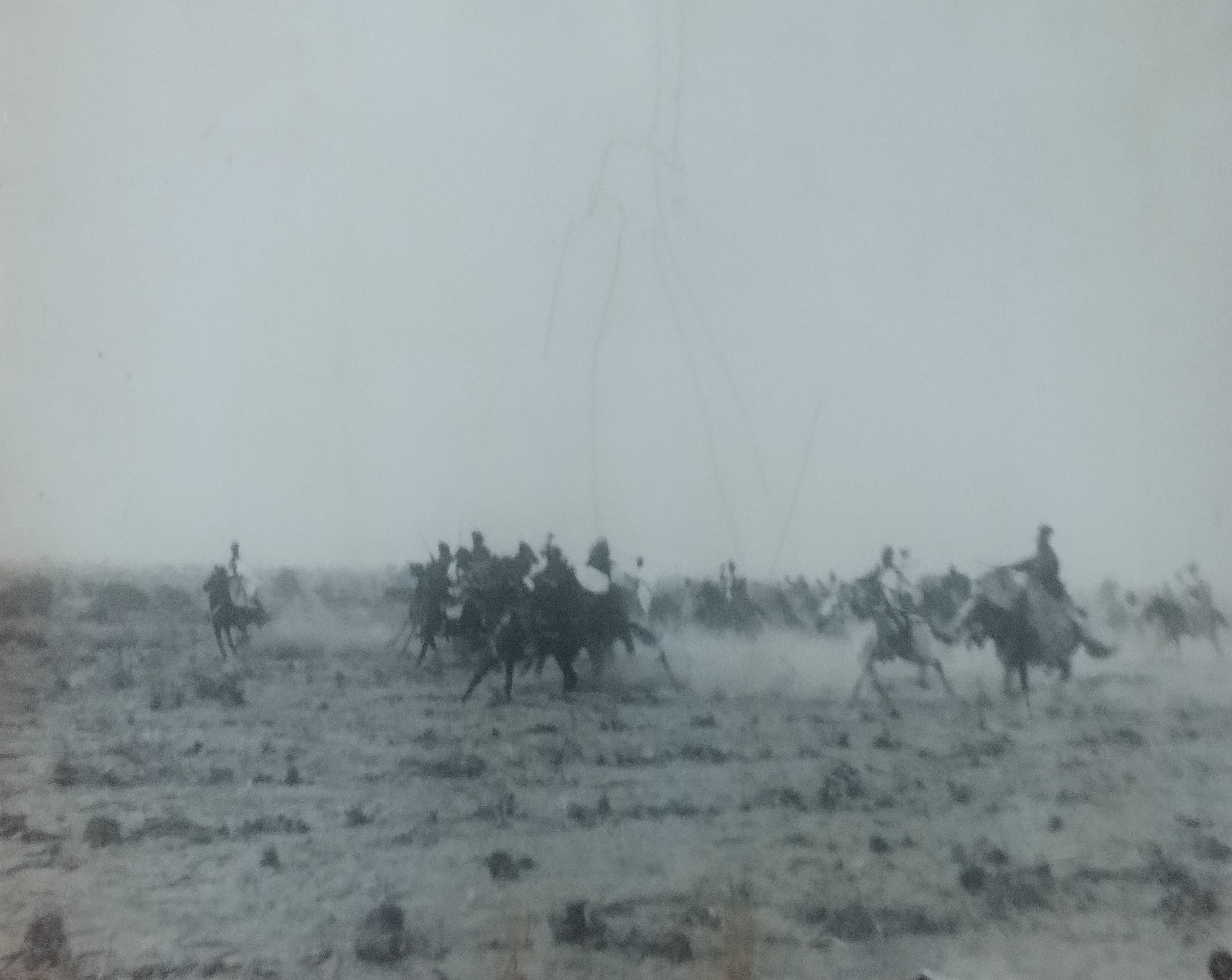
Kano army

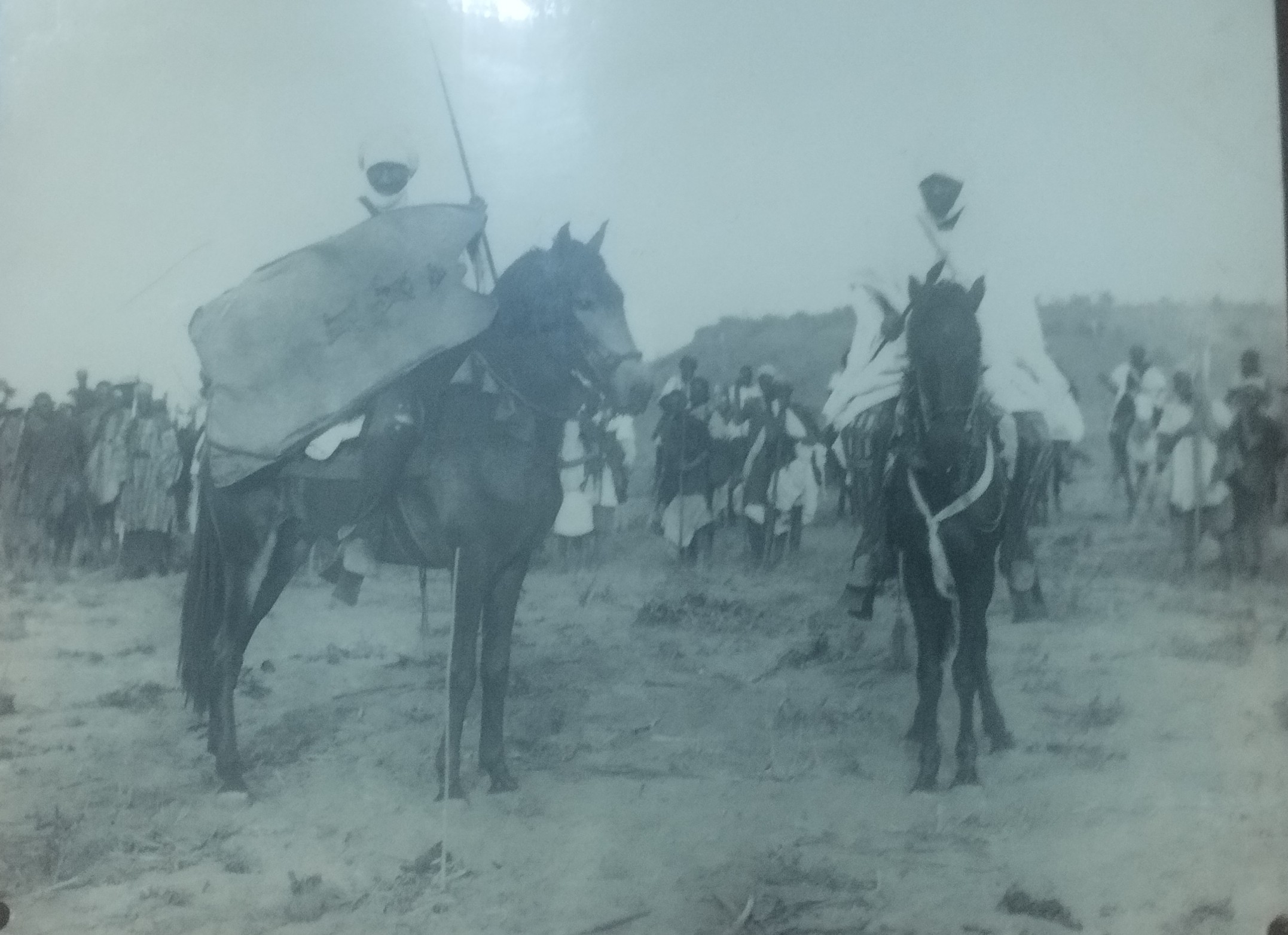
Kano army

== See also ==
- Battle of Kwatarkwashi
