= Windy Corner, Cuinchy =

British cemetery in Pas-de-Calais, France

Coordinates: 50.529583°N 2.742044°E

Windy Corner was a road junction near the village of Cuinchy in the First World War. It was in the section of the line held by the British army and there was a battalion headquarters there. Burials took place there and there is now a cemetery maintained by the Commonwealth War Graves Commission. 3,443 dead were buried there of which 1,246 have been identified.

Major John Mackenzie (1871–1915) recipient of the Victoria Cross in the 19th century Anglo-Ashanti wars is buried here.
