= Ewart =

Ewart is both a given name and a surname. Notable people with the name include:

== Given name ==
- Ewart Abner (1923–1997), American record company executive
- Ewart Adamson (1882–1945), Scottish screenwriter
- Ewart Astill (1888–1948), English Test cricketer
- Ewart C. Atkinson (1892–1967), Canadian politician
- Ewart Bell (1924–2001), Ireland international rugby union player & civil servant
- Ewart Beswick (1897–1978), English footballer
- Ewart Boddington (1927–2015), English brewing executive
- Ewart Brown (born 1946), Premier of Bermuda
- Ewart Culpin (1877–1946), British politician and town planner
- Ewart Farvis (1911–2005), Scottish electronics engineer
- Ewart Grogan (1874–1967), British explorer, politician, and entrepreneur
- Ewart Guinier (1910–1990), Jamaican-American academic and lawyer
- Ewart John Arlington Harnum (1910–1996), Lieutenant-Governor of Newfoundland and Labrador
- Ewart Horsfall (1892–1974), British rower
- Ewart Jones (1911–2002), Welsh chemist
- Ewart Lewis (1914–1963), Welsh Anglican priest
- Ewart Alan Mackintosh (1893–1917), Scottish poet
- Ewart Milne (1903–1987), Irish poet
- Ewart Nicholson (born 1993), Trinidadian cricketer
- Ewart Oakeshott (1916–2002), British illustrator, collector, and amateur historian
- Ewart G. Plank (1897–1982), US Army general
- Ewart Potgieter (boxer) (1932-1998), South African boxer
- Ewart Runciman (1907–1981), Australian politician
- Ewart Smith (1920–1991), Australian public servant

== Middle name ==
- William Ewart Gladstone (1809–1898), British politician

== Surname ==
- Alfred James Ewart (1872-1937), English-Australian botanist
- Annie Ewart (born 1993), Canadian cyclist
- Arthur Ewart (1862–1922), Royal Navy Admiral
- Charles Ewart (1769–1846), British soldier
- Charles Brisbane Ewart (1827–1903), British Army officer and Lieutenant Governor of Jersey
- Charley Ewart (1915–1990), American football player and coach
- Dave Ewart (born 1969), American football player and coach
- David Ewart (1841–1921), Canadian architect
- David Shanks Ewart (1901–1965), UK artist
- Donald Ewart (1930–2022), American electrical engineer
- Dorothea Ewart (1870–1956), British historian
- Douglas Ewart (born 1946), American musician
- Duwayne Ewart (born 1998), Canadian soccer player
- Edward Ewart (1860–1935), Scotland international rugby union player
- Ewa Ewart (born 1956), Polish film director
- Fearne Ewart (born 1936), British swimmer
- Florence Maude Ewart (1864–1949), English violinist and composer
- Frank Ewart (1876–1947), Australian clergy
- Gavin Ewart (1916–1995), English poet
- Gladys Ewart (1892–1957), Canadian pianist
- Hamilton G. Ewart (1849–1918), American judge
- Henry Ewart (1838–1928), British Army officer and courtier
- Ivan Ewart (1919–1995), Northern Irish naval officer and businessman
- J. S. Ewart (1849–1933), Canadian lawyer and author
- James Cossar Ewart (1851-1933), Scottish zoologist
- James Oliver Ewart (1917–1945), British intelligence officer
- Jesse Ewart (born 1994), Australian-Irish bicycle racer
- Jock Ewart (1891–1943), Scottish footballer
- John Ewart (1928–1994), Australian actor
- John Ewart (architect), Canadian architect and businessman
- John Ewart (doctor), New Zealand doctor and hospital superintendent
- John Albert Ewart (1872–1964), Canadian architect
- John Alexander Ewart (1821–1904), British Army general
- Joseph Ewart (1759–1792), Scottish diplomat
- Joseph Christopher Ewart (1799–1868), British politician
- Joyce Vera Mary Ewart (1916–1964), Australian artist
- Mary Anne Ewart (1830–1911), English patron of higher education for women
- Paul Ewart, British atomic and laser physicist
- Peter Ewart (1767–1842), British engineer
- Peter Maxwell Ewart (1918–2001), Canadian painter
- Richard Ewart (1904–1953), British politician
- Spencer Ewart (1861–1930), British Army general
- Stephen Ewart (1869–1953), British actor
- Tom Ewart (died 1989), West Indian cricket umpire
- Wendy Ewart, British scientist
- William Dana Ewart (1851–1908), American inventor
- William Ewart (British politician) (1798–1869), British politician
- William Ewart (physician) (1848–1929), English physician

== See also ==
- Ewert
- D'Ewart
