= General Ewart (disambiguation) =

Spencer Ewart (1861–1930) was a British Army lieutenant general. General Ewart may also refer to:

- Charles Brisbane Ewart (1827–1903), British Army lieutenant general
- Henry Ewart (1838–1928), British Army major general
- John Alexander Ewart (1821–1904), British Army general

== See also ==
- Wolf Ewert (1905–1994), German Wehrmacht major general
