= John Ewart (disambiguation) =

John Ewart (1928–1994) was an Australian actor

John Ewart may also refer to:

- John Ewart (architect) (1788–1856), Canadian architect and business
- John Albert Ewart (1872–1964), Canadian architect
- Jock Ewart (1891–1943), Scottish footballer
- John Ewart (doctor) (1858–1939), New Zealand doctor and hospital superintendent
- J. S. Ewart (John Skirving Ewart, 1849–1933), Canadian lawyer and author
- Sir John Alexander Ewart (1821–1904), Scottish military leader
