= Ewert =

Ewert is both a surname and a given name. Notable people with the name include:

== Surname ==
- Adolph W. Ewert (born 1865), American politician in the state of South Dakota
- Taylor Ewert (born 2001), American Track and Field runner
- Arthur Ewert (1890–1959), German Communist activist and Comintern functionary
- Craig Ewert, subject of the 2008 documentary Right to Die?
- Fritz Ewert (1937–1990), German football player
- Jacob Ewert (1874–1923), American socialist and pacifist
- Jörg-Peter Ewert (born 1938), German neurophysiologist and neuroethologist
- Keith Ewert (1918–1989), Australian politician
- Marcus Ewert (born 1972), American writer, actor and director
- Maximilian C. Jehuda Ewert (born 1974), German composer and violinist
- Rebecca Ewert (born 1955), New Zealand diver
- Renate Ewert (1933–1966), German actress
- Wolf Ewert (1905–1994), German general

== Given name ==
- Ewert Bengtsson, 2015 Fellow of the IEEE
- Ewert Janssen (died c. 1692), Danish architect who became a royal masterbuilder in 1668
- Ewert Karlsson (1918–2004), Swedish artist and political cartoonist

== See also ==
- Errin Ewerts (born 1988), South African cricketer
- Ewart, both a given name and a surname
- Ferdinand Ewert Building, a historic row house in Davenport, Iowa
- Ewert and The Two Dragons, an Estonian indie-rock band
