= Philotheca fitzgeraldii =

Scientific classification
- Kingdom: Plantae
- Clade: Embryophytes
- Clade: Tracheophytes
- Clade: Spermatophytes
- Clade: Angiosperms
- Clade: Eudicots
- Clade: Rosids
- Order: Sapindales
- Family: Rutaceae
- Genus: Philotheca
- Species: P. fitzgeraldii

Binomial name
- Philotheca fitzgeraldii (C.R.P.Andrews) Paul G.Wilson

Synonyms
- Eriostemon apricus Diels; Eriostemon fitzgeraldii C.R.P.Andrews; Eriostemon gibbosus Luehm. ex Ewart; Phebalium apricum (Diels) Ewart & B.Rees

Species of plant

Philotheca fitzgeraldii is a species of flowering plant in the family Rutaceae and is endemic to the south of Western Australia. It is an erect, compact or spreading shrub with cylindrical, glandular-warty leaves and white flowers arranged singly in leaf axils and on the ends of branchlets.

== Description ==
Philotheca fitzgeraldii is an erect, compact or spreading shrub that grows to a height of 30–60 cm (12–24 in) with minutely hairy branchlets. The leaves are more or less cylindrical, glandular-warty, 35–50 mm (1.4–2.0 in) long and about 1 mm (0.039 in) wide and channelled on the upper surface. The flowers are borne singly in leaf axils and on the ends of branchlets, each flower on a pedicel 1–2 mm (0.039–0.079 in) long. There are five leathery, semi-circular sepals about 1 mm (0.039 in) long and five egg-shaped white petals about 4 mm (0.16 in) long. The ten stamens are glabrous. Flowering occurs from June to October and the fruit is about 3.5 mm (0.14 in) long and beaked.

== Taxonomy and naming ==
This philotheca was first formally described in 1904 by Cecil Andrews who gave it the name Eriostemon fitzgeraldii and published the description in Journal of the West Australian Natural History Society from specimens he collected "on sand plains north of Esperance" in 1903. In 1998, Paul Wilson changed the name to Philotheca fitzgeraldii in the journal Nuytsia.

== Distribution and habitat ==
Philotheca fitzgeraldii grows in heath and woodland between Norseman and Caiguna in the Coolgardie, Esperance Plains and Mallee biogeographic regions.

== Conservation status ==
This species is classified as "not threatened" by the Western Australian Government Department of Parks and Wildlife,
