= 1920–21 British Home Championship =

Tournament details
- Host country: England, Northern Ireland, Scotland and Wales
- Dates: 23 October 1920 –11 April 1921
- Teams: 4

Final positions
- Champions: Scotland (17th title)
- Runners-up: Wales; England (shared)

Tournament statistics
- Matches played: 6
- Goals scored: 13 (2.17 per match)
- Top scorer: (Scotland) Andrew Wilson (4 goals)

The 1920–21 British Home Championship was a football tournament played between the British Home Nations during the 1920–21 season. The second tournament played since the hiatus of the First World War, the 1921 competition was dominated by Scotland, who won the first of seven championships they would claim throughout the decade. England and reigning champions Wales came joint second as goal difference was not at this stage used to separate teams.

England and Ireland kicked off the competition in October 1920, with England gaining an early advantage through a 2–0 victory. Action resumed the following February when Scotland beat current champions Wales at home and then Ireland away, to top the table. Wales and England both needed victory in their match to have a chance of catching Scotland, but both sides nullified each other and the result was a scoreless draw, requiring an English victory over the Scots in their final game to beat Scotland's lead. In the final games played simultaneously on 9 April, Wales beat Ireland to elevate themselves into joint second place as England crashed 3–0 to a superior Scottish side in Glasgow, thus making Scotland British Champions.

== Table ==
Team	Pld	W	D	L	GF	GA	GD	Pts
Scotland (C)	3	3	0	0	7	1	+6	6
Wales	3	1	1	1	3	3	0	3
England	3	1	1	1	2	3	−1	3
Ireland	3	0	0	3	1	6	−5	0

Rules for classification: 1) points. The points system worked as follows: 2 points for a win and 1 point for a draw.
(C) Champions

== Results ==
23 October 1920

England	2–0	Ireland
Kelly 8'; Walker 47'

Roker Park, Sunderland
Attendance: 22,000
Referee: Alex Jackson (Scotland)

12 February 1921

Scotland	2–1	Wales
Wilson 11', 46'		Collier 30'

Pittodrie, Aberdeen
Attendance: 20,824
Referee: James Mason (England)

26 February 1921

Ireland	0–2	Scotland
		Wilson 10' (pen.); Cassidy 87'

Windsor Park, Belfast
Attendance: 40,000
Referee: Arthur Ward (England)

14 March 1921

Wales	0–0	England

Ninian Park, Cardiff
Attendance: 12,000
Referee: Alex Jackson (Scotland)

9 April 1921

Scotland	3–0	England
Wilson 20'; Morton 43'; Cunningham 53'

Hampden Park, Glasgow
Attendance: 85,000
Referee: Arthur Ward (England)

9 April 1921

Wales	2–1	Ireland
Hole 35'; S. Davies		Chambers 60'

Vetch Field, Swansea
Attendance: 20,000
Referee: Jack Howcraft (England)

== Winning squad ==
- Scotland

Name	Apps/Goals by opponent			Total	
Name	(Wales) WAL	(Ireland) IRE	(England) ENG	Apps	Goals
Andy Wilson	1/2	1/1	1/1	3	4
Jack Marshall	1	1	1	3	0
Jimmy McMullan	1	1	1	3	0
Andy Cunningham	1		1/1	2	1
Joe Cassidy	1	1/1		2	1
Alex McNab		1	1	2	0
Tom Miller		1	1	2	0
Kenny Campbell	1	1		2	0
Joe Harris	1	1		2	0
Willie McStay	1	1		2	0
Alex Troup	1	1		2	0
Alan Morton			1/1	1	1
Dod Brewster			1	1	0
Jimmy Blair			1	1	0
Stewart Davidson			1	1	0
Jock Ewart			1	1	0
Sandy Archibald	1			1	0
Charlie Pringle	1			1	0
Alex Graham		1		1	0
