= Arthur Ewart =

Royal Navy Admiral (1862–1922)

Admiral Arthur Ewart
- Born: 23 December 1862
- Died: 18 November 1922 (aged 59); Dumfries
- Spouse: Violet Haworth-Booth (m. 1903)
- Relatives: Sir John Ewart (father); Sir Spencer Ewart (brother)
- Military career
- Allegiance: United Kingdom
- Branch: Royal Navy
- Service years: 1875–1911
- Rank: Admiral
- Commands: HMS Doris; HMS Duncan; HMS Ramillies
- Awards: Order of the Dannebrog (Denmark); Legion of Honour (France); Cross of Naval Merit (Spain)

Admiral Arthur Wartensleben Ewart (23 December 1862 – 18 November 1922) was a Royal Navy officer. A gunnery expert, from 1900 to 1903 Ewart served as the first British naval attaché in Berlin. After this he undertook a number of ship commands in the Channel Fleet and Atlantic Fleet. Promoted to rear-admiral in 1911, he retired because of ill-health in the same year.

== Early life ==
Arthur Wartensleben Ewart was the second son of General Sir John Ewart and Frances née Stone. He was born on 23 December 1862 in Sandgate, Kent. His elder brother followed his father into the British Army, becoming Lieutenant-General Sir Spencer Ewart.

== Military career ==
Ewart joined the Royal Navy on 15 January 1875, initially as a naval cadet, becoming a midshipman on 22 March 1877. He was promoted to sub-lieutenant on 23 December 1881, studying at the Royal Naval College, Greenwich. On 1 April 1883 he was appointed to serve on the training brig HMS Seaflower. He was advanced to lieutenant on 23 June, serving as a gunnery officer in the training ship HMS Excellent where he won the Goodenough Medal for the best performance in the gunnery course. Ewart was assigned to the troopship HMS Euphrates based at Portsmouth on 4 July the same year, but returned to Excellent on 30 September 1884. On 8 June 1886 he was appointed a gunnery staff officer in the training ships HMS Foudroyant and HMS Perseus.

Ewart's tenure at the training establishment was brief, joining the battleship HMS Colossus as gunnery officer on 6 December the same year. He then became the gunnery officer of the cruiser HMS Severn on 19 February 1889, serving on the China Station. Ewart returned to Excellent on 16 February 1892 as a senior staff officer there. Promoted to commander on 31 December 1895, he joined the cruiser HMS Grafton on 20 April the following year, serving on the China Station. Ewart subsequently joined the Naval Intelligence Department on 27 September 1899.

Ewart was appointed as the British naval attaché in Berlin on 6 October 1900. Described in reports as "very zealous and keen", he was the first person to hold the post, the Royal Navy having received permission to create it in July. While the reason for Ewart's selection is not recorded, he had German connections through his great-grandfather Joseph Ewart, a diplomat in Germany, who had married a daughter of the Graf von Wartensleben. For this he was looked upon favourably by Wilhelm II, who described him as "partially German". He was also a competent speaker of the German language. Ewart arrived in Berlin in November, tasked with assisting in the gathering of military intelligence.

Ewart was promoted to captain on 30 June 1901. In April 1902 he argued that the Imperial German Navy was being developed to match and defeat the Royal Navy, a point that had previously been disregarded by the Ambassador to Germany, Sir Frank Lascelles. On 12 June 1903 he wrote the first recorded attaché report on submarines, describing Germany's launch of Forelle. Four days later he provided a report summarising the superiority of German torpedo boats over British ones, but this was disregarded by naval authorities. Ewart was subsequently replaced by Captain Reginald Allenby who arrived in August.

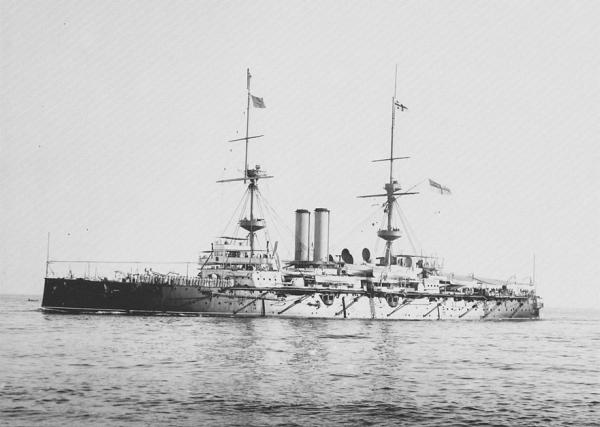
Ewart's last command HMS Ramillies

Ewart was moved to serve as the naval attaché at Copenhagen, where on 10 December he was created a Knight Commander, 2nd Class, of the Order of the Dannebrog. During his service he also received the French Legion of Honour and Spanish Cross of Naval Merit. He returned to regular naval duties in the following year, being appointed to command the cruiser HMS Doris on 10 June 1904, serving in the Channel Fleet. Doris was moved to join the Atlantic Fleet in 1905. In late 1906 Ewart and Doris assisted in the recovery of the main battery guns from the wrecked battleship HMS Montagu off Lundy Island. He was transferred to command the battleship HMS Duncan on 4 December, initially with the Channel Fleet and then again in the Atlantic. Duncan was one of several ships in July 1908 that travelled to Canada to participate in the Quebec Tercentenary celebrations. Ewart was then given command of the battleship HMS Ramillies on 2 February 1909. Part of the Home Fleet and based at Devonport, Ewart simultaneously commanded the Special Service Division of the fleet.

Ewart was promoted to rear-admiral on 15 March 1911, and placed on the list of retired officers on 15 May because of ill-health. He continued to be promoted, becoming a vice-admiral on 10 June 1916, and an admiral on 17 January 1919. Ewart died at Dumfries.

== Personal life ==
Ewart married Violet Louisa Haworth-Booth at the registry office in Beverley, Yorkshire, on 22 September 1903. She outlived him.
