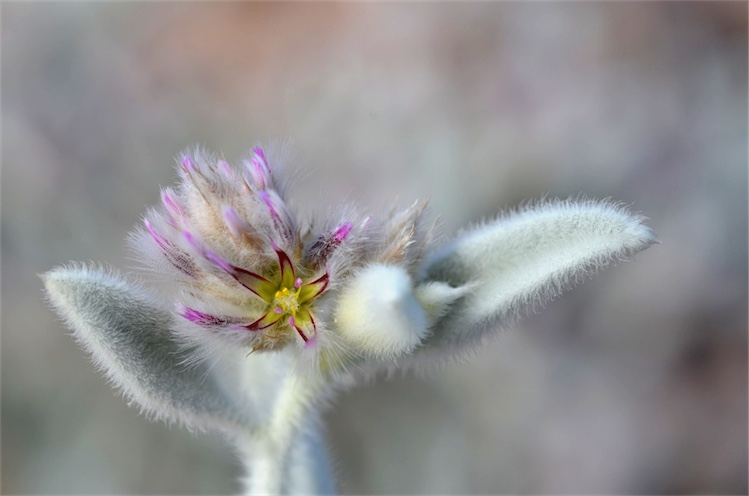

Scientific classification
- Kingdom: Plantae
- Clade: Tracheophytes
- Clade: Angiosperms
- Clade: Eudicots
- Order: Caryophyllales
- Family: Amaranthaceae
- Genus: Ptilotus
- Species: P. incanus

Binomial name
- Ptilotus incanus (R.Br.) Poir.

Synonyms
- List: Ptilotus helmsii F.Muell. & Tate ex Ewart & Jean White nom. inval., pro syn.; Ptilotus incanus var. elongatus Benl; Ptilotus incanus (R.Br.) Poir. var. incanus; Ptilotus incanus var. parviflorus (Ewart & Jean White) Benl; Ptilotus obovatus var. griseus Benl; Trichinium gnaphalodes A.Cunn. ex Moq.; Trichinium gnaphaloides A.D.Chapm. orth. var.; Trichinium incanum R.Br.; Trichinium incanum R.Br. var. incanum; Trichinium incanum var. parviflorum Ewart & Jean White

= Ptilotus incanus =

Species of herb

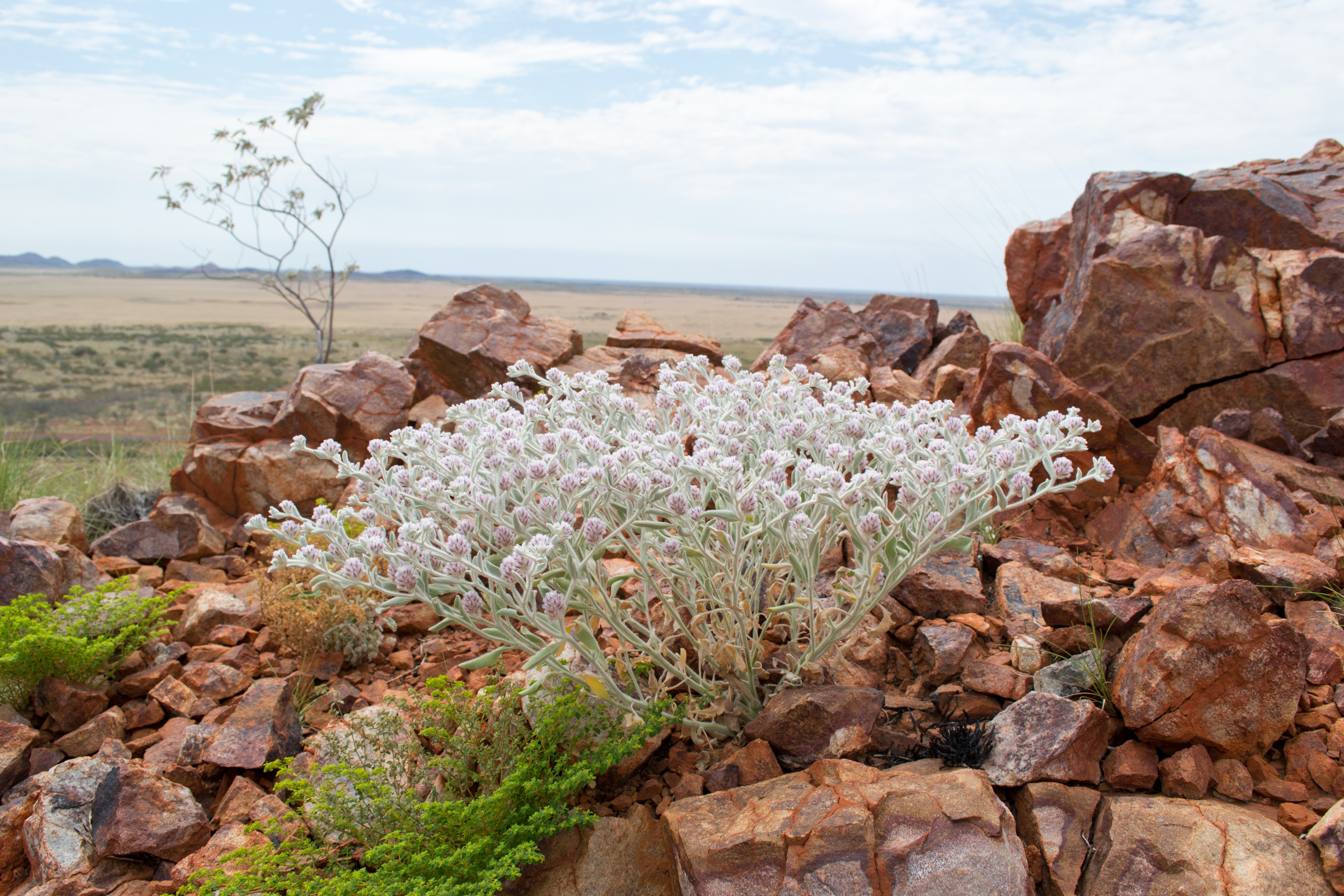
Habit on a hill in the Pilbara

Ptilotus incanus, commonly known as grey fox-tail, is a species of flowering plant in the family Amaranthaceae and is endemic to Australia. It is a soft, perennial herb or subshrub with hairy stems, elliptic to egg-shaped leaves and short cylindrical or hemispherical spikes of pink flowers.

== Description ==
Ptilotus incanus is a soft, perennial herb or subshrub, that typically grows to a height of 15–75 cm (5.9–29.5 in), its stems and leaves covered with whorled hairs. Its stem leaves are elliptic to egg-shaped, sometimes with the narrower end towards the base, mostly 7–60 mm (0.28–2.36 in) long and 5–18 mm (0.20–0.71 in) wide. There are no leaves at the base of the plant. The flowers are arranged in short cylindrical to hemispherical spikes with hairy bracts 5–6 mm (0.20–0.24 in) long and similar bracteoles 4.8–5.2 mm (0.19–0.20 in) long. The outer tepals are 6.5–9.5 mm (0.26–0.37 in) long and the inner tepals 6.0–8.5 mm (0.24–0.33 in) long with a tuft of hairs on the inner surface. The style is 3.5–3.8 mm (0.14–0.15 in) long and fixed to the side of the ovary. Flowering occurs from June to August.

== Taxonomy ==
This species was first formally described in 1810 by Robert Brown who gave it the name Trichinium incanum in his Prodromus Florae Novae Hollandiae et Insulae Van Diemen. In 1816, Jean Louis Marie Poiret transferred the species to Ptilotus as P. incanus in the Encyclopédie Méthodique, Botanique. The specific epithet (incanus) means 'grey' or 'hoary'.

== Distribution and habitat ==
Ptilotus incanus grows in sandy soils on rocky outcrops, scree slopes and hills, in the north of Western Australia, the southern half of the Northern Territory, the north-west of South Australia and western Queensland.

== Conservation status ==
Ptilotus incanus is listed as "not threatened" by the Government of Western Australia, Department of Biodiversity, Conservation and Attractions, and of "least concern" under the Northern Territory Government Territory Parks and Wildlife Conservation Act and the Queensland Government Nature Conservation Act 1992.

== See also ==
- List of Ptilotus species
