= Forel =

Forel may refer to:

- Auguste-Henri Forel (1848–1931), Swiss myrmecologist
- François-Alphonse Forel (1841–1912), Swiss hydrologist
- Several communes in Switzerland:
  - Forel, Fribourg
  - Forel, Vaud
  - Forel-sur-Lucens, Vaud
- The Forelle, a pear cultivar
- Russian submarine Forel
