= Wellington Hospital, New Zealand =

Coordinates: 41°18′31″S 174°46′46″E

Wellington Hospital
- Te Whatu Ora
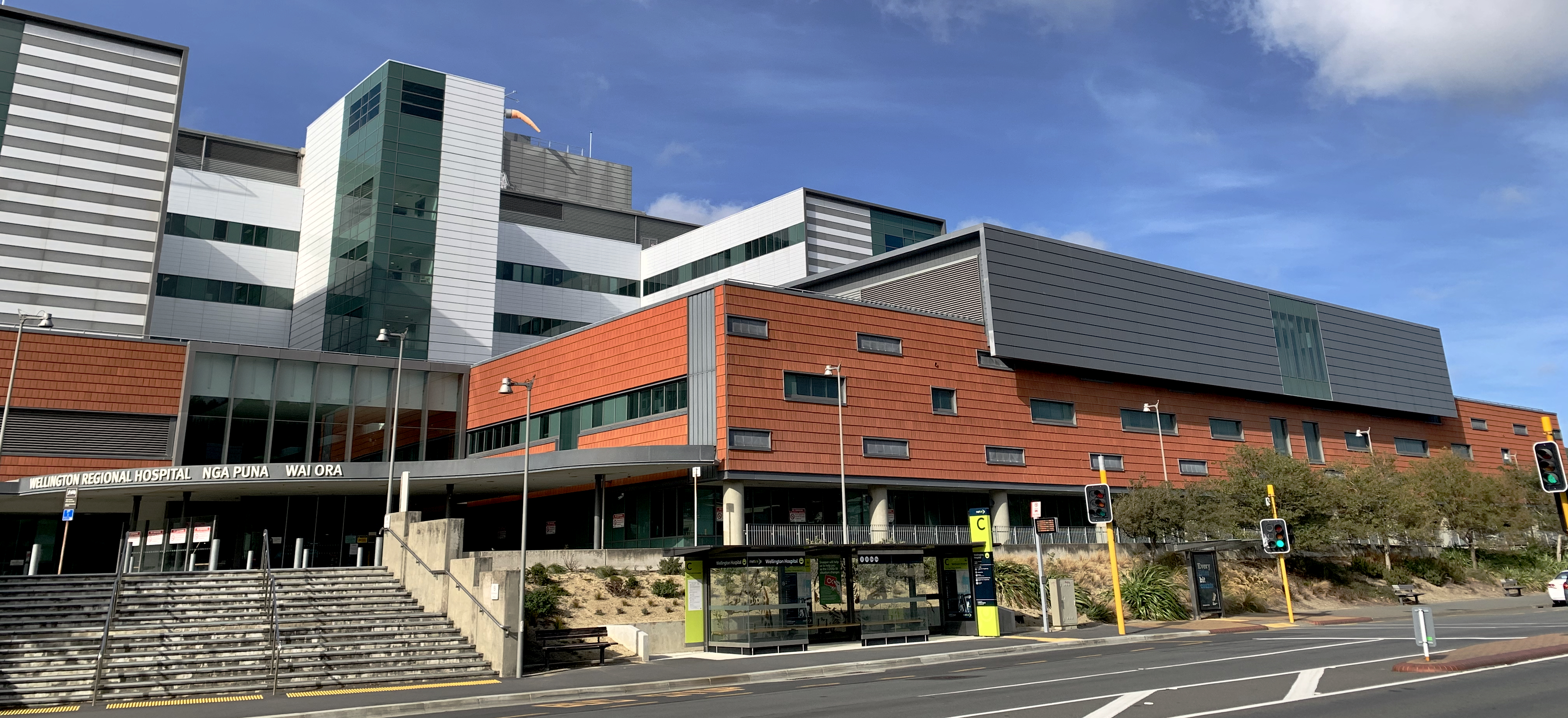
- Wellington Regional Hospital main building in April 2020

Geography
- Location: Newtown, Wellington, New Zealand

Services
- Emergency department: Yes

Helipads
- Helipad: ICAO: NZWH

History
- Founded: September 1847

Links
- Website: Official website
- Lists: Hospitals in New Zealand

Wellington Hospital, also known as Wellington Regional Hospital, is the main hospital in Wellington, New Zealand, located south of the city centre in the suburb of Newtown. It is the main hospital run by Te Whatu Ora, Capital, Coast and Hutt Valley (formerly Capital & Coast District Health Board).

The hospital serves Wellington City, Porirua and the Kāpiti Coast District. Lower Hutt and Upper Hutt have a separate hospital, Hutt Hospital, in the Lower Hutt suburb of Boulcott.

Wellington Hospital is the Wellington Region's main tertiary hospital, with services such as complex specialist and acute (or "tertiary") services, procedures and treatments such as the Intensive Care Unit, cardiac surgery, cancer care, cardiology procedures, neurosurgery, and renal care. The hospital is a tertiary referral centre for the lower half of the North Island and the top of the South Island (specifically the Hawke's Bay, Manawatū-Whanganui, Wellington, Tasman, Nelson and Marlborough regions), and for the Chatham Islands.

It is affiliated with the University of Otago, Wellington, and the medical and health sciences campus is situated adjacent to the main hospital buildings in Mein St.

== Services ==
=== Main hospital ===
Wellington Hospital has 484 beds, and provides children's, maternity, surgical and medical services.

=== Mental Health Services ===
Wellington Hospital Mental Health Services is a separate mental health facility on the hospital campus with 29 beds.

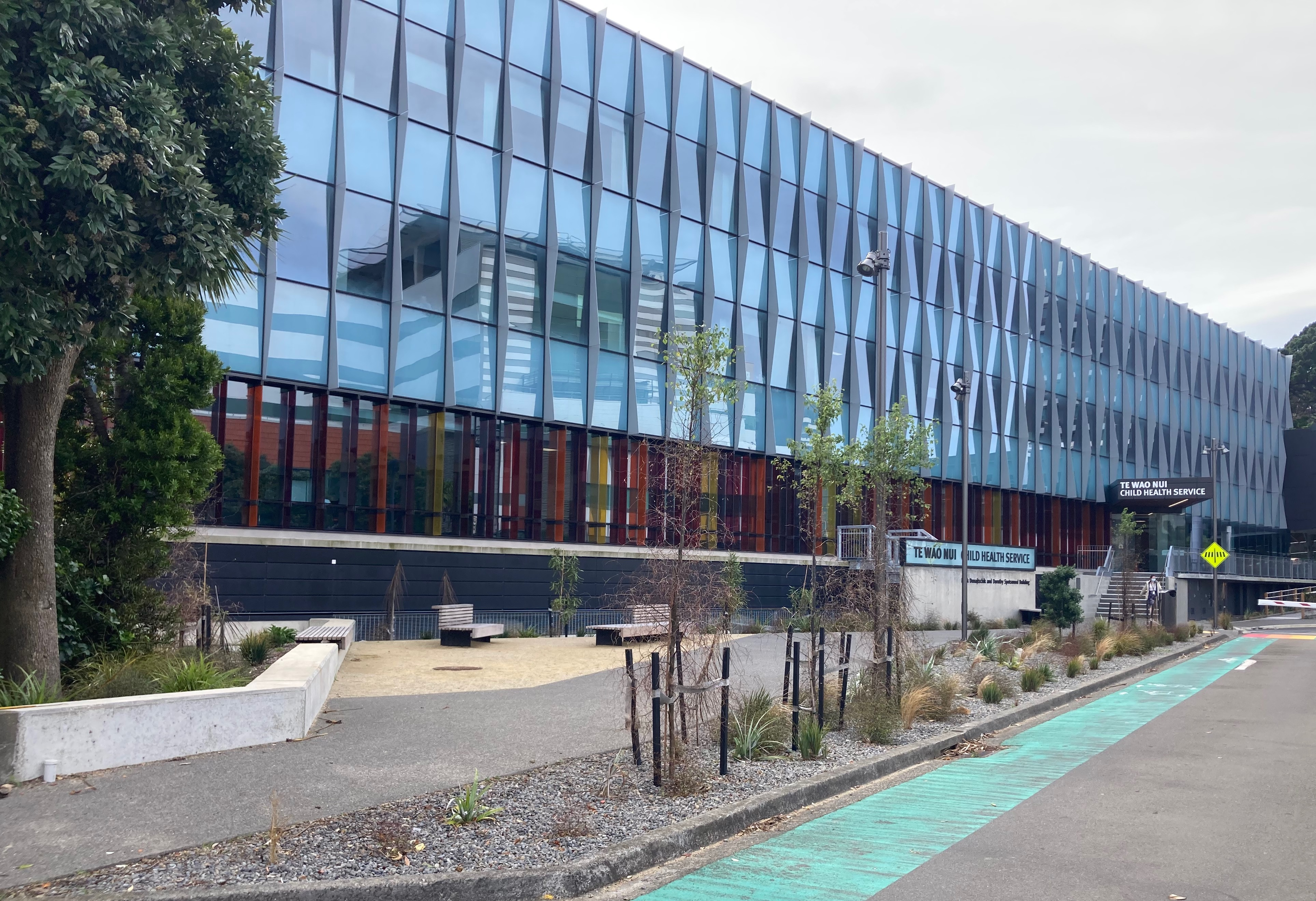
Te Wao Nui, April 2023

=== Te Wao Nui – Child Health Service ===
Te Wao Nui – Child Health Service is housed in the Mark Dunajtschik and Dorothy Spotswood Building which opened on 30 September 2022. The building houses 50 inpatient beds across children's medical and surgical wards, a short-stay unit, outpatient clinics and day units, and is connected to the main hospital via linkbridge.

=== Emergency Department ===
The Emergency Department is located on Riddiford St.

== History ==
=== 1880s–1920 ===
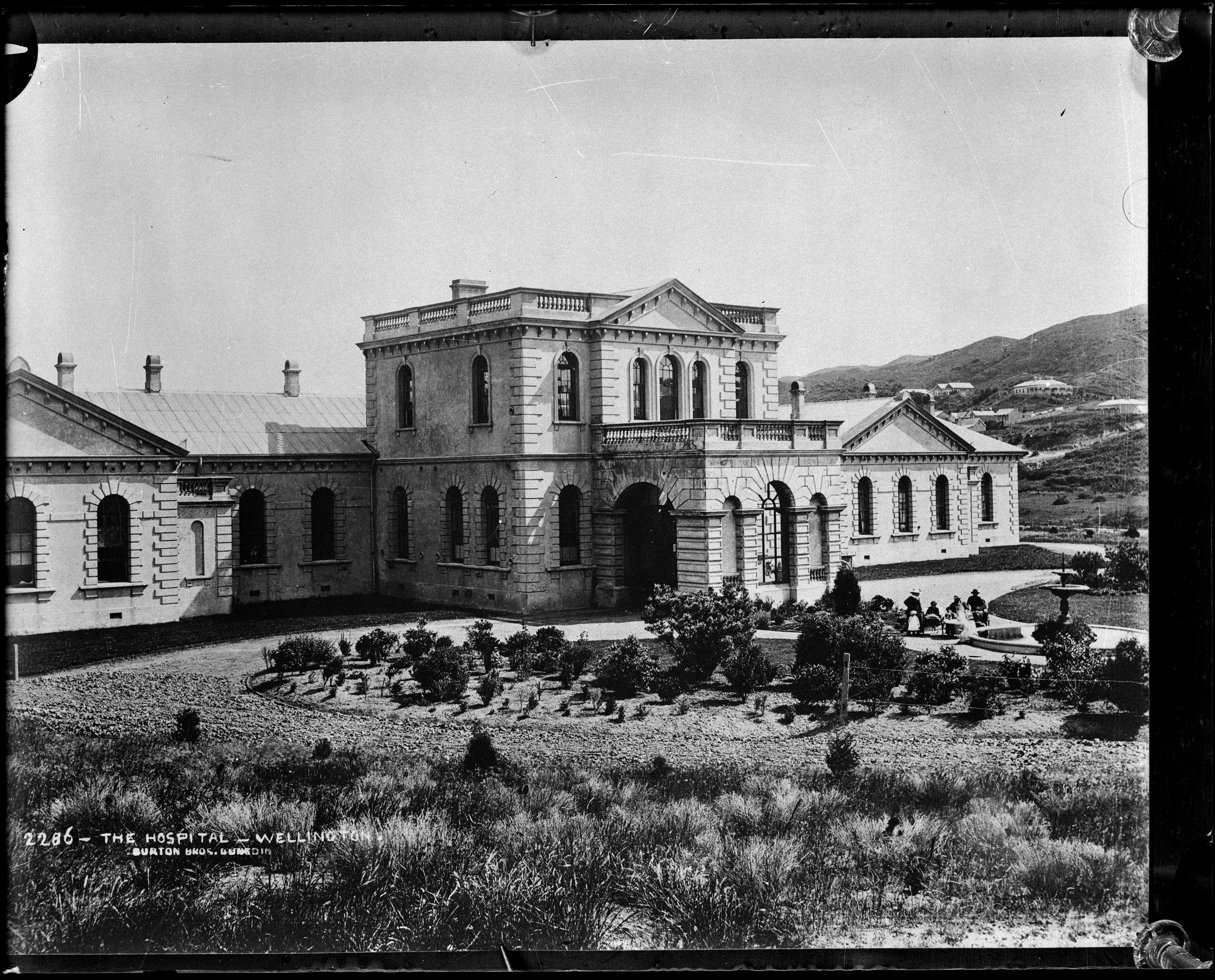
The original Newtown hospital

The first hospital in Wellington, the Colonial Hospital, was established in Thorndon in 1847 on the site of what is now Wellington Girls' College. John Fitzgerald was the hospital's first physician. Built to address the needs of both Māori and pākehā it was one of the first four hospitals established by Governor George Grey. A new hospital was designed by architect Christian Toxward and construction of the hospital in Newtown began in 1876 using prison labour; it was opened in 1881. Mental health patients were housed in a hospital at Mt View (now Government House) until a new asylum opened at Porirua in 1900.

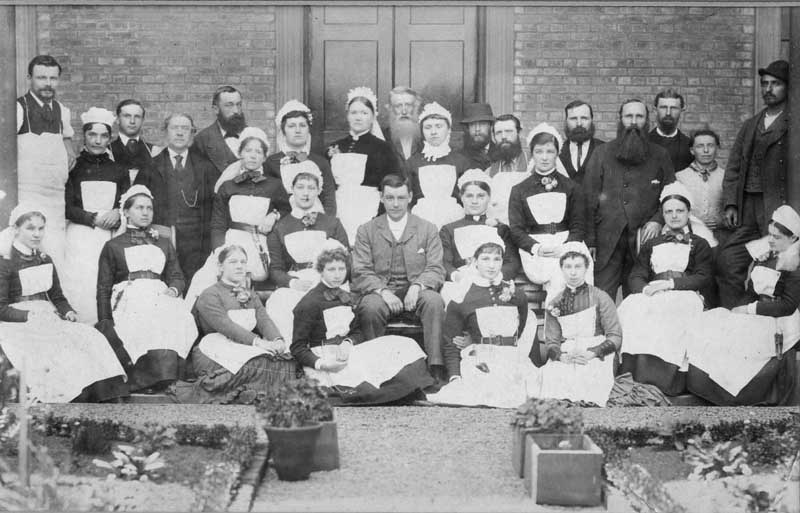
Staff of Wellington Hospital in 1885

Between 1881 and 1912 the hospital expanded its services with six new buildings. The Victoria Operating Theatres opened in 1901. In 1904 a nurse's home opened and was enlarged in 1907 to accommodate 96 nurses. The Victoria Hospital for chronic conditions opened in 1905. In 1906 concern over the spread of tuberculosis (TB) and its treatment led to the opening of the Seddon ward chalets. Recognition of the need for an isolation ward to care for people with infectious diseases resulted in the acquisition of land off Coromandel St in Newtown and the opening of the first Fever Hospital in 1910. It was named the Ewart Hospital after medical superintendent John Ewart; a new Fever Hospital was built in 1919.

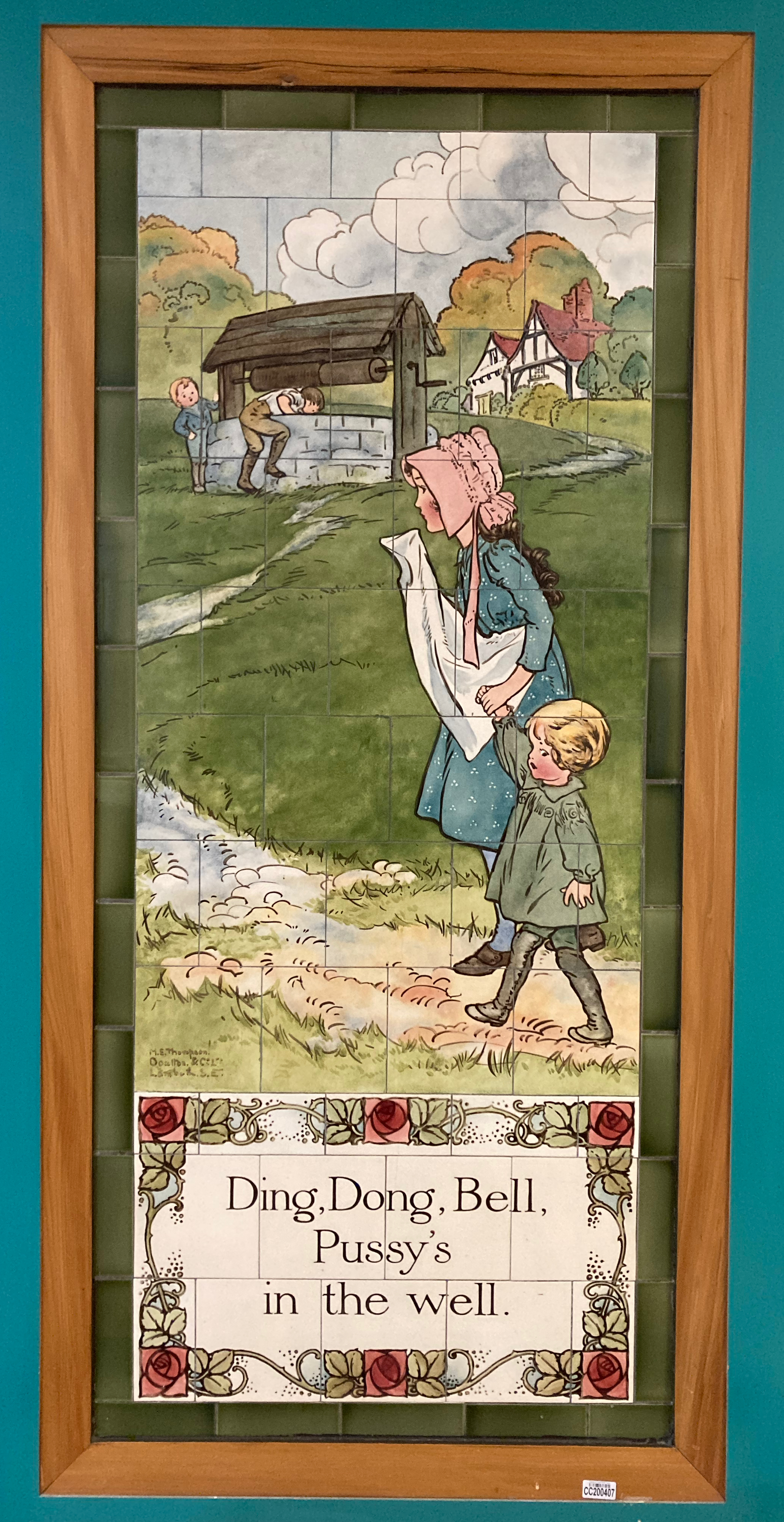
Nursery rhyme tile

A children's hospital, the King Edward VII Memorial Hospital, opened in 1912. It was funded by the government and public fundraising. The amount raised by the public was due in part to antagonism between a Presbyterian minister, the Rev. James Gibb and an actor Hugh Ward; Gibb objected to the play The Girl from Rector's being staged by Ward and in response Ward offered to personally donate to the hospital fund and add the takings from performances if citizens also donated. His strategy was so successful that there were excess funds which were used to purchase 18 nursery rhyme murals made of picture tiles; these were the work of artists Margaret E. Thompson and William Rowe and made by Royal Doulton in London. They cost £800 at the time (equivalent to NZD $70,000 in 2026).

Under the Hospital and Charitable Institutions Act 1909 the Wellington Hospital Board was established in 1913 and the first elections to the board held.

During World War I hospital facilities were severely strained by several factors: soldiers from the Trentham Military Camp needing treatment for infectious diseases; war casualties; staff shortages as staff enlisted to serve in the war and the 1918 flu epidemic.

=== 1920s–1940s ===
After World War I the hospital developed and expanded a number of specialist departments and therapies: tuberculosis, psychiatry, cancer, an ante-natal clinic, urogenital and urology departments, a skin diseases clinic, orthopaedic surgery, a venereal disease clinic and cardiology clinic. In 1924 the foundation stone was laid for a new administration building on Riddiford St, which opened in 1927. Janet Fraser, wife of the future prime minister Peter Fraser, served on the Board from 1925 to 1935.

The hospital experienced severe financial difficulties in the depression. It was overcrowded and while new buildings were planned further building programmes did not proceed due to political wrangling during the late 1930s. During the war the hospital experienced waiting lists, a shortage of staff and an influx of military patients; a soldiers' ward block was opened in 1941. A new building, known as the 210 block, was completed in 1944 which reduced overcrowding. The hospital celebrated its centenary in 1947.

=== 1950s–1970s ===
From the 1950s to 1970s various plans were proposed for redevelopment of the hospital. One proposed a 1200-bed hospital while another planned an 800-bed hospital. Several factors had to be considered in redevelopment. New specialties needed to be accommodated: neurology, coronary care, renal dialysis, respiratory research, vascular surgery, radiotherapy and nuclear medicine. Care in the community and district nursing expanded. There was the projected population and needs of the Hutt Valley, Porirua and the Kāpiti area and the inclusion of a clinical school to train medical students. The decision to create a University of Otago clinical school was preceded by lobbying for a third medical school attached to Victoria University.

In the late 1950s there was such an urgent need for new operating theatres and beds for surgical patients that a new building with these facilities opened. The new theatres enabled expansion of cardiothoracic surgical services. Two nurses' homes also opened in 1949 and 1958. A new block, the 150 bed Seddon block opened in 1966 replacing the old Seddon ward chalets. It was intended that this be a chest hospital to relieve pressure on Ewart hospital but as the numbers of TB patients had significantly declined the new block was used for cardiac, renal, cardiothoracic surgical and other medical patients.

Three further buildings opened in the 1970s: the Academic block serving as the clinical school in 1977; the Clinical Services building in 1978; the Grace Neill block, named after nurse Grace Neill, providing obstetric and gynaecology services in 1978.

=== 1980s–1990s ===
The Ward support and Link blocks opened in 1980. Construction of new buildings required demolition of many of the older hospital buildings including the original 1881 building. The King Edward VII Memorial Hospital was demolished when a new children's hospital opened in 1988. The removal and preservation of the nursery rhyme tiles from the old building required considerable technical skills. Some tiles did not survive but the some were re-erected by the Wellington Hospital Royal Doulton Mural Preservation Trust Inc. in 1992 in the new children's hospital and the remainder later in 2009 in the corridor linking the Regional Hospital and Clinical Services buildings. The Seddon block was also demolished in 1999.

=== 2000s ===
A new emergency department (ED) opened in 2000. In 2023 the government announced plans for a new ED which would create up-to-date facilities in a larger building.

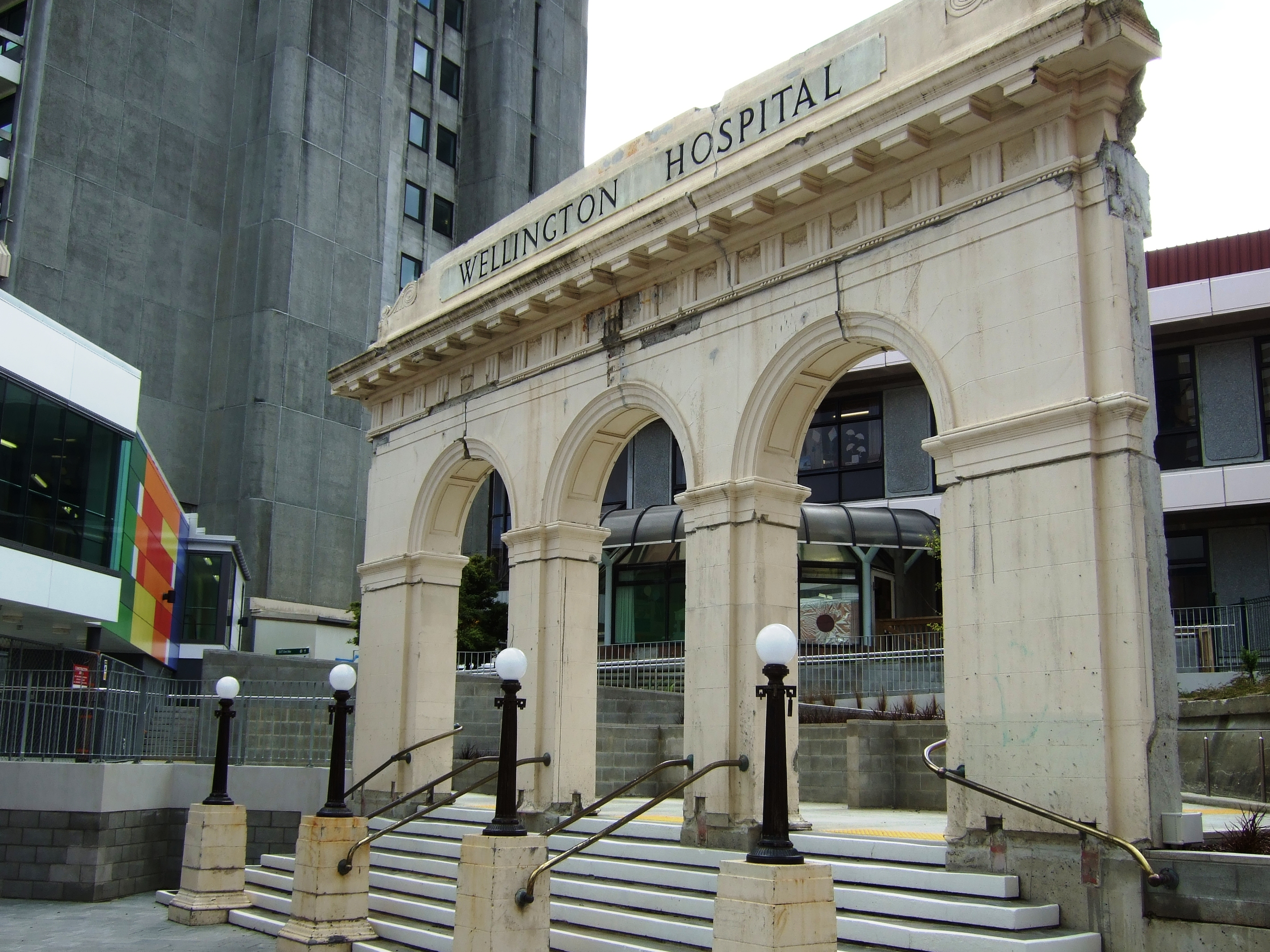
Frontage of demolished 1927 building in 2009

In May 2002, the Government approved the new regional hospital (NRH) Project, a major redevelopment of the hospital. The project centred on a new main building, including a new state-of-the-art 18-bed Intensive Care Unit, a new operating theatre complex, and uniting the medical and surgical wards into a single building. Construction began in 2004 with demolition and clearing of the site. This included demolishing the 1940s 210 block and the 1927 Front Block, from which the entrance arches and steps were preserved and reinstated at the back of the new building. Construction was completed in 2008 and the new hospital was officially opened by Governor-General Anand Satyanand on 6 March 2009. In early 2010 Prince William visited children in the hospital.

In September 2022 a new child health service Te Wao Nui opened in the Mark Dunajtschik and Dorothy Spotswood Building. Local property developers Mark Dunajtschik and Dorothy Spotswood donated $53 million towards construction of the new building. The building won awards from the New Zealand Institute of Architects and the Property Council in 2023.

Both the main hospital building and the child health services building have base isolators to minimise damage during an earthquake.

In May 2025, Health Minister Simeon Brown and Finance Minister Nicola Willis announced that the New Zealand Government would invest in 126 additional beds and treatment spaces at Wellington Hospital.

=== Nurses' Memorial Chapel ===
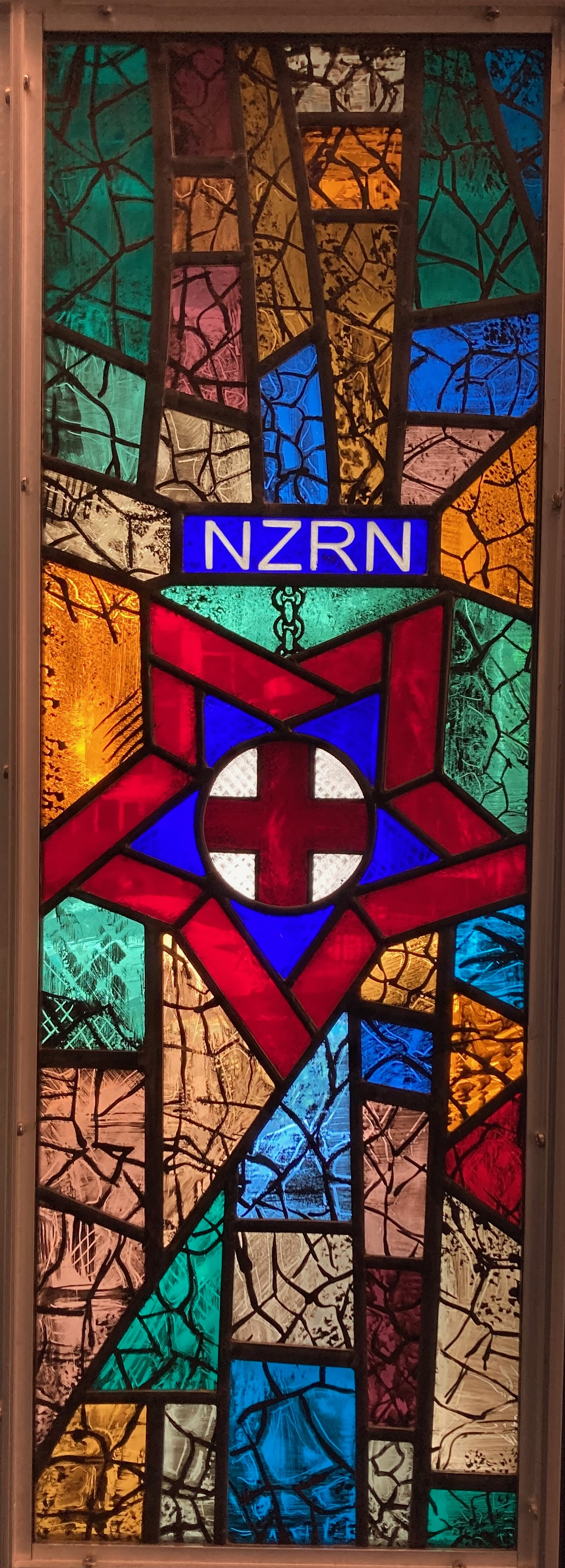
Stained glass window in chapel, 2023

The Nurses' Memorial Chapel was only one of three chapels in New Zealand dedicated to the memory of nurses, the other two being at Christchurch Hospital and Waikato Hospital.

Planning for a Nurses' Memorial Chapel began in 1933 and extensive fundraising commenced in 1934 using the profit from a nursing reunion. Donations of money were received from individuals, patients, bequests, community appeals and house-to-house collections. By 1961 £28,000 had been raised (equivalent to NZD $810,000 in 2026), enough to allow architects to draw up plans and to accept a tender for construction. In addition to raising funds to construct the chapel many of the fixtures and fittings, such as pews, kneelers, a lecturn and font, were also donated.

The foundation stone was laid in November 1964 on a site south of the nurses' homes, close to Riddiford St. The chapel was opened on 30 October 1965 by the Governor General Sir Bernard Fergusson's wife, Lady Laura Fergusson.

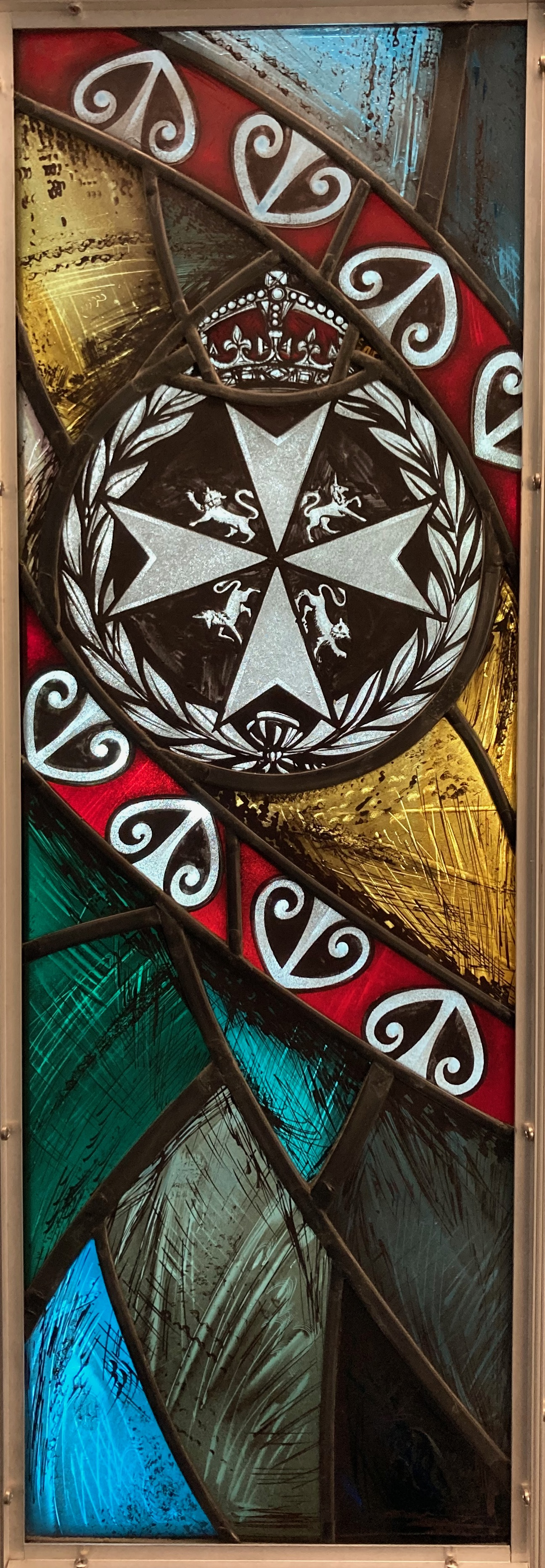
St John Ambulance stained glass window in chapel, 2023

A notable feature of the building was the stained-glass windows in the north wall designed by Beverley Shore Bennett and Martin Roestenburg. In 1965 when the chapel opened the 72 windows were filled with coloured glass but by 2001 this was replaced in 51 windows by stained-glass designs. The subjects of and depictions in the windows were varied: saints and apostles, Saint Fabiola, Florence Nightingale's lamp, the New Zealand Registered Nurses (NZRN) badge, the staff and snake of Asclepius, the original hospital at Pipitea St, the 1981 centennial of the hospital, the centenary of the School of Nursing in 1983, and the St John Ambulance which incorporated Māori kowhaiwhai pattern and the mangopare (hammerhead shark) motif. Many of the windows were dedicated to former staff of the hospital.

The chapel was well-used for services attended by both staff and patients, and as a place for quiet reflection. However the number of religious services declined over the years and in 2000 the chapel became a Nursing Education Centre.

The chapel was demolished in 2004 to make way for redevelopment on the hospital site. The stained-glass windows were removed before demolition and stored until 2010 when most were re-installed by Olaf Wehr-Candler in the chapel in the new hospital building.

== Notable staff ==
- Eric Anson, anaesthetist
- Campbell Begg, doctor
- Agnes Bennett, one of the first women doctors
- Charles Burns, doctor
- John Cairney (anatomist), medical superintendent
- Ellen Dougherty, nurse
- James Elliott, first house surgeon and later surgeon
- John Ewart, medical superintendent
- Truby King, medical superintendent
- Kate Marsden, matron
- Nina Muir, first woman house surgeon
- Grace Neill, nurse
- Daisy Platts-Mills, one of the first women doctors

== See also ==
- Hospitals in the Wellington Region
