= Nina Muir =

New Zealand doctor

Nina Catherine Muir (20 October 1900 – 9 June 1981) was a New Zealand medical doctor. She studied medicine at the University of Otago, graduating in 1926, and in 1927 became the first woman house surgeon at Wellington Hospital. Muir also worked in Gisborne, and later qualified in obstetrics and gynaecology at the Rotunda Hospital in Dublin. In the 1940s, Muir was president of the East Coast branch of the British Medical Association.

== Early life ==
Nina Muir (née Howard) was born in Dunedin, New Zealand in 1900. Her father was Dr Ernest Henry Howard (d. 1954) who practised in Murchison and Taumarunui where he was superintendent of the hospital. Muir went to school at Auckland Girls' Grammar School where she was joint head girl. During the influenza pandemic of 1918–1919, Muir and other senior students helped with the sick; she credits her interest in medicine as a career to the fact the first body she encountered was that of a school friend. Muir attended the University of Auckland to complete her medical intermediate exams. She graduated from the University of Otago medical school in 1926.

== Career ==
In 1927, Muir became the first woman house surgeon at Wellington Hospital. She became a senior house surgeon at Cook Hospital in Gisborne in 1928. At Cook Hospital and Te Puia Hospital she attended births and treated patients in remote areas. After her marriage she became the first general practitioner to practise in the maternity unit of Cook Hospital. In 1949–1950 she did a postgraduate diploma in obstetrics and gynaecology at the Rotunda Hospital in Dublin.

During the 1940s, Muir was the president of the East Coast branch of the British Medical Association.

== Personal life ==
In 1929, she married Percy Rutherford Muir, a Gisborne journalist and printer, whose family owned the Poverty Bay Herald. They had two daughters.

Muir died in Gisborne in 1981.
