= Spencer Ewart =

British Army general (1861–1930)

Lieutenant-general Sir Spencer Ewart KCB
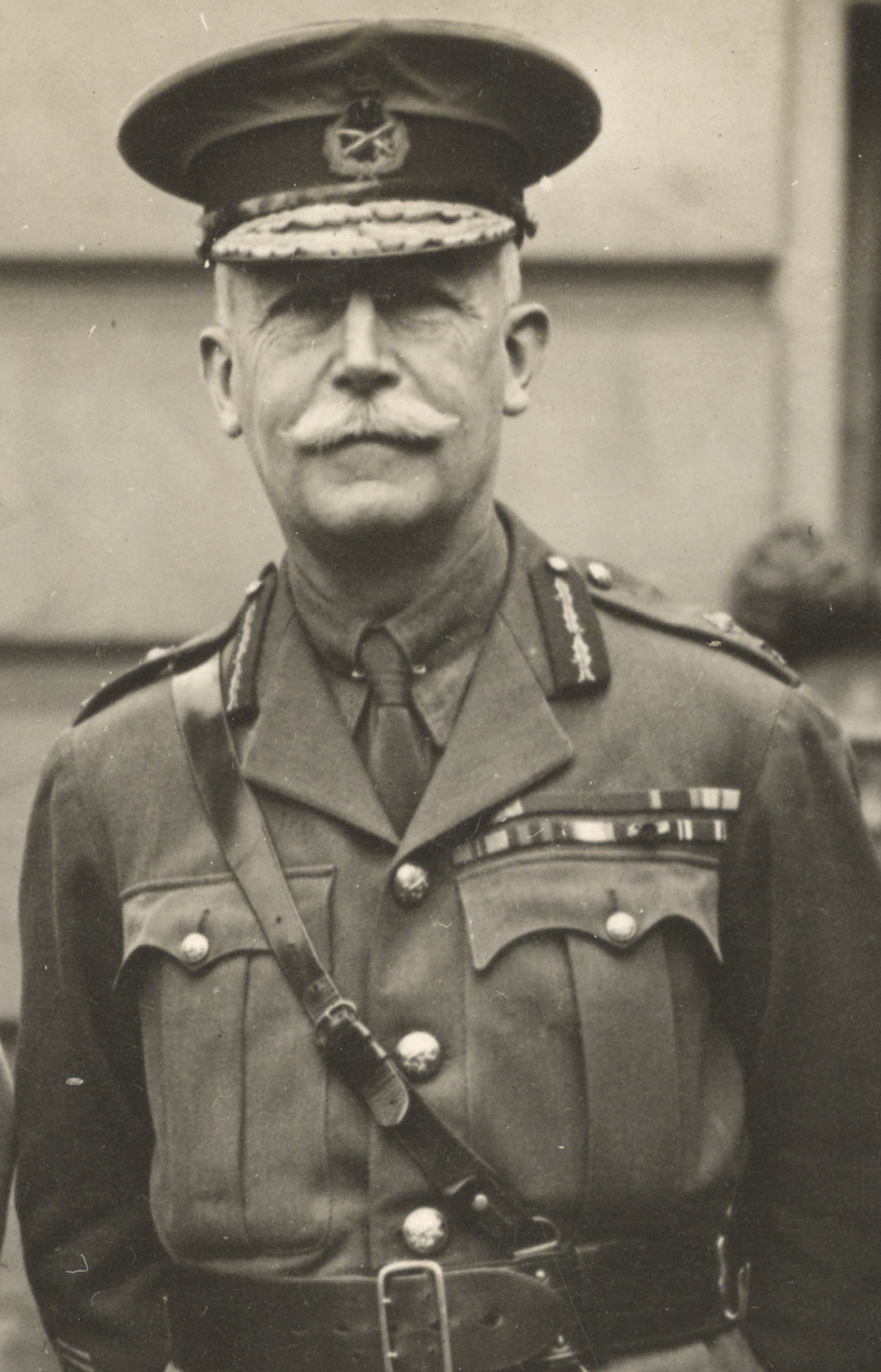
- Born: John Spencer Ewart; 22 March 1861; Tatenhill, Staffordshire, England
- Died: 19 September 1930 (aged 69); Langholm, Dumfriesshire, Scotland
- Military career
- Allegiance: United Kingdom
- Branch: British Army
- Rank: Lieutenant-general
- Commands: Scottish Command
- Conflicts: Battle of Tel el-Kebir; Second Boer War; First World War
- Awards: Knight Commander of the Order of the Bath

Lieutenant-general Sir John Spencer Ewart KCB (22 March 1861 – 19 September 1930) was a British Army officer who became Adjutant-General to the Forces, but was forced to resign over the Curragh Incident.

== Early life and education ==
Ewart was born in Tatenhill near Burton-on-Trent into a distinguished Scottish family of military officers, the second son of General Sir John Alexander Ewart and Frances Stone. His father was aide-de-camp to Queen Victoria and a veteran of the Crimean War and Siege of Lucknow who lost his left arm at Cawnpore. His father was the son of Lieutenant-general John Frederick Ewart and grandson of diplomat Joseph Ewart and Sir Charles Brisbane. His uncles included Lieutenant-general Charles Brisbane Ewart and Vice-admiral Charles Joseph Frederic Ewart, and his younger brother was Admiral Arthur Wartensleben Ewart.

He was educated at Marlborough College and the Royal Military College, Sandhurst.

== Military career ==
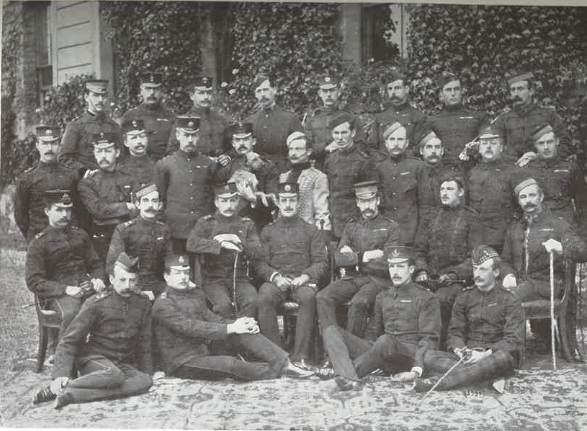
The Staff College, Camberley class in 1890. Stood in the back row, second from the right, is J. S. Ewart.

Spencer Ewart was commissioned into the Queen's Own Cameron Highlanders in October 1881.

He served with his regiment in Egypt and fought at the Battle of Tel el-Kebir in 1882. He was also involved in the Nile Expedition in 1884 and served with the Sudan Frontier Field Force from 1885 to 1886.

He attended the Staff College, Camberley from 1890–91 and later served as a staff officer in the Second Boer War in South Africa, and returned to the United Kingdom in July 1902, a few weeks after the end of the war in May. The commander-in-chief in South Africa, Major General Lord Kitchener, wrote in a despatch in June 1902 how Ewart was "a Staff officer of considerable ability. He has rendered good service in connection with the distribution and movements of troops." For his service he was created a Companion of the Order of the Bath (CB) in the October 1902 South Africa Honours list.

After his return from South Africa, he was appointed assistant military secretary and received the substantive rank of colonel on 15 October 1902, then was appointed deputy military secretary on 20 January 1903. In 1904 he was appointed as military secretary and in October 1906, after being promoted to major general, moved on to be director of military operations (DMO) at the War Office, taking over from Major General James Grierson. Winston Churchill, president of the board of trade, was willing to help him with economic intelligence on Germany. However, in 1909 Ewart wrote in his private diary:

It is dreadful to think that we have such men in the Cabinet as Winston Churchill and Lloyd George. The one a half-bred American, the other a silly sentimental Celt.

He thought that they produced “Torrents of scurrilous and socialist oratory”.

In August 1910, Ewart, who the month before was made aide-de-camp general to King George V, was appointed Adjutant-General to the Forces, in succession to General Sir Ian Hamilton. In June 1911 he was promoted to lieutenant general. In March 1914, with the Ulster Protestants on the verge of armed rebellion against planned Irish Home Rule, he was one of those who drew up the proposals that officers with personal links to Ulster would be permitted to absent themselves from planned troop deployments into Ulster, but that other officers who refused to go would be dismissed. Although no direct orders had yet been issued, when told of the plans officers of Hubert Gough's cavalry brigade stationed at the Curragh Camp near Dublin threatened to resign their commissions or accept dismissal rather than obey (the Curragh Incident). Along with the Secretary of State for War J.E.B. Seely and the CIGS Sir John French (who had then promised Gough in writing that the Army would not be used against Ulster) Ewart was forced to resign, both for having helped to create the situation in which officers were allowed to discuss which hypothetical (but lawful) orders they would choose to obey, and for being involved with the subsequent promises made to Gough in London. Ewart was also an Aide-de-Camp General to King George V from 1910 to 1914.

Ewart was appointed general officer commanding Scottish Command on 5 May 1914, a post he held until 1918, taking over this post from Lieutenant General Sir James Wolfe Murray. During the summer of 1915 Ewart was considered for command of the planned Suvla Bay Landings, which aimed to break the deadlock at Gallipoli. The Mediterranean Expeditionary Force commander, General Sir Ian Hamilton, rejected him for being too “stout of girth” to negotiate the front-line trenches which Hamilton had recently inspected, and for having had no direct contact with troops for fifteen years, despite Hamilton having urged him “as a friend” to do so for the sake of his career. The only other available general of appropriate seniority was Frederick Stopford, who was to prove inadequate for the task. He had in October 1914 succeeded Hamilton as colonel of the Queen's Own Cameron Highlanders.

Ewart retired from the army, after almost forty years of service, in March 1920.

== Personal life ==
In 1891, Ewart married Susan Frances Platt, the daughter of Major George William Platt, formerly of Dunallan House, Bridge of Allan. They had one daughter, Marion Frances Ewart, who in 1919 married Captain Ian Munro of the Cameron Highlanders.

He died at his seat, Craigeleuch, in Langholm, Dumfriesshire.

== Books ==
- George, Cassar (1977). Kitchener: Architect of Victory. HarperCollins. ISBN 0-71830-335-0.
- John, Lee (2001) [2000]. A Soldier's Life: General Sir Ian Hamilton 1853 to 1947. Pan. ISBN 0-33048-400-1.
- Toye, Richard (2008). Lloyd George and Churchill: Rivals for Greatness. London: Pan Macmillan. ISBN 978-0-330-43472-0.

Military offices
Preceded by Sir Ronald Lane	Military Secretary; 1904–1906	Succeeded by Sir Arthur Wynne
Preceded by James Grierson	Director of Military Operations; 1906–1910	Succeeded by Henry Wilson
Preceded by Sir Ian Hamilton	Adjutant General; 1910–1914	Succeeded by Sir Henry Sclater
Preceded by Sir James Wolfe Murray	GOC-in-C Scottish Command; 1914–1918	Succeeded by Sir Frederick McCracken
