= Ronald Lane =

British Army general

Major-General Sir Ronald Lane KCB KCVO DL
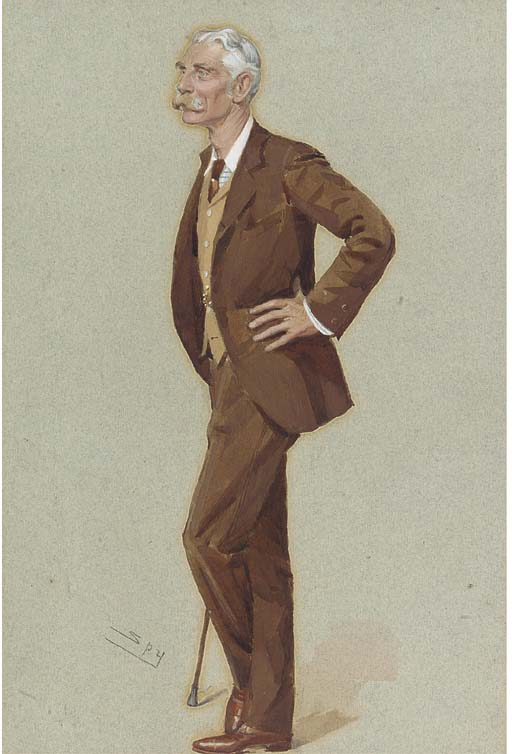
- Born: Ronald Bertram Lane; 19 February 1847; Kings Bromley, Staffordshire, England
- Died: 7 March 1937 (aged 90); Saxmundham, Suffolk
- Military career
- Allegiance: United Kingdom
- Branch: British Army
- Service years: 1867–1909
- Rank: Major-General
- Commands: Garrison at Alexandria; Infantry Brigade at Malta
- Conflicts: Anglo-Egyptian War
- Awards: Knight Commander of the Order of the Bath; Knight Commander of the Royal Victorian Order

Major-General Sir Ronald Bertram Lane, KCB, KCVO, DL (19 February 1847 – 7 March 1937) was a British Army officer who became Military Secretary.

== Early life ==
Lane was born at Kings Bromley Manor, Lichfield, Staffordshire, in 1847, the youngest son and 10th child of John Newton Lane and Hon. Agnes Bagot, second daughter of William Bagot, 2nd Baron Bagot.

== Military career ==
Lane was commissioned into the Rifle Brigade in 1867. He was appointed Deputy Assistant Adjutant and Quartermaster-General in Natal in 1891, Aide-de-Camp to the Duke of Connaught as Commander of the Guards' Brigade in Egypt in 1882 and Assistant Military Secretary in Canada in 1883. He went on to be Assistant Military Secretary at Headquarters in 1892, Aide-de-camp to the Duke of Cambridge as Commander-in-Chief in 1889 and Commander of the Garrison at Alexandria in 1898. In December 1901 he was appointed Commander of the Infantry Brigade at Malta, and he served as administrator of the government during the absence of the Governor, Sir Francis Grenfell, in July 1902. His last appointments were as Military Secretary at Headquarters in 1903 and Lieutenant-Governor and Secretary of the Royal Hospital Chelsea in 1905 before retiring in 1909.

In retirement he became Chairman of the Southern Alberta Land Company in Canada. On 15 March 1920, he was appointed a deputy lieutenant of Suffolk.

== Personal life ==
In 1893, he married Augusta Sarah Beaumont, daughter of John Augustus Beaumont, developer of Wimbledon Park. Their only child, Captain George Ronald Lane, was in the Coldstream Guards and fell in action in the Battle of the Somme in 1916.

He died at the age of 90 at Carlton Hall, Saxmundham.

Military offices
Preceded by Sir Ian Hamilton	Military Secretary; 1903–1904	Succeeded by Sir Spencer Ewart
