= Ferdinand Ewert Building =

- U.S. National Register of Historic Places
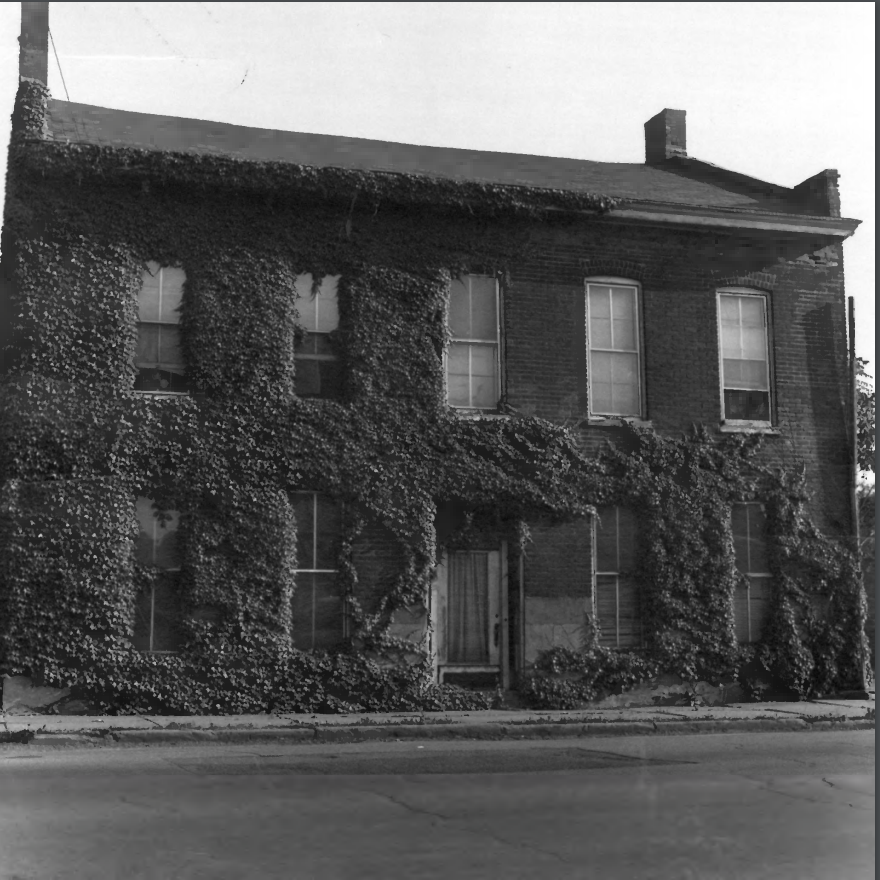
- Ferdinand Ewert Building

- Location within Iowa Location within the United States
- Location: 1107 W. 2nd St. Davenport, Iowa
- Coordinates: 41°31′16″N 90°35′21″W
- Area: less than one acre
- Built: 1852
- Architectural style: Vernacular
- MPS: Davenport MRA
- NRHP reference No.: 83002425
- Added to NRHP: July 7, 1983

The Ferdinand Ewert Building was a historic row house located in the West End of Davenport, Iowa, United States. It was a Vernacular style building that featured elements of both the Federal and Greek Revival styles. This combination was one of the architectural trends toward the end of Davenport's settlement period. It followed a simple form with frontal symmetry and parapet gable ends. This house was probably built by Gottlieb Wedige right after this section of the city was platted in 1852. Ferdinand Ewert, a teamster who lived across the street, bought it in 1871. The building was listed on the National Register of Historic Places in 1983, and has subsequently been torn down.
