= Billy Hole =

Welsh footballer (1897–1983)

Personal information
- Birth name: William James Hole
- Date of birth: 1 November 1897
- Place of birth: Swansea, Wales
- Date of death: 7 December 1983 (aged 86)
- Place of death: Wales

International career
| Years | Team | Apps | (Gls) |
| 1921–1928 | Wales | 9 | (1) |

Billy Hole (1 November 1897 – 7 December 1983) was a Welsh footballer. He was part of the Wales national team between 1921 and 1928, playing nine matches and scoring one goal. He played his first match on 9 April 1921, against Ireland and his last match on 17 November 1928 against England.
