= Ewart Lewis =

Welsh Anglican priest (1914–1963)

Ewart Lewis was a clergyman of the Church in Wales (Whitland 1914 - Llanblethian 1963), rector of Llanblethian with Cowbridge (Glamorgan). In the 1950s he served as Secretary of the Liturgical Commission of the Church in Wales, notably publishing the 1958 Prayer Book revision in the Church in Wales. An Anglo-Catholic, he was also interested in the local history of Pembrokeshire and Glamorgan.

== Sources ==
- J.B. LOUDON: Ewart Owen Thomas Lewis (1914–1963), Morgannwg, vol. 7 (1963), p. 11-14

== Publications ==
- Prayer Book revision in the Church in Wales, Provincial Council for Education, 1958
- The Church in Wales, Silurian Books
- The Church in Wales, the Catholic Faith and the Future, 1948
- Till death do us part, 1961
