= Ewert Bengtsson =

Ewert Bengtsson (born May 26, 1948) is a Swedish computer scientist and professor emeritus of computerized image analysis at Uppsala University. His research has focused on biomedical image analysis, quantitative microscopy, computer-assisted diagnostics, and artificial intelligence in pathology. He was a founding director of the Centre for Image Analysis (CBA) at Uppsala University and was elected an IEEE Fellow in 2015 for his contributions to quantitative microscopy and biomedical image analysis.

== Early life and education ==
Bengtsson was born in Marmaverken, Söderhamn Municipality, Sweden. During 1966-67 he was exchange student at Ridgewood High School, NJ, USA obtaining a high school diploma and in 1968 he achived the student exam from Staffansskolan in Söderhamn. He studied engineering physics at Uppsala University, receiving an MSc in 1974. His master's thesis examined how to digitize light microscopy images for computer-assisted analysis of cell images. He subsequently completed a PhD in Physics at Uppsala University in 1977 under the main supervision of Kai Siegbahn and with Bengt Olsen and Björn Stenkvist as assistant supervisors. His doctoral dissertation focused on computer-aided analysis of microscopic images for the early detection of cervical cancer.

== Career ==
Bengtsson began his academic career at Uppsala University in 1973 as a research assistant working on computerized analysis of cervical smear images. He later became scientific director of the Image Analysis Laboratory and, in 1980, qualified as docent in scientific computing. In 1983 he held a postdoctoral appointment at the Electrotechnical Laboratory in Tsukuba, Japan.

In 1988 Bengtsson together with two colleagues founded the Centre for Image Analysis (CBA) as a joint research unit between Uppsala University, the Swedish University of Agricultural Sciences and the Swedish Environmental Protection Agency, serving as its director during several terms between 1988 and 2010. He was appointed Professor of Computerized Image Analysis at Uppsala University in 1996 and remained in that position until his retirement in 2015, after which he became Professor Emeritus.

In addition to his research, Bengtsson served as Dean of Mathematics and Computer Science at Uppsala University from 1996 to 1998 and as Vice Rector for Information Technology from 1998 to 2011. He also took the initiative of forming the Swedish Foundation for Strategic Research's VISIT research network, which promoted collaboration in image analysis and visualization.

Throughout his career, Bengtsson supervised 26 doctoral students as principal supervisor and nine as assistant supervisor. Many of his former students have continued careers in image analysis, computer vision, and biomedical engineering.

== Research ==
Bengtsson's research has focused on computerized image analysis and its biomedical applications, particularly quantitative microscopy, digital pathology, and computer-assisted diagnosis. His work has combined image processing, pattern recognition, and, more recently, artificial intelligence to develop automated methods for the analysis of medical images and microscopic specimens.

His early research concentrated on computer-assisted analysis of cervical cytology for cancer screening. Beginning in the 1970s, he developed automated microscopy systems capable of identifying abnormal cells in Pap smear samples, work that formed the basis of his doctoral dissertation and was later commercialized through IMTEC Image Technology AB. He subsequently, together with research partners in India, participated in the development of the CerviSCAN project, which sought to produce a lower-cost automated cervical cancer screening system suitable for resource-limited healthcare settings.

Beyond cervical cytology, Bengtsson's research has encompassed a broad range of medical imaging applications, including quantitative microscopy, digital imaging cytometry, histopathology, computed tomography (CT), magnetic resonance imaging (MRI), positron emission tomography (PET), and single-photon emission computed tomography (SPECT). His work has contributed to image segmentation, feature extraction, vascular analysis, three-dimensional visualization, and computer-assisted surgical planning.

From the 2000s onward, Bengtsson increasingly focused on artificial intelligence and machine learning for pathology. His research has included automated grading of prostate cancer using histopathological images and the development of outcome-based algorithms that predict disease aggressiveness directly from tissue samples.Following his retirement from Uppsala University, he continued this work through Spearpoint Analytics AB, where he co-developed the Prostate Cancer Aggressiveness Index (PCAI), an artificial intelligence system for prostate cancer prognosis.

Bengtsson has also contributed to research on quantitative microscopy and digital image analysis in other biomedical fields, including skeletal muscle biology, oral cancer, and nuclear medicine. In addition, he has participated in projects involving haptic visualization and image-guided planning for cranio-maxillofacial surgery. His research has been characterized by the integration of computational methods with clinical and biomedical applications, with an emphasis on improving the accuracy and reproducibility of medical image analysis.

== Voluntary services ==
In addition to his academic work Bengtsson has been very active in peace and human rights organizations where he has applied his technical skills to developing computer programs to take care of book keeping and other administrative chores starting in the early 1970s long before such systems were commercially available. He served as treasurer for SWEFOR, the Swedish section of IFOR the International Fellowship of Reconciliation, from 1971 until 2016. He has served as treasurer för Uppsala Missionskyrka since 2014.

== Entrepreneurship ==
Bengtsson has participated in several technology companies based on image analysis research. Between 1984 and 1989 he served as Head of Development at IMTEC Image Technology AB, where automated microscopy systems were developed for medical applications.

He later chaired Uppsala Bildbehandling AB, a consultancy company in image analysis, and contributed to the establishment of Computer Wound Analysis Institute AB and Diascan AB. In 2019 he co-founded Spearpoint Analytics AB, a company developing artificial intelligence systems for prostate cancer diagnosis.

== Publications and professional service ==
Bengtsson has authored more than 190 scientific publications in computerized image analysis, medical imaging, and artificial intelligence, with research widely cited in the scientific literature.

He has served on editorial boards for several journals, including Computer Methods and Programs in Biomedicine, Machine Graphics and Vision, and the Journal of Multimedia Information Systems. He has also served on funding and evaluation committees for the Swedish Research Council, the Swedish Foundation for Strategic Research, the European Research Council, and other national and international research organizations.

== Awards and honours ==
- Member of the Royal Society of Sciences at Uppsala (2000)
- Fellow of the Royal Swedish Academy of Engineering Sciences (2006)
- Gustaf Adolf Gold Medal, Uppsala University (2013)
- IEEE Fellow (2015)
