= Wendy Ewart =

British scientist

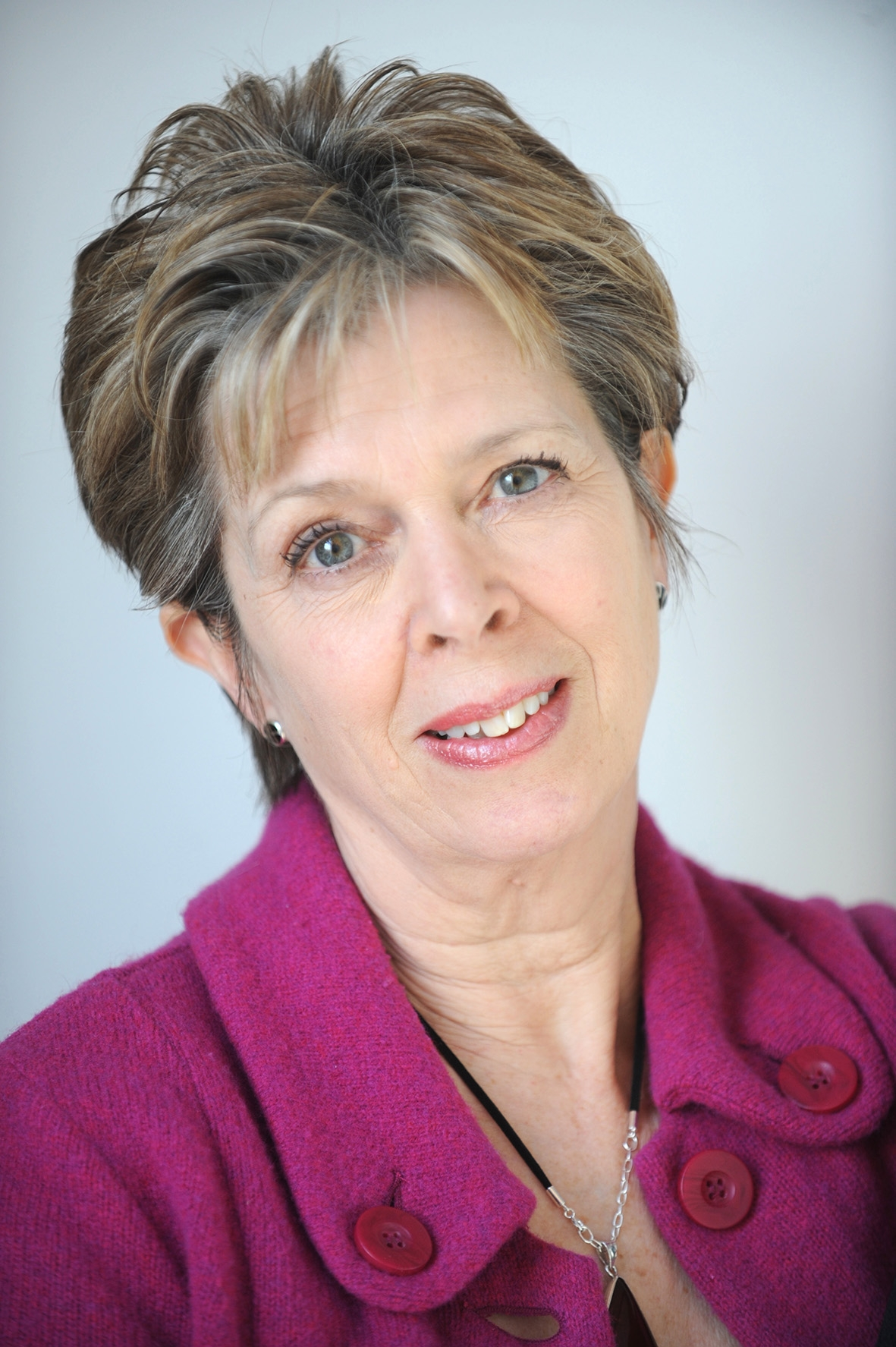
- Ewart in 2010
- Education: University of Southampton and the University of Bristol
- Known for: Deputy Chief Executive and Chief of Strategy, MRC; Director of both UK Biobank and the Francis Crick Institute
- Scientific career
- Workplaces: Medical Research Council

Wendy Ewart is a British scientist who worked for the Medical Research Council (MRC) from 2008 to 2014.

== Education ==
Ewart earned a BSc in physiology and biochemistry from the University of Southampton, and a PhD in neuroscience at the University of Bristol. She was later awarded an additional honorary doctorate from the University of Bristol after her retirement.

== Career ==
Before joining the MRC, Ewart worked at the Wellcome Trust (1991-2003) managing funding programmes, including those for the developing world. From 2003 to 2008 she was head of research strategy at the faculty of medicine, Imperial College.

Ewart was appointed as director of strategy for the MRC in 2008. In this position, Ewart was responsible for the development of the MRC's strategic plan "Research Changes Lives," which was introduced in June 2009.She was appointed as Deputy Chief Executive and Chief of Strategy in January 2012. In this capacity she was a director of both UK Biobank and the Francis Crick Institute.

Ewart retired as the Deputy Chief Executive and Chief of Strategy for the MRC in 2014. She was succeeded by Dr. Jim Smith. Upon her retirement, Professor Sir John Savill, the Chief Executive of the MRC said,

“Wendy Ewart has made an enormous contribution to the MRC, achieving so much in a short period of time, and she will be greatly missed. I give her my thanks for being an outstanding deputy and wish her well.”

== Awards and honours ==
- Fellow, Faculty of Medicine, Imperial College London, in recognition of outstanding achievements
- Member of the Order of the British Empire for services to medical research, 2015
- Honorary Doctorate, University of Bristol, 2016

== Select publications ==
- Ewart, Wendy R.; Winikoff, Beverly (24 July 1998). "Toward Safe and Effective Medical Abortion". Science. 281(5376): 520–521. doi:10.1126/science.281.5376.520. ISSN 0036-8075. PMID 9705721.
