= John Ewart (doctor) =

New Zealand doctor and hospital superintendent

- Born: 14 May 1858; Ecclefechan, Dumfriesshire, Scotland
- Died: 5 August 1939 (aged 81); Wellington, New Zealand
- Education: University of Edinburgh, MD, 1885
- Occupation: Surgeon
- Years active: 1885–1922

John Ewart (14 May 1858 – 5 August 1939) was a New Zealand doctor and medical superintendent of Wellington Hospital from 1889 to 1909.

Ewart was born in Ecclefechan, Dumfriesshire, Scotland on 14 May 1858. He attended the Annan Academy and then studied medicine at the University of Edinburgh gaining an MB and CM in 1880 and MD in 1885. He studied surgery under Joseph Lister the British surgeon who developed antiseptic surgery. Ewart worked in hospitals in England and Wales before emigrating in search of a better climate to New Zealand in 1887 on the ship Waimate.

From 1887 to 1889 he was surgeon at Timaru Hospital and was then appointed medical superintendent of Wellington Hospital. He held this post for 20 years though he remained honorary surgeon to the hospital from 1909 when he took up a private practice. He oversaw the expansion of the hospital and was known as an able administrator who also improved the standards of aseptic treatment and expanded training for nurses. The tuberculosis hospital, which opened in 1930 (later Ewart Hospital) was named after him.

Ewart retired in 1922, and died in Wellington on 5 August 1939.

== Family ==
Ewart's family emigrated from Scotland before him in 1885. Two of his brothers were doctors: David Ewart of Chichester, England and William Ewart of Wellington. He had four sisters one of whom, Jessie Ewart, was matron of Invercargill Hospital.

In 1889 Ewart married Grace Brandon and they had two daughters and one son, Ian Ewart, who was also a doctor.
