= Jock Ewart =

Scottish footballer (1891–1943)

Personal information
- Full name: John Ewart
- Date of birth: 14 February 1891
- Place of birth: Loanhead, Scotland
- Date of death: 22 June 1943 (aged 52)
- Place of death: Bellshill, Scotland
- Height: 5 ft 11 1/2 in (1.82 m)
- Position: Goalkeeper

Youth career
- 1906–1907: Douglas Park
- 1907: Bellshill Rovers
- 1907: Bellshill Athletic
- 1908–1909: Larkhall Thistle

Senior career*
Years	Team	Apps	(Gls)
1909–1912	Airdrieonians	84	(0)
1912–1923	Bradford City	255	(0)
1923–1927	Airdrieonians	122	(0)
1927–1928	Bradford City	28	(0)
1928–1931	Preston North End	35	(0)

International career
1910–1911	Scottish League XI	2	(0)
1921	Scotland	1	(0)
- * Club domestic league appearances and goals

John Ewart (14 February 1891 – 22 June 1943) was a Scottish footballer who made over 280 appearances in the Football League for Bradford City as a goalkeeper. He also played in the Scottish League for Airdrieonians in two spells and won one cap for Scotland at international level. The SFA described him as "a goalkeeper who helped to perpetuate the myth of eccentricity required for the position".

== Career ==
A goalkeeper, Ewart was born in Midlothian and raised in Bellshill; he began his career with a number of junior clubs in Lanarkshire, before joining Scottish League First Division club Airdrieonians in March 1909. He moved to England to join First Division club Bradford City in May 1912 for £1,200, a then-record fee for a goalkeeper. Either side of the First World War, Ewart made 302 appearances for the club, before returning Airdrieonians for a £300 fee in July 1923. In May 1927, Ewart returned to Bradford City, newly-relegated to the Third Division North, for a second spell, but lasted one season before seeing out his career with Second Division club Preston North End and retiring in 1931. Shortly after his retirement, Ewart was suspended from football sine die by the FA for an alleged match fixing incident.

At representative level, Ewart made two appearances for the Scottish League XI in 1910 and 1911. He won a single full cap for Scotland in a 3–0 1920–21 British Home Championship win over England on 9 April 1921. After retiring from football, Ewart returned to the game as a trainer.

== Personal life ==
Ewart spoke French and German and was a skilled flute, piccolo and violin player. He served as a private during the First World War, firstly in the West Yorkshire Regiment and latterly in the Training Reserve, and was seriously wounded in action. Ewart was a publican later in life.
