= Russian submarine Forel =

1902 midget submarine

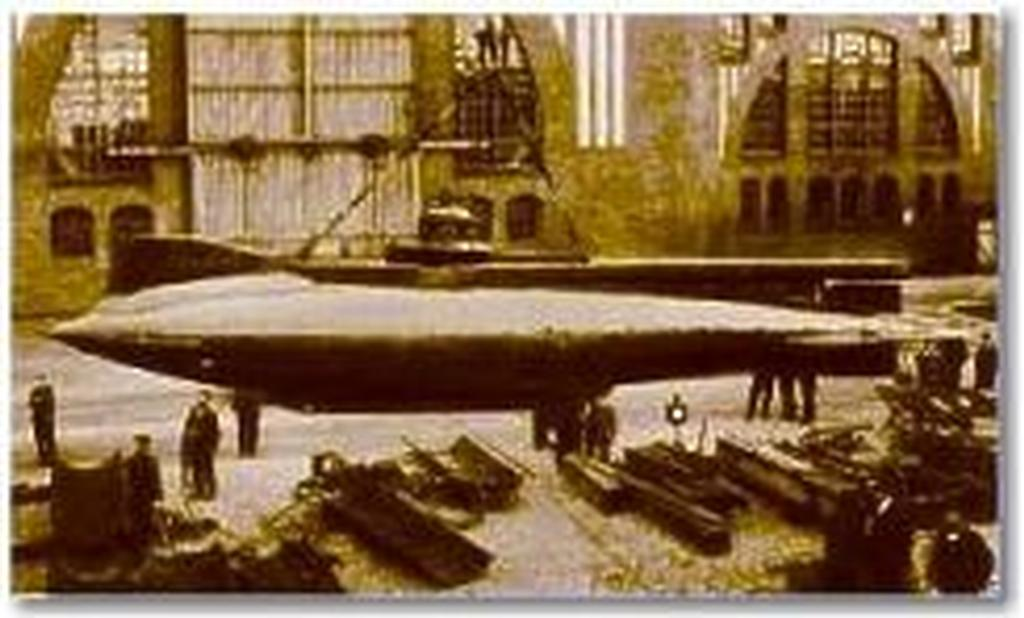

History

Russian Empire
- Name: Forel
- Builder: Friedrich Krupp Germaniawerft, Kiel, Germany
- Launched: 8 June 1903
- Acquired: 24 May 1904
- Commissioned: 21 August 1904
- Decommissioned: 31 May 1910
- Fate: Sunk 17 May 1910

General characteristics
- Displacement: 15.5 tons surfaced; 16.5 tons submerged
- Length: 13.0 m (42 ft 8 in)
- Beam: 1.66 m (5 ft 5 in)
- Propulsion: 1 electric motor, 1 shaft, 65 shp (48 kW)
- Speed: 5.5 knots (10.2 km/h; 6.3 mph)
- Range: 6 nm (2.4×10^{−7} in) at 4.5 knots (8.3 km/h; 5.2 mph)
- Test depth: 30 m (98 ft)
- Complement: 4
- Armament: 2 x 18 in (457 mm) external torpedo tubes (bow)

Forel (Russian: Форель, German: Forelle - Trout) was a midget submarine designed by Raimundo Lorenzo de Equevilley Montjustín and built by Krupp in Kiel, Germany. The design was an experimental design built as a private venture by Krupp in hopes of attracting a contract from the Imperial German Navy. Although the design proved moderately successful, the submarine did not attract German naval attention. She was purchased by the Imperial Russian Navy (IRN) in 1904 and served with the IRN until she was lost in a diving accident in 1910. She had the distinction of being the first submarine to have been built in Germany, preceding SM U-1. Forel was succeeded in service by the Krab class (one ship).

== Design ==
Forelle was a single-hull boat designed with internal ballast and compensating tanks. She had fixed angled aft planes, and movable forward units for dive control. This boat had to be carried into action on board a surface ship and launched close to its target, as she was not fitted with a separate surface propulsion system. She was equipped with two external Whitehead torpedoes.

Forelle had an overall length of 13.00 m (42 ft 8 in) The boats' beam was 1.66 m (5 ft 5 in) without torpedoes and 2.82 m (9 ft 3 in) with the external torpedoes. The boat displaced 15.5 tonnes (15.3 long tons) when surfaced and 16.5 t (16.2 long tons) when submerged.

She was fitted with one electric motor producing 65 metric horsepower (48 kW; 64 bhp) for surface and submerged propulsion. This engine gave the boat a top surface speed of 6.55 knots (12.13 km/h; 7.54 mph), and 6.50 knots (12.04 km/h; 7.48 mph) when submerged. Without torpedoes, top speed increased to 7.55 knots (13.98 km/h; 8.69 mph) on the surface and 7.73 knots (14.32 km/h; 8.90 mph) submerged. Maximum range was 3.5 nautical miles (6.5 km; 4.0 mi) at 4.5 knots (8.3 km/h; 5.2 mph) with torpedoes and 6 nautical miles (11 km; 6.9 mi) at 4.5 knots (8.3 km/h; 5.2 mph) without torpedoes. Power for the electrical engine was provided by 180-cells Lead–acid battery which used peat fibres to isolate the positive and negative plate, and absorbed the acid, allowing the battery to be used in any inclined position without the acid overflowing.

== Operational history ==
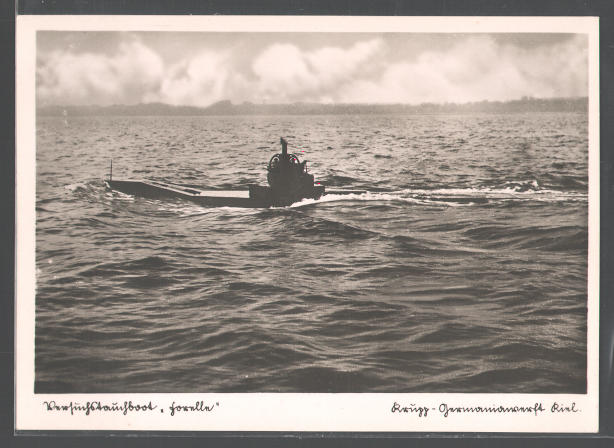
The Forelle at sea

Forelle made her first trials on 24 June 1903 in Eckernförde and Kiel. She underwent a few modifications which rose her displacement first to 17.5 t (17.2 long tons) and then finally 19 t (19 long tons). The Imperial Russian Navy purchased the submarine in May 1904 for service in the Russo-Japanese War. It was shipped from Kiel to Liepāja by railway, together with a team of German engineers to train the Russian crew, and was commissioned at Kronstadt on 21 August 1904. It was then sent via the Trans-Siberian Railway to Vladivostok, arriving on 29 September, and joined the Siberian Flotilla on 2 October, becoming the first Russian submarine in the Pacific. The submarine did not see combat during the Russo-Japanese War, but the Russians believed its mere presence deterred the Japanese from attacking Vladivostok.

Forel continued to operate out of Vladivostok after the war; however, by 1908 it was considered obsolete and was re-classed as a training vessel. The submarine sank in an accident on 17 May 1910. The crew managed to escape, and the ship was salvaged from a depth of 26 metres (85 ft). Vice Admiral Ivan Grigorovich authorized it to be returned to Liepāja for repairs, but shipping was never implemented.
