= John Alexander Ewart =

British Army general (1821–1904)

General Sir John Alexander Ewart GCB (1 June 1821 – 18 June 1904) was a 19th-century British military leader who commanded the Gordon Highlanders and several other important British regiments. A hero of the Siege of Lucknow he spent the second half of his life without his left arm. A favourite of Queen Victoria, he served as her official aide-de-camp.

== Life ==
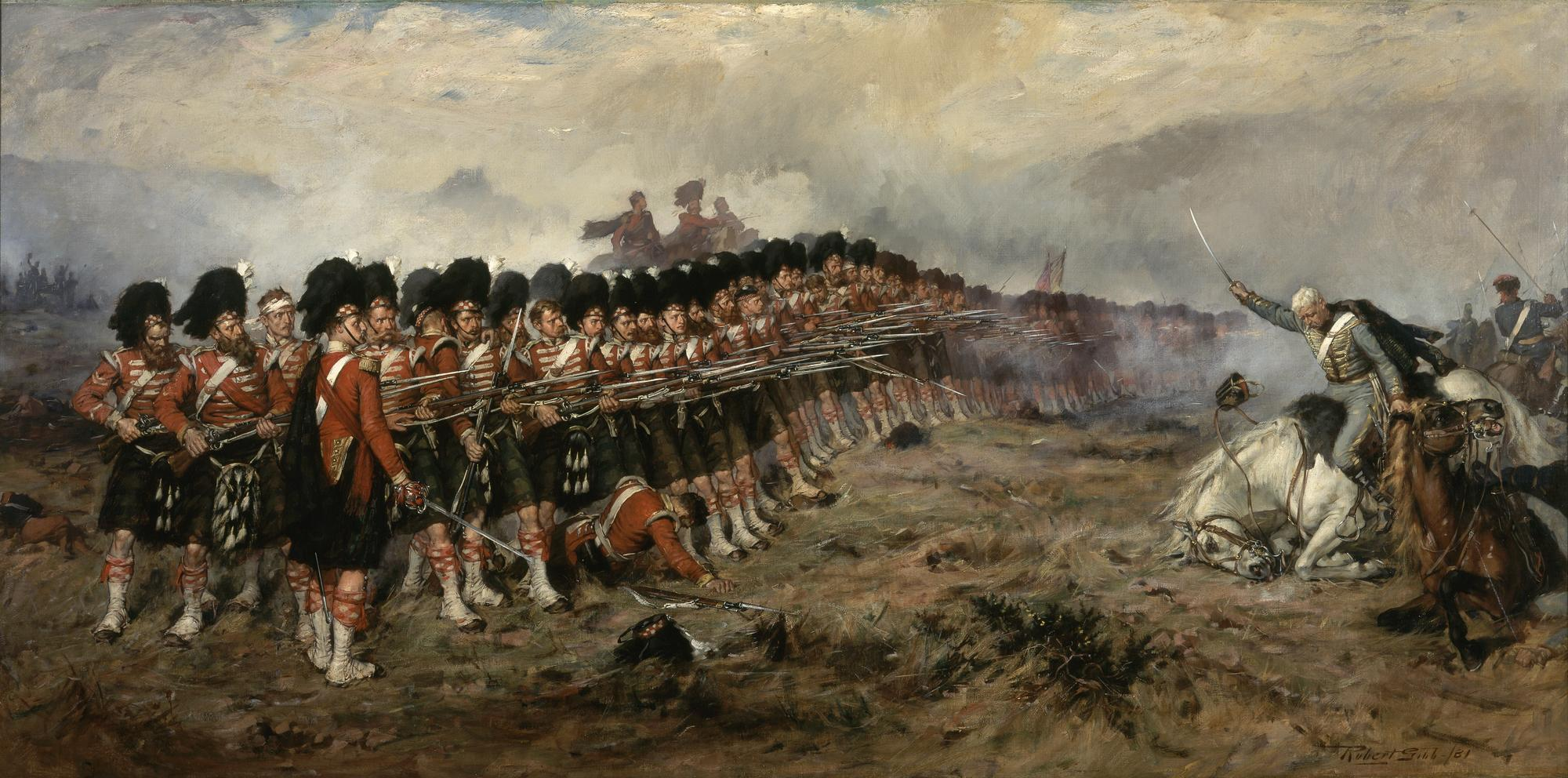
The Thin Red Line by Robert Gibb, depicting the 93rd Sutherland Highlanders during the Battle of Balaclava in October 1854.

=== Early life and career ===
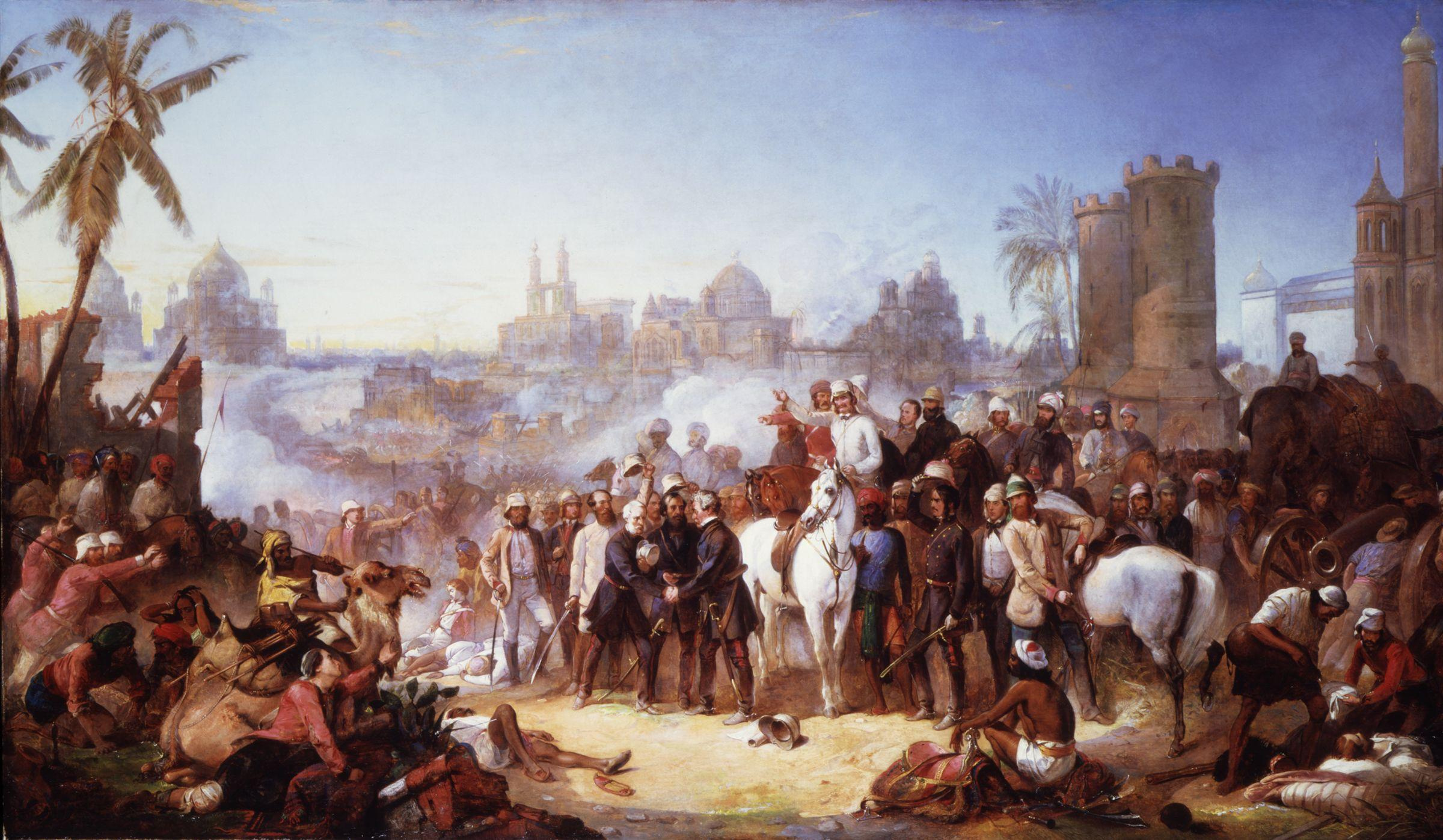
The Siege of Lucknow where Ewart was recommended for the Victoria Cross.

Ewart was born in Sholapur in India on 1 June 1821 the third son of Lt General John Frederick Ewart CB of the Indian Army (son of Joseph Ewart), and his wife, Lavinia Brisbane, daughter of Sir Charles Brisbane. His younger brother was Charles Brisbane Ewart.

He was educated at the Royal Military College, Sandhurst and trained as a military leader in the footsteps of his father and grandfathers. He joined the British Army in July 1838 as an ensign in the 35th Royal Sussex Regiment. He was promoted to lieutenant in April 1842 and served in both Cape Town and Mauritius. In 1846 he transferred to the 93rd Sutherland Highlanders. He was promoted to captain in 1848.

=== Crimean War ===
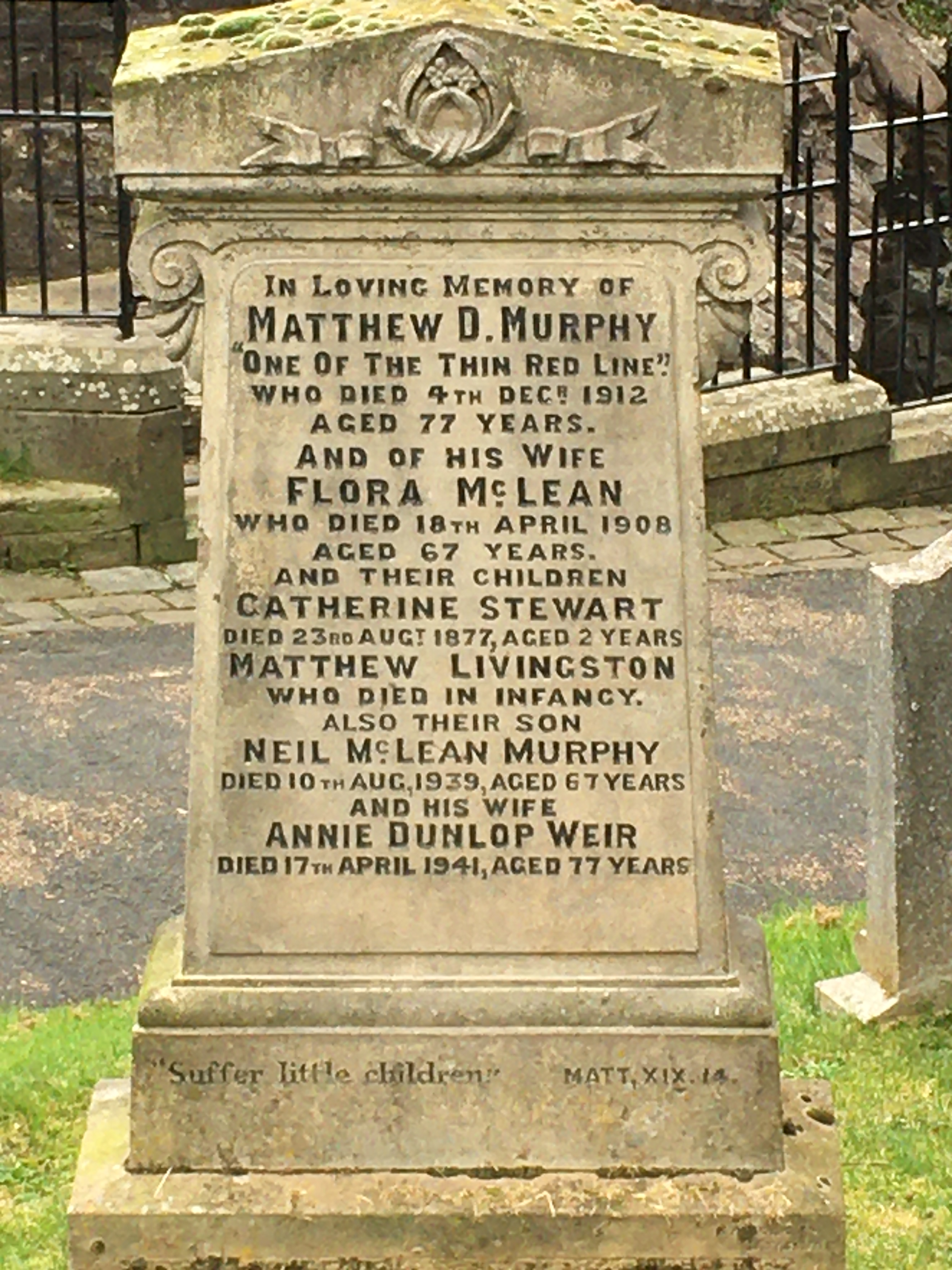
Mathew Murphy of The Thin Red Line

In April 1854 he was sent to Gallipoli to lead his troops in the Crimean War, reaching Varna in June. He was quickly promoted to brevet major in May 1854. He saw action at the Battle of Alma (20 September 1854) and the Battle of Balaklava (25 September 1854 onwards). During the latter he was one of the officers involved in the infamous action later depicted in the painting, "The Thin Red Line" on 25 October, being in charge of the 6th Company of the regiment. His actions here saw his promotion to full major in December 1854.

On 6 November he was the first to inform Lord Raglan of the Russian advance at Inkerman. He was also with Raglan at the dramatic death of General Strangways, killed by a shell (which also killed two horses beneath their riders). In May 1855 he led his command to the Sea of Azov and aided in the capture of the town of Kertch and adjacent fortress at Yenikale. He then returned to join the Siege of Sebastopol, participating in the assaults on both 18 June and 5 September.

After the war he was promoted to brevet lieutenant colonel and was one of only four officers to receive the French Legion of Honour and the Turkish Order of Medjidie, and one of only three to receive the Piedmontese Silver Medal, the latter recognising service without one day of absence during the entire war. He returned to England in July 1856 and was based at both Aldershot and Dover.

=== Indian Mutiny ===
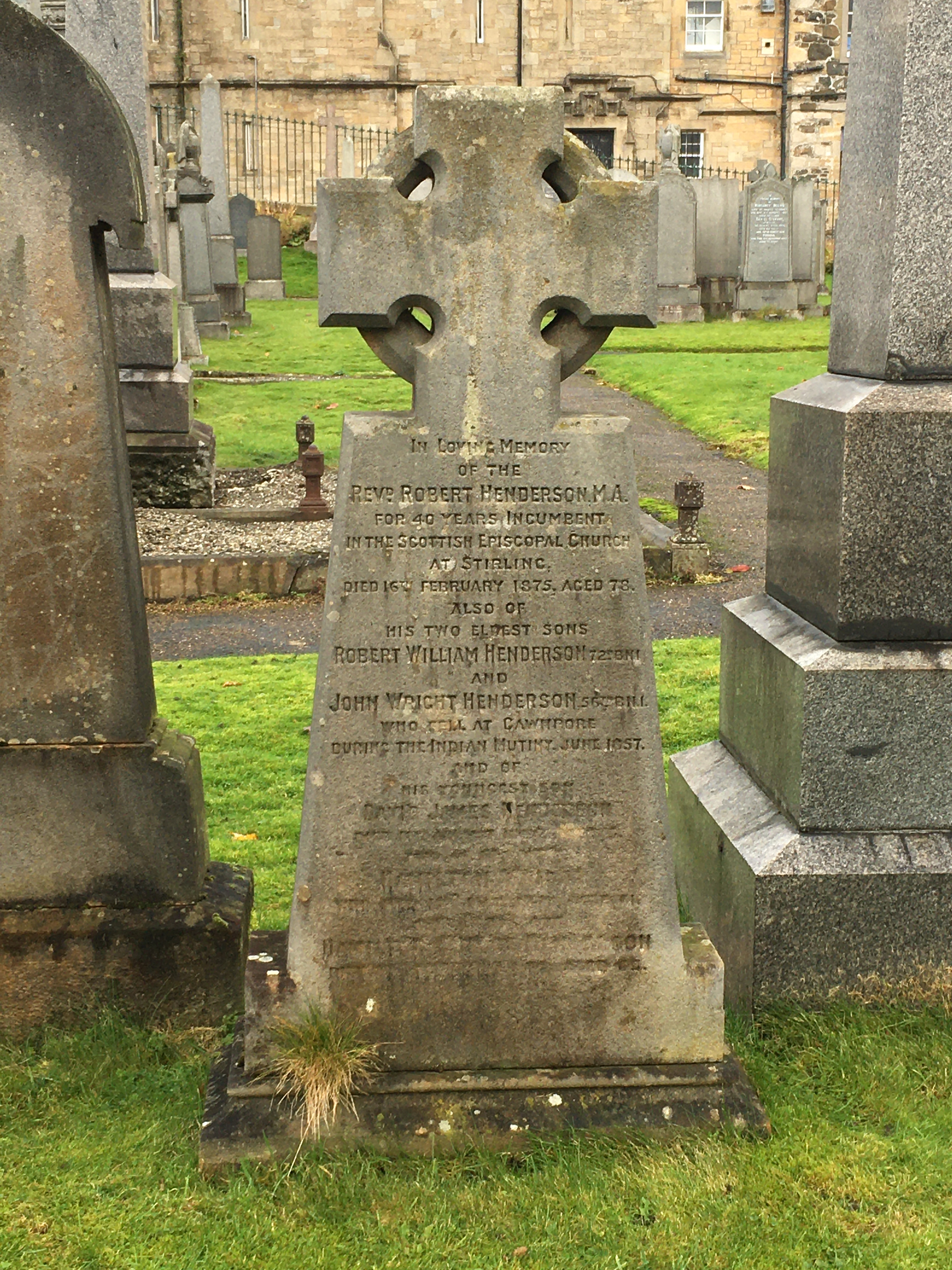
The Henderson Brother Memorial in Stirling.

In June 1857 he sailed with his troops heading to China to take part in the Second Opium War. However, at the Cape of Good Hope they received alternative orders and were instead dispatched to help to deal with the Indian Mutiny which had begun some months earlier but remained unresolved. The regiment were sent to Cawnpore and from there were dispatched to relieve the many trapped in the Siege of Lucknow including the original rescue party of the 78th Highlanders.

On 2 November 1857 he captured the fortified village of Bunterah and on 5 December took supplies and ammunition to the town of Alumbagh relieving Sir Henry Havelock. On 13 November he captured the fort at Jalalabad. On 14 November he was joined by Sir Colin Campbell and 4000 further troops. Together they captured the forts of Dilkusha and Martiniere.

On 16 November, alongside Lt Colonel Leith-Hay, they successfully captured Secunderabad. During this battle he had his bonnet shot off at distressingly short range and also received two sword wounds, one of which put his right arm in a sling. When they successfully infiltrated the fortress they killed all the defenders, leaving some 2000 dead. The following day they captured the Shah Nujjeef retiring to Martiniere on 22nd. On 27 November, with 3000 men, he escorted the evacuation of a large number of civilians in their crossing of the River Ganges. He then returned to aid General Wyndham at Cawnpore. In the evacuation beginning on 29 November, many persons were successfully got over the bridge on the Ganges, but on the third day, 1 December 1857, Ewart lost his left arm to cannon fire. His right arm at this time was still in a sling. The loss of the arm brought him close to death. Once sufficiently recovered in Cawnpore, he sailed to England for full recuperation.

On the death of Lt Colonel Adrian Hope at Fort Rohya Ewart officially became lieutenant colonel in his place.

In April 1859 Queen Victoria created him a Companion of the Bath and made him her personal aide-de-camp.

He oversaw the Ross-shire Buffs until 1864 at the rank of full colonel and in 1872 became a major general.

He was recommended for a Victoria Cross after the Relief of Lucknow but a decision was made to award only one VC to the three potential candidates. Ewart lost by one vote to Captain W. G. D. Stewart, the third candidate being Captain W. A. Cooper.

=== Later life and career ===
In March 1877 he became commander of the Indian region of Allahabad. In November 1879 he was promoted further to lieutenant general and returned to Britain. In January 1884 he became a full general and placed in charge of the Wiltshire Regiment. in March 1884 he was placed in charge of the 92nd Gordon Highlanders. In June 1895 he took over as colonel of the Argyll and Sutherland Highlanders.

At Queen Victoria's Diamond Jubilee in 1897 she raised him to Knight Commander of the Bath (KCB).

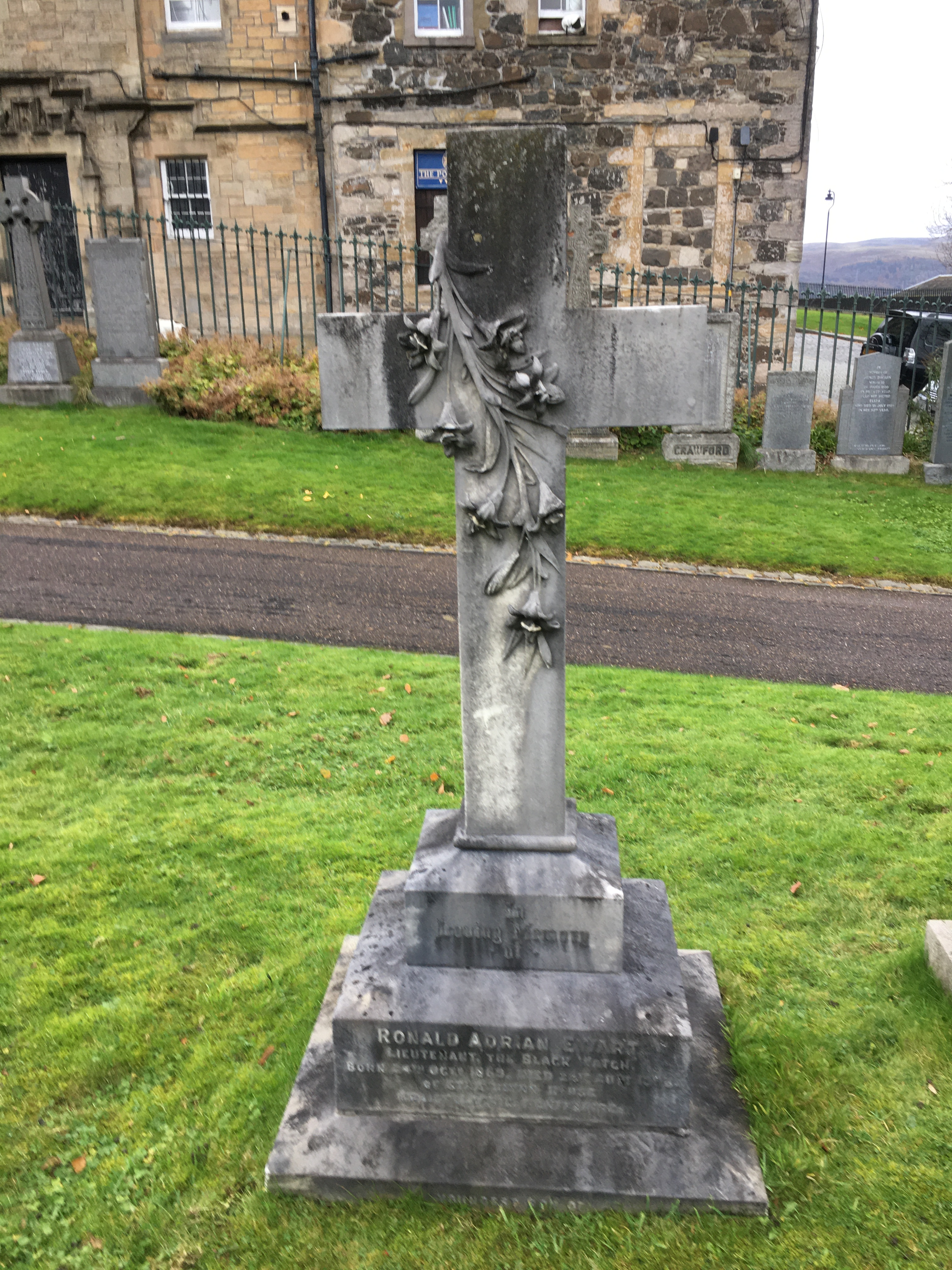
General Ewart's Grave.

He died peacefully at home in Dumfriesshire on 18 June 1904 a few days after his 83rd birthday. He is buried in the Old Town Cemetery at Stirling Castle in central Scotland.

== Family ==
In 1858 he married Frances Stone, daughter of John Spencer Stone of Callingwood Hall.

Their family home (which he rarely saw) was Craigclough Hall in Eskdale near Langholm.

They had two sons who came to fame in their own right: Lieutenant-general Sir Spencer Ewart aide-de-camp to King George V and Admiral Arthur Ewart.

== Memorials ==
A memorial to Ewart, designed by Robert Lorimer, was erected in St Giles Cathedral in Edinburgh in 1905.

== Memorabilia ==
His sword and scabbard from the Battle of Alma is held in the National Army Museum in London.

== Publications ==
- A Few Remarks about the British Army
- The Story of a Soldier's Life (1881)
