= Charles Brisbane Ewart =

British Army officer and Lieutenant Governor of Jersey (1827–1903)

Lieutenant-General Charles Brisbane Ewart CB
- Born: 15 May 1827; Coventry, West Midlands
- Died: 8 August 1903 (aged 76); Folkestone, Kent
- Burial place: Folkestone, Kent
- Military career
- Allegiance: United Kingdom
- Branch: British Army
- Service years: 1845–1894
- Rank: Lieutenant-General
- Conflicts: Crimean War; Sudan Expedition
- Awards: Companion of the Order of the Bath

Lieutenant-General Charles Brisbane Ewart CB (15 May 1827 – 8 August 1903) was a British Army officer who became Lieutenant Governor of Jersey.

== Life ==
He was the son of Lt General John Frederick Ewart and his wife, Lavinia Brisbane, daughter of the military hero, Charles Brisbane. His brother was General Sir John Alexander Ewart.

Ewart was commissioned into the Royal Engineers in 1845. He fought at the Battles of Alma, Balaclava and Inkerman as well as the Siege of Sevastopol during the Crimean War.

He was appointed Deputy Director of Works for Barracks in 1872 and a Member of the Ordnance Committee in 1884. He took part in the Sudan Expedition in 1885 and became Lieutenant Governor of Jersey in 1887 before retiring in 1894.

Ewart was appointed Colonel commandant of the Royal Engineers on 30 March 1902, succeeding General Sir Andrew Clarke.

== Family ==
In 1860 he married his second cousin, Emily Jane Ewart; they had three sons and two daughters.

Government offices
Preceded by Henry Wray	Lieutenant Governor of Jersey; 1887–1892	Succeeded by Sir Edward Markham
Military offices
Preceded by Sir Andrew Clarke	Colonel Commandant, Royal Engineers; 1902–1903	Succeeded by
