= List of governors of Portsmouth =

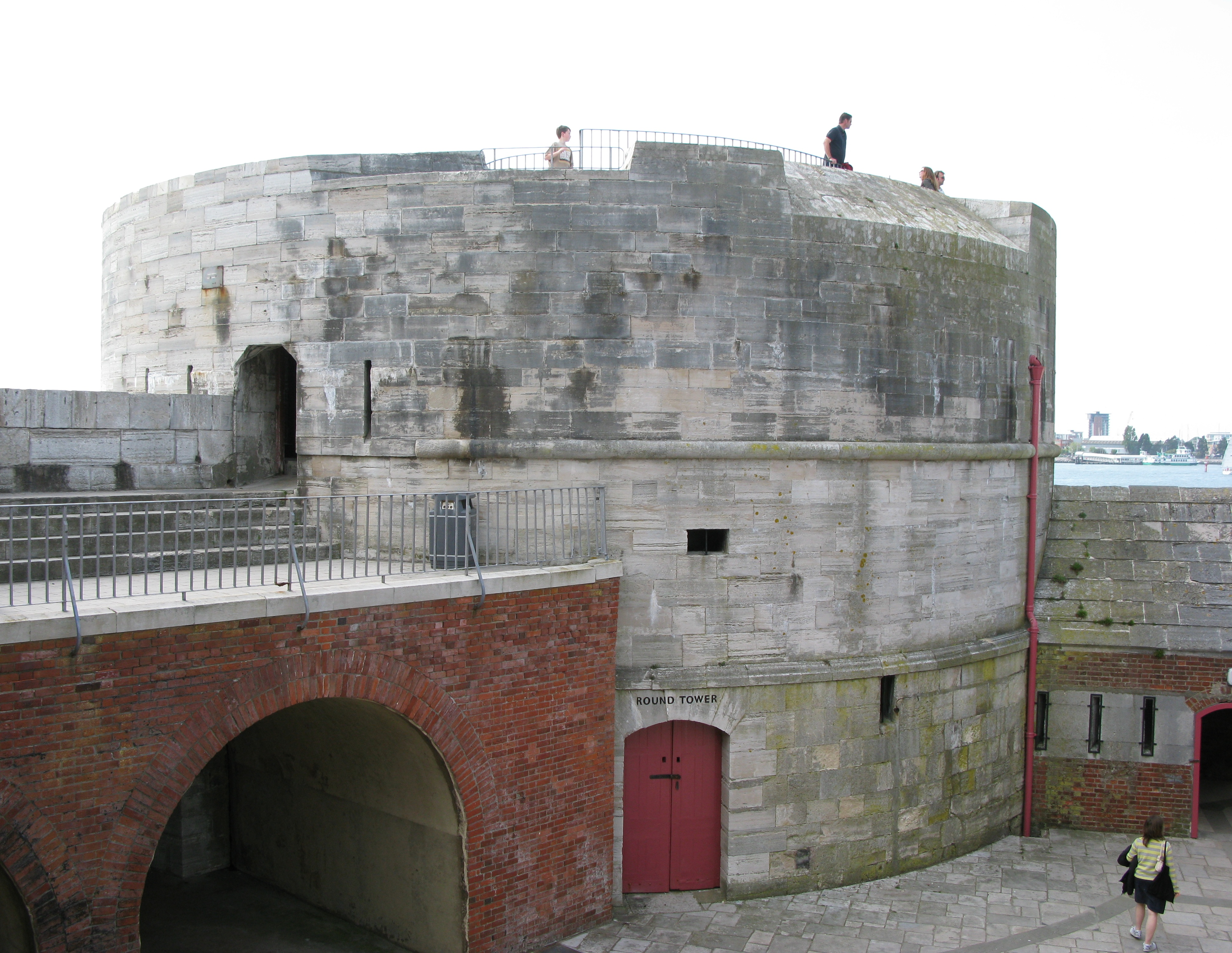
The Round Tower, Portsmouth

The Governor of Portsmouth was the Constable of Portchester Castle from the 13th Century to the reign of Henry VIII. Since then Portsmouth had its own military Captain or Governor, who was based in the Square Tower built in Old Portsmouth in 1494 as part of the fortifications to protect the rapidly expanding naval port. The Coats of Arms of former Governors of Portsmouth are displayed on the walls of the Square Tower's Lower Hall. In 1540, the Hospital of St. Nicholas, suitably converted and modernised, became the military centre of the town. Its Domus Dei, now the roofless Royal Garrison Church, became the residence of the Captain or Governor. The Governorship was abolished in 1834.

The Lieutenant Governorship was vested in the General Officer Commanding South-West District from 1793 to 1865, in the General Officer Commanding Southern District from 1865 to 1903 and in the Officer Commanding Portsmouth Defences / Portsmouth Garrison from 1903 until that post was abolished in 1968.

== Constables of the King's Castle at Portchester and Town of Portsmouth ==
- 1289–1290: Henry Hussey
- 1316: Eustace de Haeche
- 1327: John de Basing
- 1335–1337: Richard FitzAlan, 10th Earl of Arundel
- 1338: John Hacket
- 1339–1342: Richard FitzAlan, 11th Earl of Arundel
- 1347: Eustace de Hocke
- 1361–1367: John de Edyndon
- 1369–1376: Richard FitzAlan, 11th Earl of Arundel
- 1376–1381: Sir Robert Ashton
- 1441: Sir John Cherowin
- 1451–1453: John Talbot, 1st Earl of Shrewsbury
- 1454: Richard Neville, 5th Earl of Salisbury
- 1461: John Tiptoft, 1st Earl of Worcester
- 1468: William Fiennes, 2nd Baron Saye and Sele
- 1473: Anthony Widvile
- 1483: Sir William Uvedale
- 1483–1484: William Mirfield
- 1509: William Cope
- 1511: Stephen Cope
- 1513: Thomas Fitzalan, 10th Earl of Arundel

== Governors of Portsmouth ==
- 1538–1540: Sir Thomas Spert (Captain of Portsmouth)
- 1544–1545: Sir Anthony Knyvett (1507–1554)
- 1545: John Chaderton (Captain of Portsmouth)
- 1545: William Paulet, 1st Marquess of Winchester
- 1551/2–1554: Richard Wingfield
- 1554–1559: Lord Chidiock Paulet (Captain)
- 1559–1571: Sir Adrian Poynings
- 1571–1593: Henry Radclyffe, 4th Earl of Sussex (Warden and Captain)
- 1593/4–1606: Charles Blount, 8th Baron Mountjoy
- 1606–1609: Sir Francis Vere
- 1609–1630: William Herbert, 3rd Earl of Pembroke
- 1630–1638: Edward Cecil, 1st Viscount Wimbledon
- 1638/9–1642: George Goring, 1st Baron Goring
- 1642–1643: Sir William Lewis, 1st Baronet (Parliamentary)
- 1644: William Jephson
- 1645: Richard Norton
- 1648: Robert Legg
- 1648: George Goring, 1st Baron Goring
- 1649: John Feilder
- 1649: John Desborough
- 1649–1659: Nathaniel Whetham
- 1660–1661: Richard Norton
- 1661–1673: Prince James, Duke of York
- 1673–1682: George Legge, 1st Baron Dartmouth
- 1682–1687: Edward Noel, 1st Earl of Gainsborough
- 1687–1689: James FitzJames, 1st Duke of Berwick
  - November 1688: Vice Henry Jermyn, 1st Baron Dover
- 1690–1694: Thomas Tollemache
- 1694–1712: Thomas Erle
- 1712–1714: William North, 6th Baron North and Grey
- 1714–1718: Thomas Erle
- 1718–1719: Charles Wills
- 1719–1730: George MacCartney
- 1730–1737: John Campbell, 2nd Duke of Argyll
- 1737–1740: Richard Boyle, 2nd Viscount Shannon
- 1740–1752: Philip Honywood
- 1752–1759: Henry Hawley
- 1759–1773: James O'Hara, 2nd Baron Tyrawley
- 1773–1778: Edward Harvey
- 1778–1782: Robert Monckton
- 1782–1794: Henry Herbert, 10th Earl of Pembroke
- 1794–1810: Sir William Pitt
- 1810–1811: Henry Fox
- 1811–1826: William Harcourt, 3rd Earl Harcourt
- 1826–1827: Sir William Keppel
- 3 November 1827 – 1834: Prince William Frederick, Duke of Gloucester and Edinburgh

== Lieutenant-Governors of Portsmouth ==
- 1514: Sir Thomas Wyndham
- 1558–1559?: Edward Turnour
- 1593/4?–1605: Sir Benjamin Berry
- 1615: Sir John Burlace
- 1620–1624: Sir John Oglander
- 1624: Sir Richard Morrison
- 1630?: Sir Thomas Brett
- 1640–1: Robert Willis
- 1647–?: Colonel Thomas Betsworth (or Bettesworth or Bettisworth)
- 1656: Major Peter Murford
- 1662: Sir William Berkeley
- 1665: Sir Phillip Honywood
- 1672: George Legge
- 1673: Henry Slingsby
- 1689: Colonel Rearsby
- 1689: Colonel Sir John Gibson
- 1697: Robert Fregue
- 1701: Colonel Sir John Gibson
- 1717: Colonel Peter Hawker
- 1731: General Peter Campbell
- 1751: John Leighton
- 15 February 1752: Captain John Murray
- 27 March 1775: Colonel Robert Watson
- 18 September 1790: Colonel Thomas Trigge
- 16 January 1796: Lieutenant-General Cornelius Cuyler
- 21 February 1799: Major-General Thomas Murray
- 25 June 1799: Major-General John Whitelocke
- 10 November 1804: Colonel Hildebrand Oakes
- 22 June 1805: Major-General John Hope
- 24 December 1805: Major-General Sir George Prevost
- 26 January 1808: Major-General Arthur Whetham
- 20 May 1813: Lieutenant-General Thomas Maitland
- 27 January 1814: Major-General William Houston
- 25 September 1814: Major-General Kenneth Howard
- 21 August 1819: Major-General Sir James Kempt
- 20 October 1819: Major-General Sir George Cooke
- 23 July 1821: Major-General Sir James Lyon
- 20 March 1828: Major-General Sir Colin Campbell
- 1834: Major-General Sir Thomas McMahon, 2nd Baronet
- 1839: Lieutenant-General Sir Hercules Pakenham
- 1846: Lieutenant-General Lord Frederick FitzClarence
- 1851: Major-General Sir George D'Aguilar
- 1852: Major-General Sir James Simpson
- 1855: Major-General Henry William Breton
- 1857: Lieutenant-General Sir James Scarlett
- 1860: Major-General Lord William Paulet
- 1865: Lieutenant-General Sir George Buller
- 1870: General George Upton, 3rd Viscount Templetown
- 1874: General Sir Charles Hastings Doyle
- 1877: General Sir John Garvock
- 1878: General Prince Edward of Saxe-Weimar-Eisenach
- 1884: General Sir George Willis
- 1889: General Sir Leicester Smyth
- 1890: Lieutenant-General Prince Arthur, Duke of Connaught and Strathearn
- 1893: Major General Sir John Davis
- 1898: Lieutenant General Sir Baker Russell

== Town Majors of Portsmouth ==
- 16 October 1753: Patrick Douglas
- 1781: Thomas Smelt
- to 1806: Grant
- 18 October 1806: Nathan Ashurst
- 12 January 1821: Robert Simpson
- 2 October 1823: Henry White
- in 1849, 1854: Frederick Thomas Maitland

== Sources ==
- Tim Backhouse. "The Governors & Lieutenant Governors of Portsmouth". Archived from the original on 22 May 2010.
- Robert Walcott, English Politics in the Early Eighteenth Century (Oxford: Oxford University Press, 1956)
