= William Keppel =

William Keppel may refer to:

- Willem van Keppel, 2nd Earl of Albemarle (1702–1754)
- William Keppel (British Army officer, born 1727) (1727–1787), British general, son of the 2nd Earl of Albemarle
- William Keppel (British Army officer, died 1834), British general and colonial administrator
- William Keppel, 4th Earl of Albemarle (1772–1849)
- William Keppel, 7th Earl of Albemarle (1832–1894)
