= Sir Nevil Macready, 3rd Baronet =

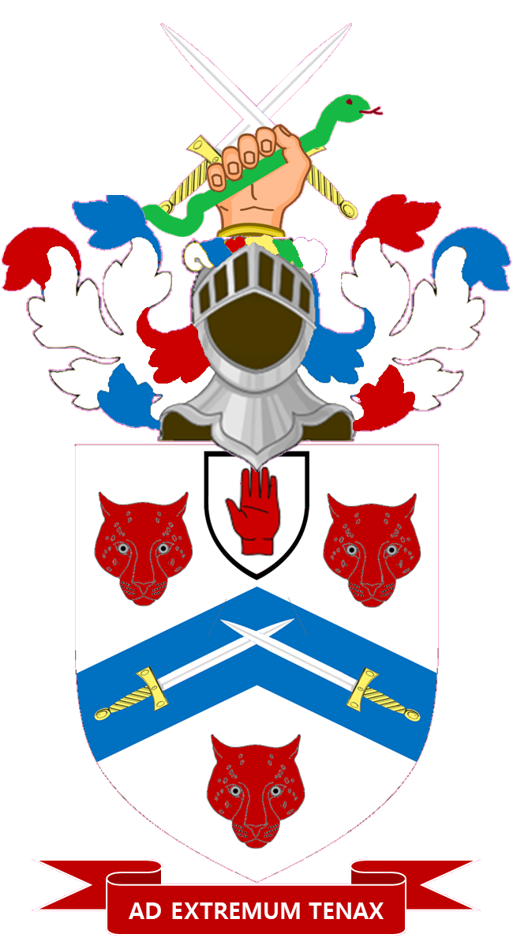
Achievement of arms

Sir Nevil John Wilfrid Macready, 3rd Baronet, CBE (7 September 1921 – 27 September 2014) was a British Army officer, businessman and public servant.

== Life ==
Sir Nevil was born on 7 September 1921, the son of 2nd baronet. He was educated at Cheltenham College and St John's College, Oxford, from where he graduated MA in 1947.

During World War II, Sir Nevil served with the Royal Artillery, was mentioned in staff despatches, and promoted to staff captain in 1945. He joined the BBC European Service in 1947 for three years.

Then he joined the oil industry. He was named Managing Director at Mobil Oil, 1975–1985. He was President of the Royal Warrant Holders Association, 1979–1980, and Institute of Petroleum.

Appointed CBE in 1983, he became Chairman of the British Horseracing Advisory Council from 1984–1995. From 1993, he was Deputy Chairman of the British Horseracing Board. A Trustee of Victoria and Albert Museum. He served as Chairman of the Mental Health Foundation.

== Family ==
Sir Nevil married Mary, only daughter of Sir Donald Balfour Fergusson, GCB, of Manor Farm, Ebbesbourne Wake, Wiltshire, on 16 September 1949. His family lived at the White House, Odiham, Hampshire, RG29 1LG. They had four children:

- Charles Macready. In 1981, he married Lorraine, daughter of Brian McAdam, of Connah's Quay, Deeside, Clwyd. He has succeeded to the title as 4th baronet.
- Caroline Macready.
- Sarah Macready.
- Anna Macready.

Sir Nevil died at home in Cheltenham on 27 September 2014, aged ninety-three. There was a funeral held on 10 October 2014, at Holy Trinity church, Crookham Village, Hampshire.

== Arms ==
Coat of arms of Sir Nevil Macready, 3rd Baronet

Crest
On a wreath of the colours in front of two swords points upwards in saltire proper pommels and hilts Or a cubit arm also Proper grasping a snake Vert.
Escutcheon
Argent on a chevron Azure between three leopard faces Gules two swords the points in saltire Proper pommels and hilts Or.
Motto
Ad Extremum Tenax

Baronetage of the United Kingdom
Preceded by Gordon Macready	Baronet (of Cheltenham); 1956–2014	Succeeded by Charles Macready
