= Frederick Shaw (British Army officer) =

British Army general (1861–1942)

Lieutenant-General The Right Honourable Sir Frederick Shaw KCB
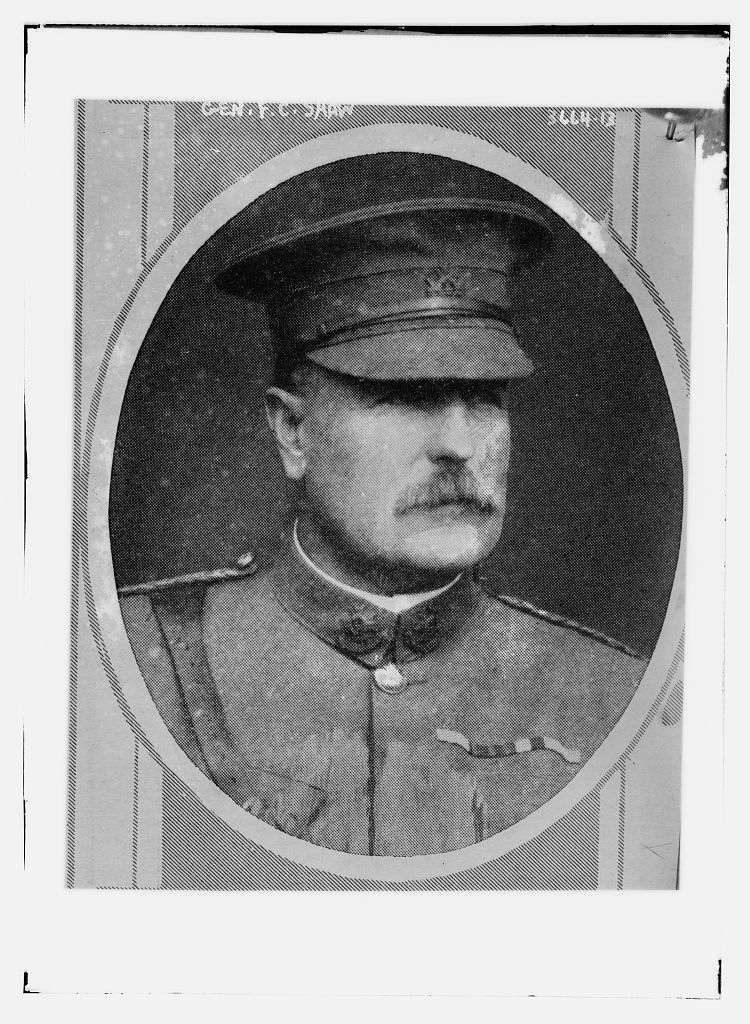
- Born: 31 July 1861
- Died: 6 January 1942 (aged 80)
- Military career
- Allegiance: United Kingdom
- Branch: British Army
- Service years: 1882–1920
- Rank: Lieutenant-General
- Unit: Sherwood Foresters
- Commands: 2nd Battalion Sherwood Foresters; 9th Brigade; 29th Division; 13th (Western) Division; Ireland
- Conflicts: Anglo-Egyptian War; Second Boer War; First World War; Anglo-Irish War
- Awards: Knight Commander of the Order of the Bath; Order of the White Eagle, 2nd Class (Serbia)

Lieutenant-General Sir Frederick Charles Shaw KCB PC (Ire) ( 31 July 1861 – 6 January 1942) was a British Army general who served in the Boer War and the First World War. He became Commander-in-Chief, Ireland, and retired in 1920.

== Family ==
Frederick Charles Shaw was born on 31 July 1861, the son of John Shaw of Normanton, Derbyshire. He was educated at Repton School. He married Florence Edith Denton, daughter of Reverend Canon Denton of Ashby-de-la-Zouch. She died in 1918; they had one daughter.

== Early military career ==
Shaw was commissioned as a second lieutenant into a Militia unit, the 2nd West York, on 24 December 1879.

After just over two years with this unit, he transferred over into the Sherwood Foresters, and the Regular Army, as a lieutenant on 28 January 1882. He saw service in the Anglo-Egyptian War later the same year, and was promoted to captain on 14 August 1889.

Towards the end of the 1890s he "took part in the expeditions to Malta and Crete".

Promoted to major on 11 October 1899, he served during the Second Boer War, which began later that same month, serving mainly as a staff officer. Initially, he was a brigade major, then a deputy assistant adjutant general (DAAG), and then an assistant adjutant general (AAG). He received the brevet rank of lieutenant colonel on 29 November 1900.

Following the end of the war in May 1902, he return to the United Kingdom in August. Promoted to brevet colonel in August 1906 and to substantive lieutenant colonel in August 1907, he was made commanding officer (CO) of the 2nd Battalion, Sherwood Foresters.

Promoted to substantive colonel in March 1911, he succeeded Colonel Aylmer Hunter-Weston as a general staff officer, grade 1 (GSO1) in India, His next assignment, which took him back to the United Kingdom, saw him promoted to the temporary rank of brigadier general in May 1913, when he took command of the 3rd Division's 9th Infantry Brigade.

== First World War ==
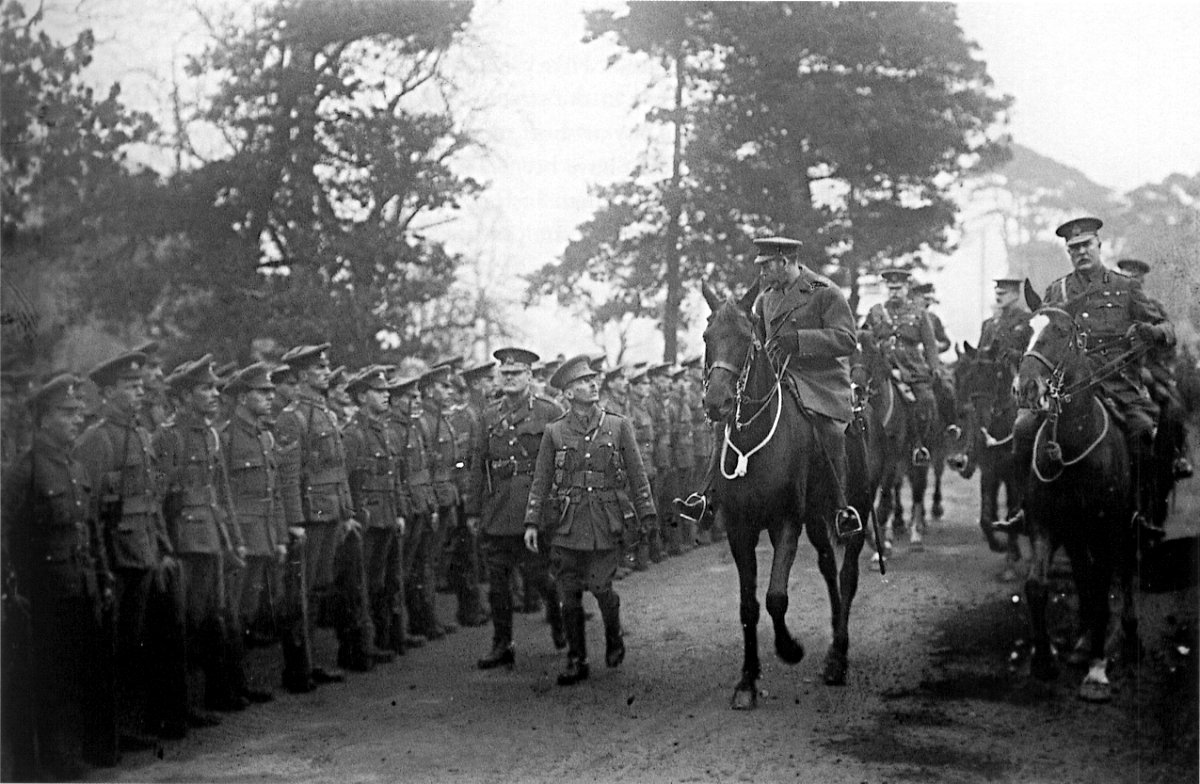
King George V (centre, mounted) inspecting the 29th Division at Dunchurch, Warwickshire, prior to the division's departure for Gallipoli, 12 March 1915. The division's GOC, Major General Shaw, rides alongside the king at the right of the photo.

He served in the First World War, which began in the summer of 1914, initially commanding his brigade in which role he deployed to France with the British Expeditionary Force (BEF). The brigade, under Shaw's command, "was involved in heavy fighting" throughout most of 1914, most notably during the Battle of Mons and the subsequent Great Retreat and later at the First Battle of Ypres. The division suffered heavily in these first few months of the war and saw the loss in action of its first wartime GOC, Major General Hubert Hamilton, along with his successor, Major General Colin Mackenzie. Shaw himself became a casualty when he "was wounded by a shell that hit his HQ on 12 November" and evacuated to Britain. The brigade's war diary records as follows:

12 November 1914. Brigadier-General Shaw, his Staff-Captain, Lt. Harter and Signalling Officer, Lt. Deakin, were wounded by a shell about 10 am.

He was promoted to major general on 28 December "for distinguished conduct in the Field" while recovering from his injuries.

After his recovery, in early 1915, he was in January 1915 appointed as general officer commanding (GOC) of the newly formed 29th Division, the last division of the Regular Army to be created during the war.

Just two months later, however, he was "inexplicably replaced" by Major General Aylmer Hunter-Weston just "two days before the division was deployed to the Mediterranean". He was soon appointed GOC of the 13th (Western) Division, a Kitchener's Army formation made up of civilian volunteers. He led the division in the Gallipoli campaign from its landing until 22 August when, after having "fell sick" on 22 August, was sent home and replaced by Major General Stanley Maude.

He then became director of home defence and subsequently chief of the general staff (CGS) for Home Forces. This was followed in May 1918 by his being appointed as commander-in-chief, Ireland, taking over from Lieutenant General Sir Bryan Mahon and receiving a temporary promotion to lieutenant general.

== Postwar and final years ==
On 19 September 1919, during the Irish War of Independence, he suggested that the police force in Ireland be expanded via the recruitment of a special force of volunteer British ex-servicemen. Following direct intervention from London, the "Black and Tans" and Auxiliary Division of the Constabulary were introduced in order to achieve a decisive result. This intervention preceded a purge of the Irish administration at Dublin Castle during which Shaw himself was replaced.

Shaw, who in June 1919 was promoted to substantive lieutenant general, retired in 1920. He was appointed Honorary Colonel of the 3rd (Reserve) Battalion, Sherwood Foresters, on 11 January 1921.

He died on 6 January 1942, during the Second World War, at the age of 80.

== Bibliography ==
- Davies, Frank; Maddocks, Graham (1995). Bloody Red Tabs: General Officer Casualties of the Great War 1914–1918. London: Pen & Sword Books. ISBN 0850524636.

Military offices
New post	GOC 29th Division; January−March 1915	Succeeded by Aylmer Hunter-Weston
Preceded by H. B. Jeffreys	GOC 13th (Western) Division; March–August 1915	Succeeded by Stanley Maude
Preceded by Sir Bryan Mahon	Commander-in-Chief, Ireland; 1918−1920	Succeeded by Sir Nevil Macready
