= Gordon Macready =

Lieutenant-General Sir Gordon Macready Bt KBE CB CMG DSO MC
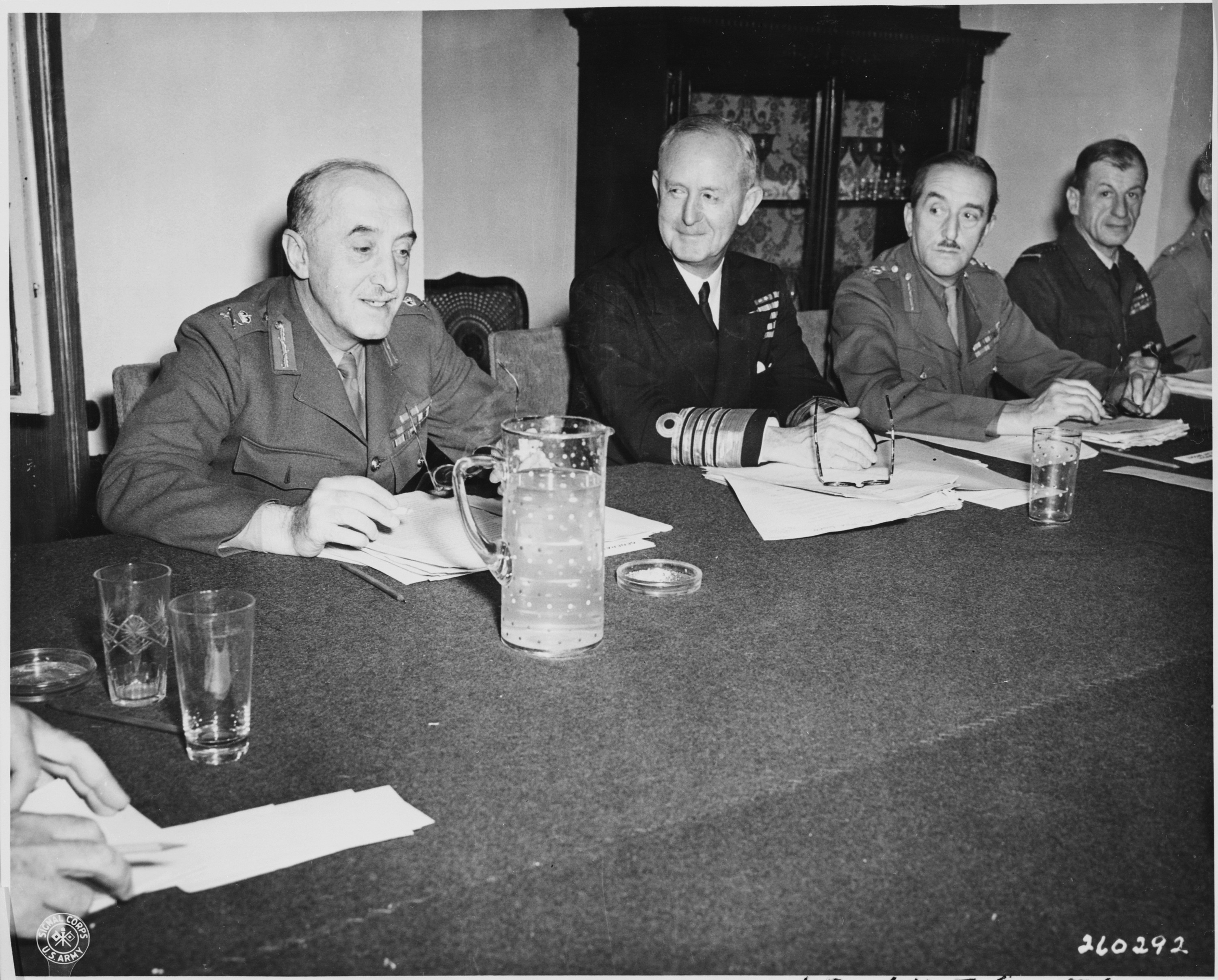
- Taking a part in the Combined Chiefs of Staff discussions at the Potsdam Conference in Germany, 1945. From left to right: Lieutenant-General Sir Gordon Macready, Admiral of the Fleet Sir Andrew Cunningham, and Field Marshal Sir Alan Brooke.
- Born: 5 April 1891; Kandy, Ceylon
- Died: 17 October 1956 (aged 65); Paris, France
- Relatives: Sir Nevil Macready (father)
- Military career
- Allegiance: United Kingdom
- Branch: British Army
- Service years: 1910–1946
- Rank: Lieutenant-General
- Nickname: "Baronet Macready"
- Service number: 22930
- Unit: Royal Engineers
- Conflicts: First World War; Second World War
- Awards: Knight Commander of the Order of the British Empire; Companion of the Order of the Bath; Companion of the Order of St Michael and St George; Distinguished Service Order; Military Cross; Mentioned in Despatches (5); Commander of the Legion of Merit (United States); Grand Officer of the Order of Orange-Nassau (Netherlands); Legion of Honour (France)

Lieutenant-General Sir Gordon Nevil Macready, 2nd Baronet, KBE, CB, CMG, DSO, MC (5 April 1891 – 17 October 1956) was a British Army officer who served as Assistant Chief of the Imperial General Staff during the Second World War.

== Military career ==
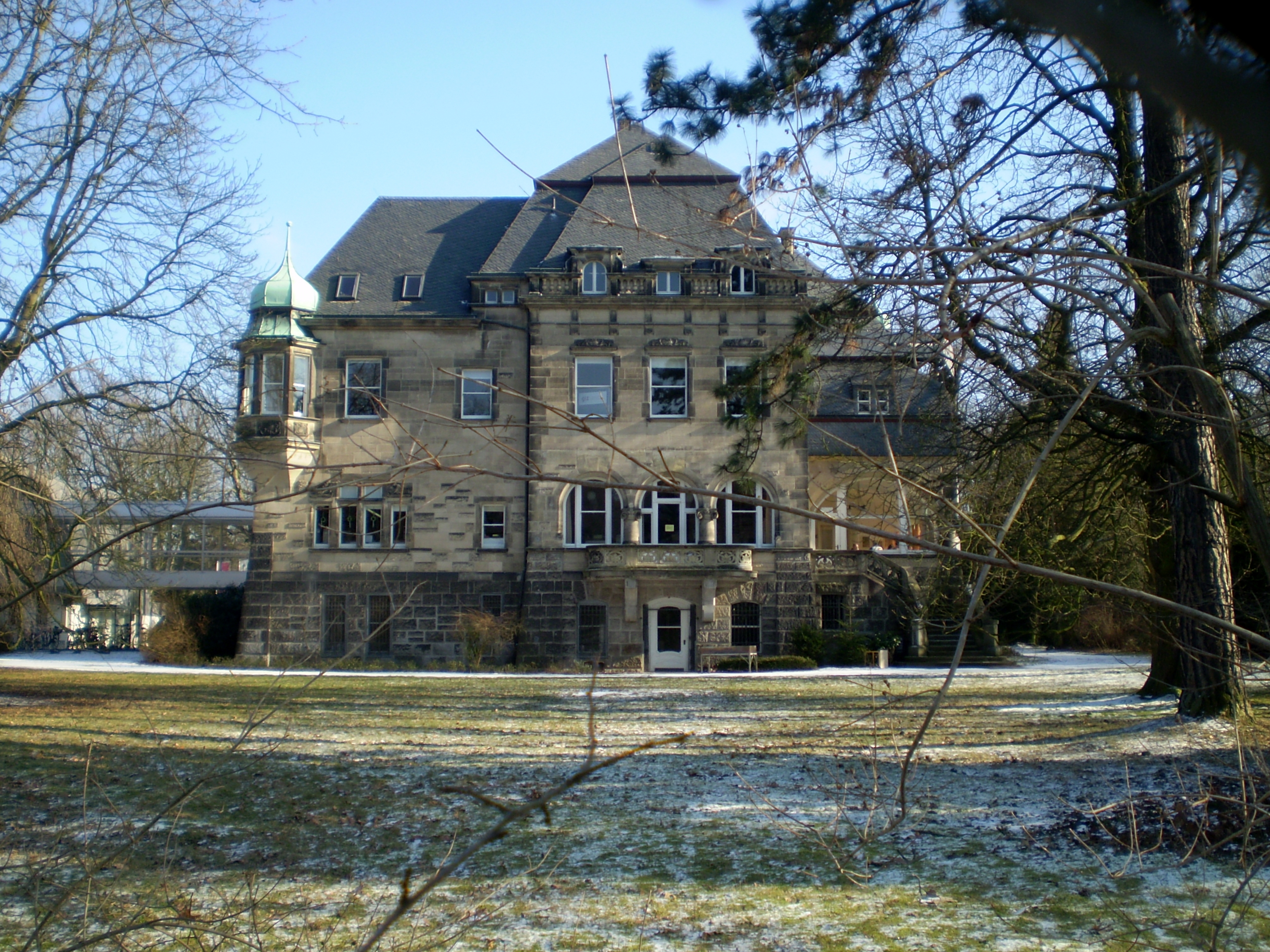
Villa Mauser in Bad Honnef, Residence of Lieutenant-General Sir Gordon Macready from 1949 until his death in 1956.

Born in Kandy, British Ceylon, on 5 April 1891, the son of Sir Nevil Macready, Gordon Macready was sent to England and was educated at Cheltenham College and later entered the Royal Military Academy, Woolwich and was commissioned as a second lieutenant into the Royal Engineers on 23 December 1910.

Promoted to lieutenant on 21 December 1912, Macready served on the Western Front during the First World War becoming an aide-de-camp in November 1914 and later an assistant adjutant and quartermaster general for the 66th (2nd East Lancashire) Division in 1917. He was promoted to captain on 23 December 1916, and brevet major on 3 June 1917. After the war, from April 1919, he became Assistant Adjutant General for the British Military Mission to Berlin.

Attending the Staff College, Camberley, from 1923 to 1924, he was appointed Assistant Secretary to the Committee of Imperial Defence in 1926, which was followed by attendance at the Imperial Defence College in 1933. He was promoted to colonel in April 1934, with seniority backdated to the previous July, and made a GSO1 at the War Office. He was deputy director of staff duties at the War Office in 1936 and head of the British military mission to Egypt in 1938.

He served in the Second World War as Assistant Chief of the Imperial General Staff from October 1940 and as Head of the British Army mission in Washington D. C. from 1942 until his retirement in 1946.

In retirement he became Regional Commissioner for Lower Saxony in 1946, British Chairman of the Economic Control Office for the British and American Zones of Germany in 1947 and then Economic Advisor to the UK High Commissioner in 1949.

He is author of the book In the wake of the great published by Clowes in 1965.

== Family ==
In 1920 he married Elisabeth Pauline Sabine Marie de Noailles; they had one son, Sir Nevil Macready, 3rd Bt.

== Arms ==
Coat of arms of Gordon Macready
Crest On a wreath of the colours in front of two swords points upwards in saltire proper pommels and hilts Or a cubit arm also Proper grasping a snake Vert. Escutcheon Argent on a chevron Azure between three leopard faces Gules two swords the points in saltire Proper pommels and hilts Or. Motto Ad Extremum Tenax

== Bibliography ==
- Mead, Richard (2007). Churchill's Lions: A Biographical Guide to the Key British Generals of World War II. Stroud (UK): Spellmount. p. 544 pages. ISBN 978-1-86227-431-0.
- Smart, Nick (2005). Biographical Dictionary of British Generals of the Second World War. Barnsley, UK: Pen & Sword Military. ISBN 1-84415-049-6.

Baronetage of the United Kingdom
Preceded by Sir Nevil Macready	Baronet (of Cheltenham); 1946−1956	Succeeded by Sir Nevil Macready
Military offices
Preceded by Desmond Anderson	Assistant Chief of the Imperial General Staff; 1940−1942	Succeeded by Daril Watson
