= William Pitcairn Campbell =

British Army general

Lieutenant-General Sir William Pitcairn Campbell KCB
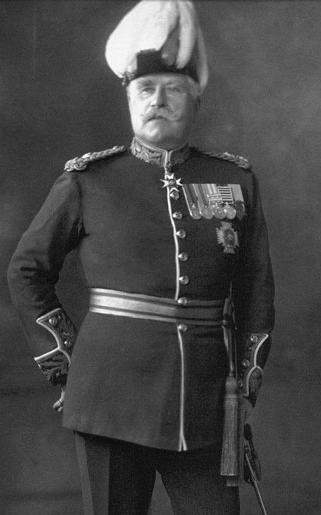
- Born: 20 June 1856
- Died: 22 September 1933 (aged 77)
- Military career
- Allegiance: United Kingdom
- Branch: British Army
- Rank: Lieutenant-General
- Commands: Western Command; Southern Command; 5th Division; 3rd Brigade; 1st Battalion, King's Royal Rifle Corps
- Conflicts: Mahdist War; Second Boer War; First World War
- Awards: Knight Commander of the Order of the Bath

Lieutenant-General Sir William Pitcairn Campbell, KCB (20 June 1856 – 22 September 1933) was a British Army general during the First World War.

== Early life ==
Pitcairn Campbell was the son of James Pitcairn Campbell and his wife, Eleanor (née Eyre), of Burton Hall, Neston. He had two elder sisters, Eliza and Georgina. He was educated at Windlesham House School, Eton College and the Royal Military College, Sandhurst.

== Military career ==
Pitcairn Campbell was commissioned into the King's Royal Rifle Corps in 1875. He served with the Mounted Infantry Camel Corps in Sudan between 1884 and 1885. His battalion served in South Africa from 1899 to 1901 during the Second Boer War. At the Battle of Talana Hill he was wounded and his commanding officer was killed. As second in command, he took command of his battalion and was part of the garrison besieged at Ladysmith. He was subsequently promoted to lieutenant colonel in command of the 1st Battalion on 25 January 1900.

After returning to the United Kingdom, Pitcairn Campbell was appointed to the command of the 14th Provisional Battalion, stationed at Cork. Then in early 1903 he took command of the 3rd battalion King's Royal Rifles also stationed there. He was aide-de-camp to King Edward VII from 1900 to 1907 and was appointed a Companion of the Order of the Bath (CB) in the King's Birthday Honours of June 1906. He was placed on half-pay upon relinquishing command of the battalion in January 1904. Upon returning to normal pay, he succeeded Major General Bruce Hamilton as commander of the 3rd Brigade, part of the 3rd Division of the 1st Army Corps, in May, for which he became a substantive colonel and temporary brigadier general while employed in this role. After being promoted to major general in October 1907, he became general officer commanding 5th Division in 1909.

Promoted to lieutenant general in October 1913, he moved on to be General Officer Commanding-in-Chief of Southern Command from 1914 and General Officer Commanding-in-Chief of Western Command from 1916; he retired on 27 February 1920.

Pitcairn Campbell was appointed a Knight Commander of the Order of the Bath in the 1915 Birthday Honours. In 1916, he was appointed colonel of the Highland Light Infantry, succeeding General Sir Henry Hildyard.

== Family ==
In 1888 a fellow infantry officer, Major Gilbert, who had been serving in India, named Pitcairn Campbell as co-respondent in the divorce case against his wife. The following year, he and Edith Gilbert (née Prothero) married and went on to have one daughter.

Military offices
| Preceded by Herbert Plumer | General Officer Commanding 5th Division; 1909–1913 | Succeeded by Sir Charles Fergusson |
| Preceded by Sir Horace Smith-Dorrien | GOC-in-C Southern Command; 1914–1916 | Succeeded by Sir Henry Sclater |
| Preceded by Sir Henry Mackinnon | GOC-in-C Western Command; 1916–1918 | Succeeded by Sir Thomas Snow |
