= George Harper (British Army officer) =

British Army general

Lieutenant-General Sir George Harper KCB DSO
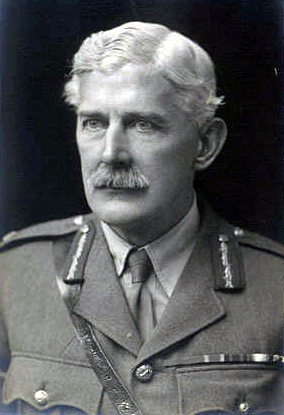
- Born: 11 January 1865; Batheaston, Somerset, England
- Died: 15 December 1922 (aged 57); Sherborne, Dorset, England
- Burial place: London Road Cemetery, Salisbury, Wiltshire
- Military career
- Allegiance: United Kingdom
- Branch: British Army
- Service years: 1884–1922
- Rank: Lieutenant-General
- Unit: Royal Engineers
- Commands: 17th Brigade; 51st (Highland) Division; IV Corps; Southern Command
- Conflicts: Second Boer War; World War I
- Awards: Knight Commander of the Order of the Bath; Distinguished Service Order; Legion of Honour – (1918)

Lieutenant-General Sir George Montague Harper, KCB, DSO (11 January 1865 – 15 December 1922) was a senior officer of the British Army during the First World War.

As a protégé of General Henry Wilson, he held important staff positions at the War Office before the war and at British Expeditionary Force (BEF) GHQ in 1914. He later commanded the 51st (Highland) Division at the Battles of the Ancre, Arras, Third Ypres and Cambrai. It was widely claimed by tank officers that his adoption of idiosyncratic tactics at Cambrai caused his division's failure to reach its objectives, although this view has now been called into question. He commanded IV Corps in 1918.

== Early life ==
George Montague Harper was born on 11 January 1865 in Batheaston, near Bath, Somerset, the son of Charles and Emma Harper. His father was a physician and surgeon.

== Early military career ==
George Harper was educated at Bath College and at the Royal Military Academy, Woolwich. He was commissioned as a lieutenant into the Royal Engineers on 5 July 1884, and promoted to captain on 1 October 1892. In 1899 he was deployed to South Africa where he joined 37th Field Company Royal Engineers and saw action at Spion Kop, Val Kranz, Tugela Heights and Pieter's Hill. He was awarded the Distinguished Service Order (DSO) in November 1900 for his service in South Africa.

== Staff officer ==
Harper was promoted to major on 1 April 1901, and attended the Staff College, Camberley, as a student the same year. Following his graduation from Camberley, he was appointed a staff captain at headquarters on 15 October 1902, before being made a deputy assistant quartermaster general in July 1903. He later returned to the Staff College, first taking over from Colonel Launcelot Kiggell as a deputy assistant adjutant general (DAAG) and was promoted to temporary lieutenant colonel while holding his appointment, from the same date. He returned there later where he served on the directing staff from May 1908 to December 1910.

Harper accompanied Henry Wilson, then Commandant of the Staff College, on his reconnaissance of the likely future theatre of war. In August 1908, along with Edward Perceval ("Perks"), they explored south of Namur by train and bicycle. In August 1909 Harper and Wilson travelled from Mons then down the French frontier almost as far as Switzerland. In the spring of the following year, this time by motor car, they travelled from Rotterdam into Germany, then explored the German side of the frontier, noting the new railway lines and "many sidings" which had been built near St Vith and Bitburg (to allow concentration of German troops near the Ardennes).

== Military operations ==
He became deputy director of military operations (DDMO) at the War Office in 1911 (serving under Wilson, DMO). From June 1911 Harper, who the next month was promoted to colonel, headed M.O.1 section. After the Agadir Crisis Gen Sir Percy Radcliffe wrote that M.O.1, formerly "academic and sterile", "became the mainspring of all our preparations for war".

Because of the need for secrecy, Harper's MO1 was tiny – ten officers, three of them seconded from the Quartermaster-General's Department. Secret documents (e.g. railway timetables) were typed up by officers rather than (enlisted) clerks and printed on a secret printing press. By 14 November 1912, after two years of work, the railway timetables were ready for the assembly of the BEF, prior to sea transport to France.

When Deputy Director of Military Operations, Colonel Harper minuted (1 October 1913) that in the event of war corps should simply be "post boxes" to relay the decisions of GHQ to divisions – this view would gradually be revised in the course of the war, and by the latter part of World War One experienced corps commanders were taking on more and more autonomy over operations.

== First World War ==
=== GHQ ===
On the outbreak of war Colonel Harper was placed in charge of the Oa (planning operations and written orders) section at BEF GHQ. The I (intelligence) and Ob (written records) sections were subordinate to Oa, making Oa in practice something of a bottleneck. He had a poor relationship with the BEF chief of staff Murray, as he was used to working with Murray's deputy and rival Wilson. On 24 August (the day after the Battle of Mons) Harper refused to do anything for Murray, so that Lord Loch had to write messages even though it was not his job. Wilson had to intercede to prevent Sir John French from sacking Harper (Wilson diary 7 Sep) but a week later recorded (Wilson diary 14 Sep), that Murray and Harper argued constantly. Robertson (Quarter-Master-General of the BEF) was known to remark - by one account to some visiting politicians at Abbeville in 1914 who saw the letters written on a door - that "Oa" stood for "Old 'Arper".

Robertson, now BEF chief of staff, removed Harper – who had been promoted temporary brigadier-general in November - "in a very untactful way" (Rawlinson diary 29 Jan & 8 Feb 1915) whilst Wilson was away touring the French front. Robertson separated Staff Duties and Intelligence out from Operations into separate sections, each headed by a Brigadier-General. Although Harper's removal was part of a restructuring at GHQ, his successor Whigham was more focussed and approachable than Harper.

=== Division commander ===
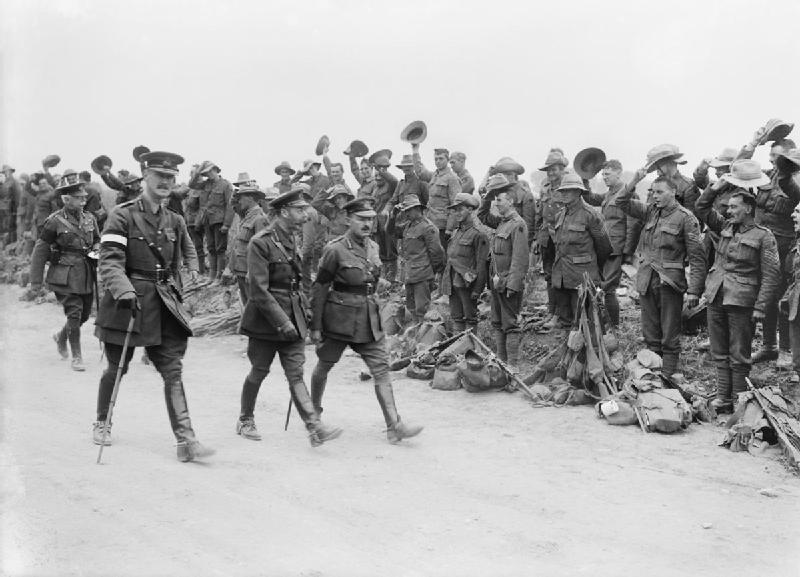
HM King George V (front centre), with General Plumer (behind KGV), Lieutenant General Godley (on KGV's right) and Major General Harper (on KGV's left), inspecting men of the New Zealand Division about to entrain at Steenwerck, France, August 1916.

In February 1915, after being promoted to the temporary rank of brigadier general, he succeeded W. R. B. Doran in command of the 17th Infantry Brigade, part of the 6th Division. Harper later briefly succeeded to Wilson's old job as director of military operations. In September 1915 he was promoted to temporary major general and became general officer commanding (GOC) of the 51st (Highland) Division which saw action during the Battle of the Somme the following year.

Harper, promoted to the substantive rank of major general in January 1916 "for distinguished service in the Field", remained a favourite of Wilson, and throughout 1916, whilst Wilson commanded IV Corps, they would – as Andy Simpson puts it – regularly "meet, eat and criticise others". He told Wilson (24 September 1916) that GHQ was out of touch with the troops and had no knowledge and no imagination.

Harper's 51st Division took part in the Battle of the Ancre. He blamed the failure on the creeping barrage being too fast, causing his "impetuous" men to become caught up in their own barrage.

=== Arras ===
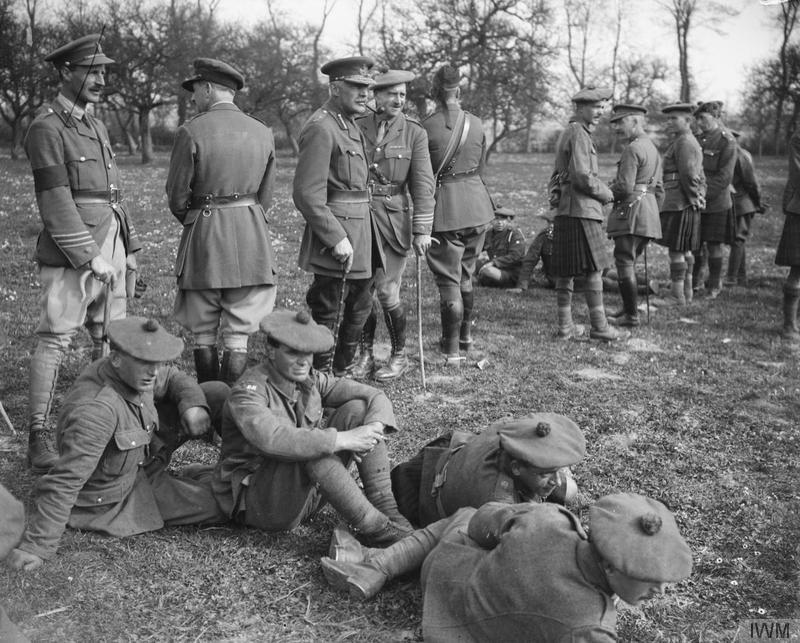
Major-General Harper and Colonel Henry Holmes Sutherland, CO of the 1/7th Battalion, Black Watch (both in the middle), watching the sports meeting held by the battalion at Bailleul-aux-Cornailles, May 1917.

Harper's division also saw action in the Battle of Arras in spring 1917. Spears commented on Harper's interest in training prior to the Battle of Arras, and remarked on the steep improvement in many divisions in this regard since the Somme. The 51st Division, known initially as "Harper's Duds", was later described as "one of the two or three best divisions in France" under Harper's leadership.

Spears described him as "fine-looking, with an aquiline nose and snow-white hair, although his moustache was black". He was known as "Uncle" or, occasionally, "Daddy". Lieutenant-Colonel Walter Nicholson commented that his experience of working with Territorials made him the right man to encourage the individualism of Highlanders, and that he had "the makings of a great general". Cyril Falls commented that "He had a touch of showmanship which troops like when it is combined with efficiency".

In June 1917 Wilson – who had himself just declined the job - recommended Harper for command of XIII Corps, but Haig appointed Frederick McCracken instead.

=== Third Ypres ===
Lieutenant General Ivor Maxse (GOC XVIII Corps) wrote a glowing report of Harper's performance between 31 July and 22 September 1917 (he was highly critical of H. D. Fanshawe of 58th Division and Cuthbert, 39th Division). Maxse's report stressed Harper's skill both at training and command, and mentioned the improvement in the 51st Division, and recommended him for promotion to corps command.

"His division is organised from top to bottom in all departments and he handles it in a masterly manner in active operations. I knew the 51st Division before General Harper commanded it and then considered it ill-organised and unsoldierlike. It is now one of the two or three best divisions in France and its fighting record is well known. I attribute its success mainly to its present commander."

51st Division took part in Gough's attacks to assist Plumer's offensive at Menin Road (September 1917). In an attempt to economise on soldiers' lives, he attacked with only one brigade, reinforced to six battalions, unlike most divisions which attacked with two brigades ("two up") and one in reserve. However, his division was driven back by German counterattacks.

=== Cambrai ===
Harper's 51st Division also took part in the Battle of Cambrai in November 1917.

Harper's tactical plan for Cambrai was for his infantry to follow the tanks in line. He was entitled to draw up his own plan under "Field Service Regulations", and Braithwaite of 62nd Division had also adopted his own tactics. These tactics were based on previous experience of infantry-tank cooperation, and concern that infantry in column might suffer excess casualties before being able to return fire. Christopher Baker-Carr later claimed in his memoirs (From Chauffeur to Brigadier – 1930) that the attack on Flesquieres failed as a result of Harper using his own idiosyncratic tactical drill. Although widely repeated, this claim is dismissed by Bryn Hammond as "plainly rot" – Baker-Carr made no such complaint at the time (he in fact praised the arrangements), it is not corroborated in other contemporary accounts, and it was Baker-Carr's own brigade which failed.

To retake Fontaine on 23 November, Harper concurred with the brigade commander Henry Pelham Burn's suggestion to attack with only two of his seven battalions in a misguided attempt to conserve lives.

Bryn Hammond attributes Harper's failure to take Flesquieres to a strong German defence, to the holding back of his reserve brigade, and partly to the overextended command and control structure (Harper had sited his HQ too far back, 8,000 yards (over 4.5 miles) behind the original British front line, and 7 miles from Flesquieres).

Brigadier-General Hardress-Lloyd (GOC 3 Tank Brigade) thought Harper "an old ass" and claimed (according to the May 1918 journals of J.F.C. Fuller) that he had expressed scepticism about the new tactics of infantry advancing in single file ("worms") and had remarked that they should advance in line as if "you were walking arm-in-arm with a girl". Hardress-Lloyd claimed to have retorted "if the late Oscar Wilde were walking with you, where do you think he would go?” and that Harper almost had to be "carried from the room in an ambulance".

=== Corps commander ===
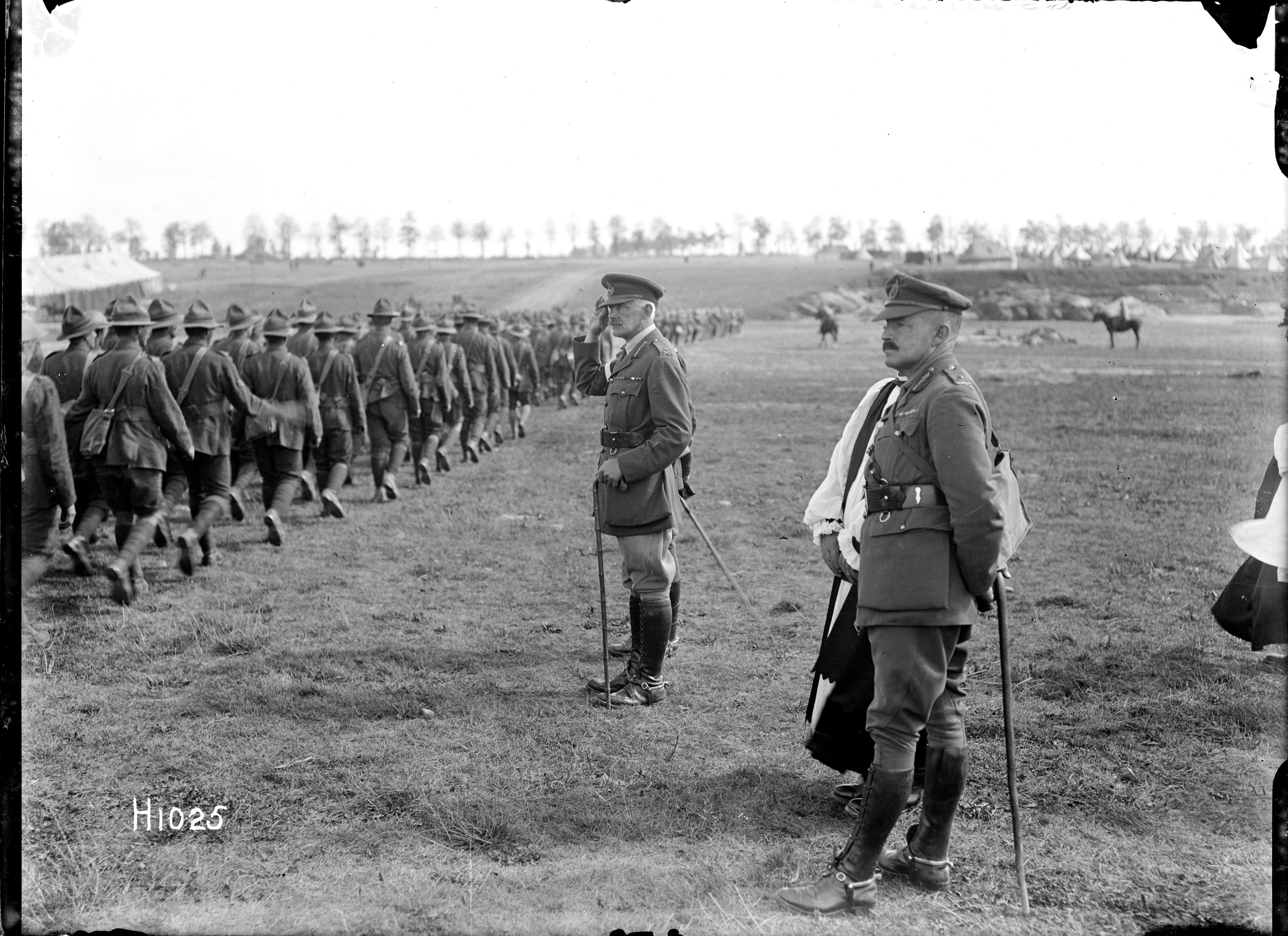
Lieutenant General G. M. Harper, GOC IV Corps, taking the salute after a New Zealand Division church service in France in September 1918. The division's GOC, Major General Andrew Hamilton Russell, stands in the right foreground.

Harper was promoted to temporary lieutenant general and to GOC IV Corps on 11 March 1918, as part of a reshuffle in which a number of older corps commanders were retired from front-line command. He held this command, part of the British Third Army under General Sir Julian Byng, until the end of the war.

Harper and his colleague, Lieutenant General Aylmer Haldane, GOC VI Corps, are described by Travers as "seasoned and reliable commanders". Nonetheless they suffered command problems in the early stages of the March retreat, particularly on 26 March when the Germans were rumoured to be breaking through at Hebuterne.

In September, during the Hundred Days Offensive, during the period after the Battle of Albert and whilst Byng's Third Army was advancing towards the Hindenburg Line, Haldane regularly vented in his diary about Harper's supposed shortcomings. At one point Haldane lobbied the Army commander to urge Harper to make quicker progress, and when Byng pointed out that IV Corps were making progress, recorded "I should "progress" by sending Harper to the rear". Haldane was concerned that Third Army orders gave Harper (on Haldane's right, i.e. southern flank) "an excuse for not coming forward at the same time as my Corps" (22 September). Haldane appealed to Byng, who refused to overrule Harper. Haldane attributed this to their lack of experience of the NorthWest Frontier. Byng's decision was wrong and Haldane's advance was thus hampered by Harper's failure to seize the high ground.

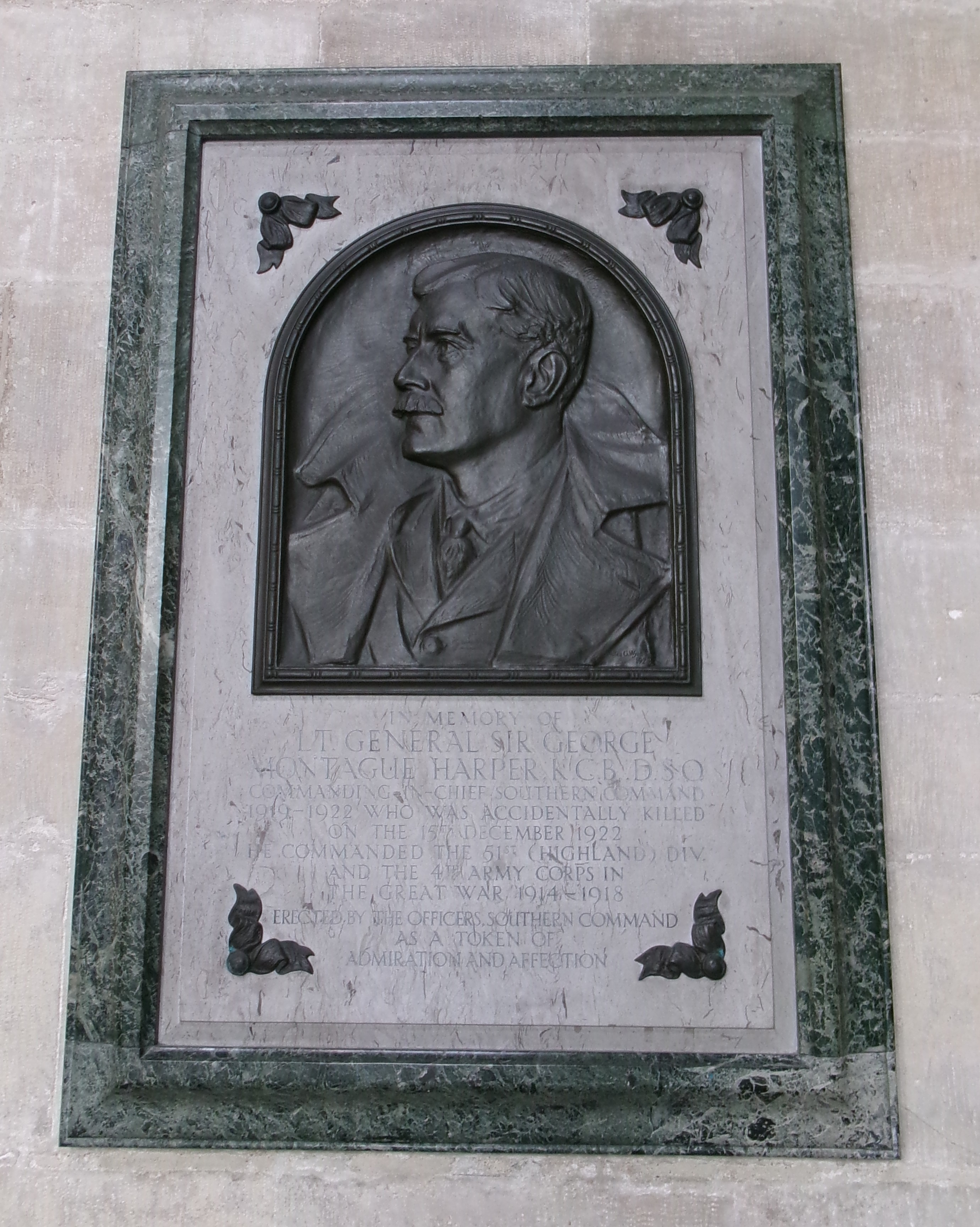
Memorial in Salisbury Cathedral

== Postwar ==
After the war, in January 1919, Harper was promoted to the substantive rank of lieutenant-general and in June became general officer commanding-in-chief of Southern Command, taking over from General Sir Henry Sclater. On 15 December 1922 Harper was driving from Sherborne to Bradford Abbas when his car skidded and overturned, he died of a fractured skull and his wife was injured.

== Honours and awards ==
- 27 September 1901 - Captain (now Major) George Montague Harper is appointed a Companion of the Distinguished Service Order in recognition for services during operations in South Africa.
- 18 February 1915 - Colonel (Temporary Brigadier-General) George Montague Harper DSO is appointed a Companion of the Order of the Bath in recognition of the meritorious service during the war.
- 1 January 1918 - Major-General George Montague Harper CB DSO is promoted to Knight Commander of the Order of the Bath for valuable services rendered in connection with military operations in the field.

Harper also was awarded foreign decorations; Legion of Honour, French Croix de Guerre, Belgian Croix de Guerre, Grand Cross of the Belgian Order of Leopold and the Serbian White Eagle.

== Family ==
He married Ella Constance Jackson in 1893.

== Sources ==
- Boff, Jonathan (2012). Winning and Losing on the Western Front. Cambridge: Cambridge University Press. ISBN 978-1-1074-4902-2.
- Hammond, Bryn (2008). Cambrai, The Myth of the First Great Tank Battle. Weidenfeld & Nicolson, London. ISBN 978-0-7538-2605-8.
- Jeffery, Keith (2006). Field Marshal Sir Henry Wilson: A Political Soldier. Oxford University Press. ISBN 978-0-19-820358-2.Harper
- Robbins, Simon (2005). British Generalship on the Western Front. Abingdon: Routledge. ISBN 0-415-40778-8.
- Sheffield, Gary; Todman, Dan (2004). Command and Control on the Western Front. Stroud: Spellmount. ISBN 978-1-86227-420-4.
- Simpson, Andy (2006). Directing Operations: British Corps Command on the Western Front 1914-18. Stroud: Spellmount. ISBN 1-86227-292-1.
- Travers, Tim (1987). The Killing Ground. Allen & Unwin. ISBN 0-85052-964-6.
- Travers, Tim (1992). How the War Was Won. Routledge. ISBN 978-1-84415-207-0.

Military offices
Preceded by Richard Bannatine-Allason	GOC 51st (Highland) Division; 1915–1918	Succeeded by George Carter-Campbell
Preceded by Charles Woollcombe	GOC IV Corps; March–November 1918	Post disbanded
Preceded by Sir Henry Sclater	GOC-in-C Southern Command; 1919–1922	Succeeded by Sir Walter Congreve
