= Macready baronets =

Baronetcy in the Baronetage of the United Kingdom

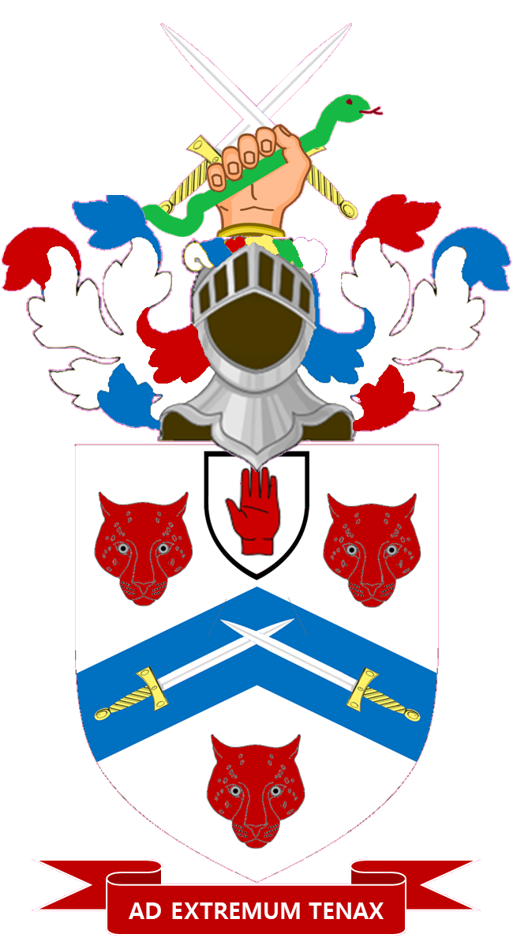
- Crest: On a wreath of the colours in front of two swords points upwards in saltire proper pommels and hilts Or a cubit arm also Proper grasping a snake Vert.
- Shield: Argent on a chevron Azure between three leopard faces Gules two swords the points in saltire Proper pommels and hilts Or.
- Motto: Latin: Ad Extremum Tenax English: Unmoved to the end

The Macready Baronetcy, of Cheltenham in the County of Gloucester, is a title in the Baronetage of the United Kingdom. It was created on 1 March 1923 for General Nevil Macready. He was Commissioner of the Metropolitan Police from 1918 to 1920 and Commander-in-Chief of Ireland from 1920 to 1922. He was succeeded by his son, the second Baronet. He was a Lieutenant-General in the Army and held several administrative posts in occupied Germany after the Second World War. The third Baronet was managing director of Mobil Oil from 1975 to 1985.

William Charles Macready, father of the first Baronet, was an actor.

== Macready baronets, of Cheltenham (1923) ==
- Sir Cecil Frederick Nevil Macready, 1st Baronet (1862–1946)
- Sir Gordon Nevil Macready, 2nd Baronet (1891–1956)
- Sir Nevil John Wilfrid Macready, 3rd Baronet (1921–2014)
- Sir Charles Nevil Macready, 4th Baronet (born 1955)

The heir apparent is the present holder's son James Nevil Macready (born 1982).
