= Robert Montgomery (British Army officer) =

British army officer

Major-General Robert Montgomery CB CVO
- Born: 7 September 1848
- Died: 1931 (aged 82–83)
- Military career
- Allegiance: United Kingdom
- Branch: British Army
- Service years: 1868–1915
- Rank: Major-General
- Unit: Royal Artillery
- Commands: Southern District; South Coast Defences; Transvaal District
- Conflicts: First World War
- Awards: Companion of the Order of the Bath; Commander of the Royal Victorian Order

Major-General Robert Arthur Montgomery, CB, CVO (7 September 1848 – 1931) was a British Army officer who commanded Southern District.

== Military career ==
After graduating from the Royal Military Academy, Woolwich, Montgomery was commissioned into the Royal Artillery in July 1868.

He was promoted to colonel and made deputy director general of ordnance at the War Office on 10 January 1897, and was appointed Commander Royal Artillery for Southern District, based in Portsmouth, in November 1902, with the rank of major-general. A year later, he became General Officer Commanding Southern District, also based in Portsmouth. He went on to be General Officer Commanding South Coast Defences in April 1904 and then succeeded Major General Theodore Stephenson as General Officer Commanding Transvaal District on 23 June 1906 before returning to England in April 1908. In October 1908 he served on an ordnance board.

He retired from the army in September 1910.

He served briefly in the First World War initially as a General Officer Commanding the 22nd Division of Lord Kitchener's Army at Seaford and then as Director of Recruiting in the autumn of 1915.

He came from Greyabbey, Ireland but lived at Pentrepant, in the parish of Selattyn, near Oswestry in Shropshire. He was appointed a Companion of the Order of the Bath (CB) in the June 1902 Coronation Honours list.

Military offices
Preceded by Sir Baker Russell	GOC Southern District; 1903–1904	Succeeded by Sir Evelyn Wood (As GOC-in-C Southern Command)
