= Southern Command (United Kingdom) =

- Active: 1793–1972
- Country: United Kingdom
- Branch: British Army
- Type: Command
- Size: 62,000 troops
- Garrison/HQ: Portsmouth (1793–1901); Tidworth Camp (1901–1949); Fugglestone St Peter (1949–1972)

Southern Command was a Command of the British Army.

== Nineteenth century ==
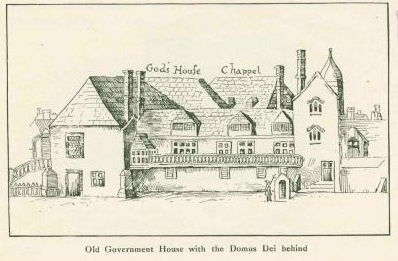
Government House, Grand Parade, Portsmouth, command headquarters from 1793 to 1826

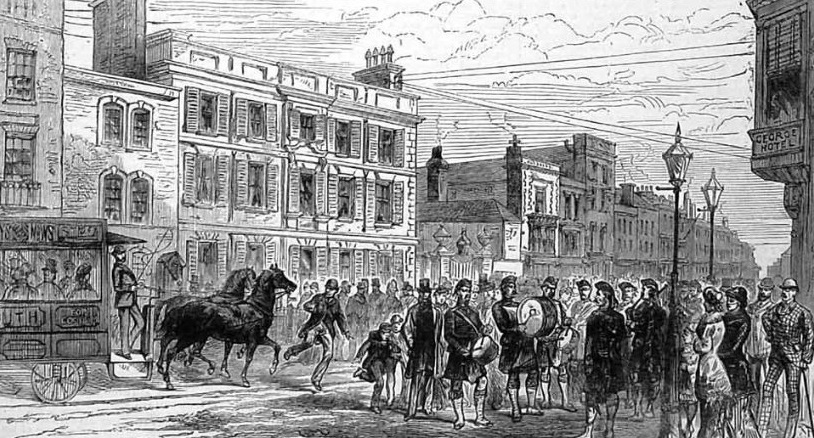
Government House, High Street, Portsmouth, command headquarters from 1826 to 1882

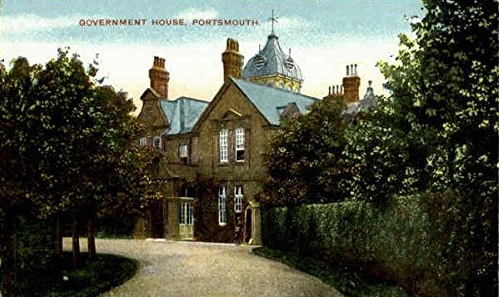
Government House, Cambridge Road, Portsmouth, command headquarters from 1882 to 1901

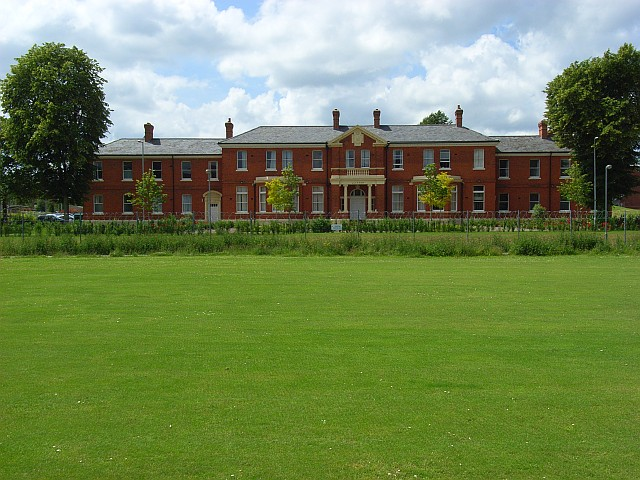
Tidworth Camp, command headquarters from 1901 to 1949

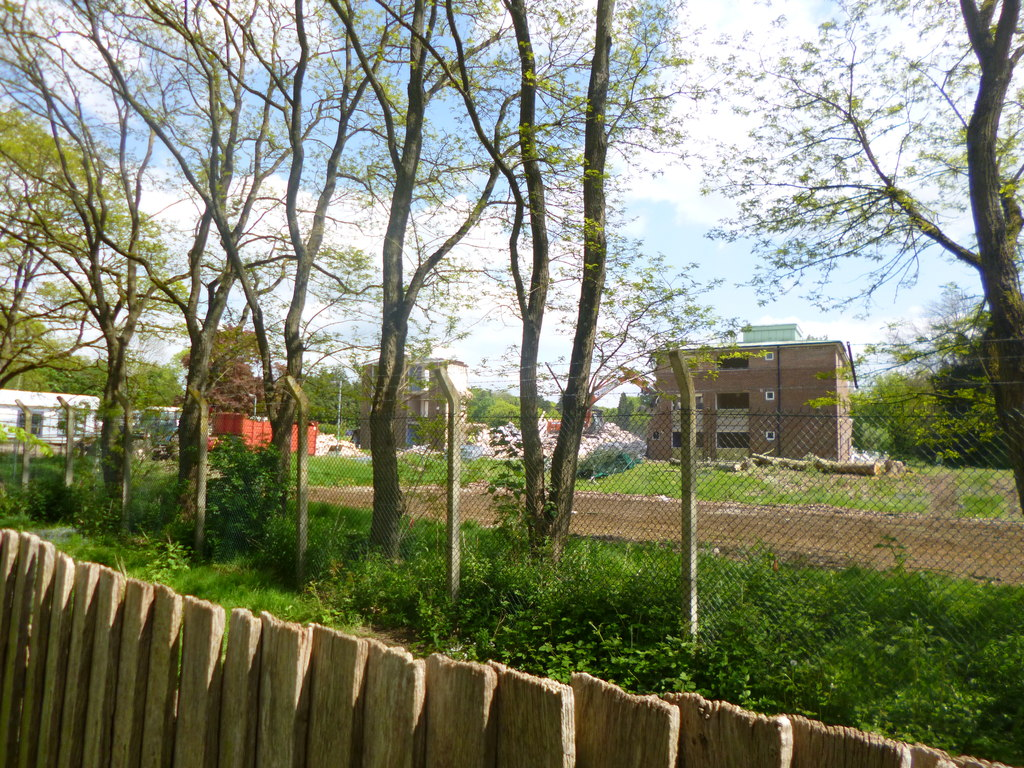
Erskine Barracks, Fugglestone St Peter, command headquarters from 1949 to 1972

Great Britain was divided into military districts on the outbreak of war with France in 1793. By the 1830s the command included the counties of Kent and Sussex (the original Southern District during the Napoleonic Wars) as well as Bedfordshire, Northamptonshire, Oxfordshire and Buckinghamshire (the original South Inland District) and Hampshire, Wiltshire and Dorset (the original South-West District) and Gloucestershire, Worcestershire and Herefordshire (the original Severn District).

The role of South-West District Commander, which was doubled hatted with that of Lieutenant-Governor of Portsmouth, was originally based at Government House in Grand Parade in Portsmouth. This building became very dilapidated and a new Government House was established in the High Street in Portsmouth in 1826. In January 1876 a ‘Mobilization Scheme for the forces in Great Britain and Ireland’ was published, with the ‘Active Army’ divided into eight army corps based on the District Commands. 5th Corps was to be formed within Southern Command, based at Salisbury. This scheme disappeared in 1881, when the districts were retitled ‘District Commands. A third Government House, which was built in red brick on Cambridge Road in Portsmouth, was completed in 1882.

== Twentieth century ==
The 1901 Army Estimates introduced by St John Brodrick allowed for six army corps based on six regional commands. As outlined in a paper published in 1903, II Corps was to be formed in a reconstituted Southern Command, with HQ at Salisbury Plain. Lieutenant General Sir Evelyn Wood was appointed acting General Officer Commanding-in-Chief (GOCinC) of Southern Command on 1 October 1901. Southern Command was initially based at Tidworth Camp.

=== First World War ===
At the end of 1914, Lieutenant General Sir Horace Smith-Dorrien, the GOCinC, left Southern Command to form II Corps in France, and Lieutenant General William Campbell was placed in command. On 8 March 1916, Lieutenant-General Sir Henry Sclater, took charge of Southern Command. Sclater served as GOC-in-C there until May 1919.

=== Second World War ===
In 1939 regular troops reporting to Southern Command included 1st Armoured Division, based at Andover, and 3rd Infantry Division, based at Bulford. Other Regular Troops reporting to Southern Command at war time included:

- 8th Royal Tank Regiment
- 9th Field Regiment, Royal Artillery
- 6/23 Field Battery, 12th Field Regiment, Royal Artillery
- 3rd Medium Regiment, Royal Artillery
- 4th Anti-Aircraft Regiment, Royal Artillery
- 1st Survey Regiment, Royal Artillery
- 2nd Survey Regiment, Royal Artillery
- 2nd Searchlight Regiment, Royal Artillery

=== Post War ===
The command moved to Erskine Barracks near Fugglestone St Peter in Wiltshire in 1949. From 1955 to 1961 it included the TA 30th Anti-Aircraft Brigade with its headquarters at Edenbridge in Kent.

In 1968, a new command (Army Strategic Command) was formed at Erskine Barracks, largely staffed by the Southern Command personnel already based there. At the same time a new HQ Southern Command was established at Hounslow Barracks, into which was merged HQ Eastern Command (which was thence disestablished as a separate command). This new, expanded Southern Command, with geographical responsibility across the old Eastern and Southern command areas, was itself merged into HQ UK Land Forces (HQ UKLF) in 1972.

=== Formation sign variants ===
During the Second World War and after, Southern Command, in common with other UK Commands, used its formation sign as a badge, (or flash) on uniforms. The HQ sign itself (see top of this article) with its horizontal red, black, red background colouring indicated an army level command, on which were five stars of the Southern Cross. Uniquely in Southern Command the background colour of the shield, and occasionally the stars, was changed to show the colours of the service corps of the personnel, other commands used their formation sign with an arm of service stripe (1/4 inch (0.64 cm) thick) below it. The various designs and changes for visibility or similarity are shown below.

Southern Command Royal Armoured Corps (Vertical red/yellow halves with white and red stars)

Southern Command Royal Regiment of Artillery (Vertical blue/red halves with white stars)

Southern Command Royal Engineers (Red with a blue diagonal line and white stars)

Southern Command Royal Corps of Signals (Vertical blue/white halves with white and blue stars)

Southern Command Infantry (Red with white stars)

Southern Command Royal Army Medical Corps (Maroon with white stars)

Southern Command Royal Army Service Corps (first pattern) (Yellow with white stars)

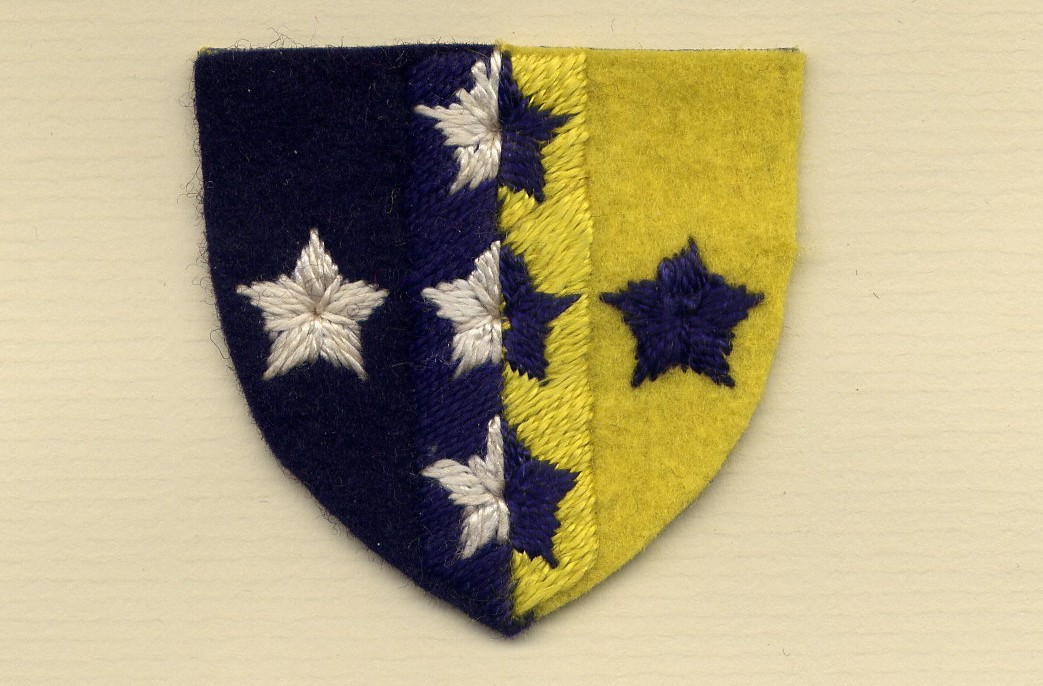
Southern Command Royal Army Service Corps (second pattern) (Vertical blue/yellow halves with white and blue stars)

Southern Command Royal Army Ordnance Corps (first pattern) (Blue with white stars)

Southern Command Royal Army Ordnance Corps (second pattern) (Red with a vertical blue stripe and white stars)

Southern Command Royal Electrical and Mechanical Engineers (Three vertical red, yellow, blue stripes with blue vertical stars and two white outer stars)

Southern Command Corps of Military Police (Vertical red/black halves with white stars)

Southern Command Royal Army Dental Corps (Vertical green/white halves with white and green stars)

Southern Command Royal Army Pay Corps (Yellow with blue stars)

Southern Command Army Education Corps (first pattern) (Light blue with white stars)

Southern Command Army Education Corps (second pattern) (Dark blue with light blue stars)

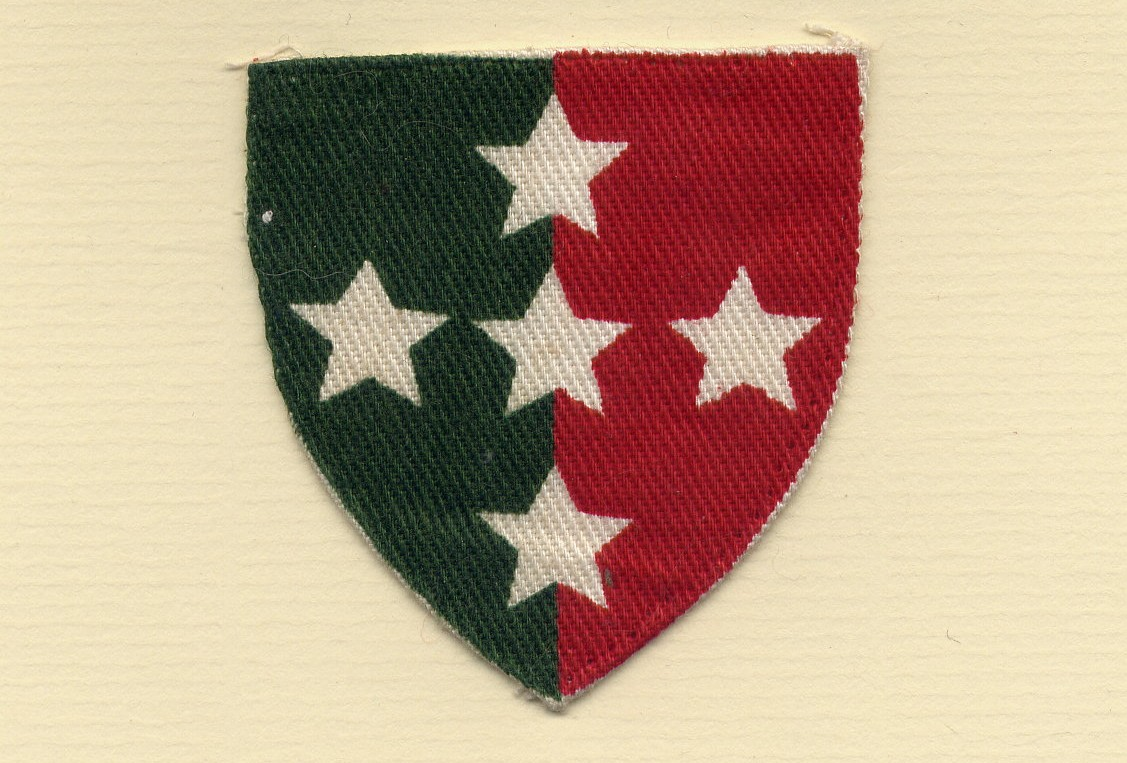
Southern Command Royal Pioneer Corps (Vertical green/red halves with white stars)

Southern Command Intelligence Corps (Green with white stars)

Southern Command Army Physical Training Corps (Black with red stars)

Southern Command Auxiliary Territorial Service (Brown with a green border and light brown stars)

Southern Command Army Catering Corps (Grey with yellow stars)

Southern Command miscellaneous units post WW2 (Black over red horiztontal split)

== General Officers Commanding ==
GOCs have included:
General Officer Commanding South-West District

- 1793–1796 Colonel Thomas Trigge
- 1796–1799 Lieutenant-General Cornelius Cuyler
- February–June 1799 Major-General Thomas Murray
- 1799–1804 Major-General John Whitelocke
- 1804–1805 Colonel Hildebrand Oakes
- June–December 1805 Major-General Hon. John Hope
- 1805–1808 Major-General Sir George Prevost
- 1808–1813 Major-General Arthur Whetham
- May–July 1813 Lieutenant-General Hon. Thomas Maitland
- January–September 1814 Major-General William Houston
- 1814–1819 Major-General Kenneth Howard
- August–October 1819 Major-General Sir James Kempt
- 1819–1821 Major-General Sir George Cooke
- 1821–1828 Major-General Sir James Lyon
- 1828–1834 Major-General Sir Colin Campbell
- 1834–1839 Major-General Sir Thomas McMahon
- 1839–1846 Major-General Sir Hercules Robert Pakenham
- 1847–1851 Lieutenant-General Lord Frederick FitzClarence
- 1851–1852 Major-General Sir George D'Aguilar
- 1852–1855 Major-General Sir James Simpson
- 1855–1857 Major-General Henry William Breton
- 1857–1860 Lieutenant-General the Hon. Sir James Scarlett
- 1860–1865 Major-General Lord William Paulet

General Officer Commanding Southern District

- 1865–1870 Lieutenant-General Sir George Buller
- 1870–1874 General Viscount Templetown
- 1874–1877 General Sir Charles Hastings Doyle
- 1877–1878 General Sir John Garvock
- 1878–1884 General Prince Edward of Saxe-Weimar-Eisenach
- 1884–1889 General Sir George Willis
- 1889–1890 General the Hon. Sir Leicester Smyth
- 1890–1893 Lieutenant-General the Duke of Connaught and Strathearn
- 1893–1898 Major General Sir John Davis
- 1898–1903 Lieutenant General Sir Baker Creed Russell
- 1903–1904 Major General Robert Montgomery

Commander Second Army Corps

In 1901 Second Army Corps was formed, with South East District at Dover, Southern District at Portsmouth and Western District at Devonport under command.

- 1901–1904 Lieutenant General Sir Evelyn Wood

General Officer Commanding Southern Command

- 1905–1909 Lieutenant General Sir Ian Hamilton
- 1909–1912 Lieutenant General Sir Charles Douglas
- 1912–1914 Lieutenant General Sir Horace Smith-Dorrien
- 1914–1916 Lieutenant General Sir William Campbell
- 1916–1919 Lieutenant General Sir Henry Sclater
- 1919–1922 Lieutenant General Sir George Harper
- 1923–1924 Lieutenant General Sir Walter Congreve
- 1924–1928 Lieutenant General Sir Alexander Godley
- 1928–1931 Lieutenant General Sir Archibald Montgomery-Massingberd
- 1931–1933 Lieutenant General Sir Cecil Romer
- 1933–1934 Lieutenant General Sir Percy Radcliffe
- 1934–1938 Lieutenant General Sir John Burnett-Stuart
- 1938–1939 Lieutenant General Sir Archibald Wavell
- July–August 1939 Lieutenant General Sir Alan Brooke
- September 1939 – June 1940 Lieutenant General Sir Bertie Fisher
- June–July 1940 Lieutenant General Sir Alan Brooke
- July–November 1940 Lieutenant General Sir Claude Auchinleck
- December 1940 – February 1942 Lieutenant General Sir Harold Alexander
- March 1942 – February 1944 Lieutenant General Sir Charles Loyd
- February 1944 – February 1945 Lieutenant General Sir William Morgan
- March–June 1945 Lieutenant General Sir Sidney Kirkman
- 1945–1947 Lieutenant General Sir John Crocker
- 1947–1948 Lieutenant General Sir John Harding
- 1949–1952 Lieutenant General Sir Ouvry Roberts
- 1952–1955 Lieutenant General Sir Ernest Down
- 1955–1958 Lieutenant General Sir George Erskine
- 1958–1961 Lieutenant General Sir Nigel Poett
- 1961–1963 Lieutenant General Sir Robert Bray
- 1964–1966 Lieutenant General Sir Kenneth Darling
- 1966–1968 Lieutenant General Sir Geoffrey Baker
- 1968 Lieutenant General Sir John Mogg
- 1968–1969 Lieutenant General Sir David Peel Yates
- 1969–1971 Lieutenant General Sir Michael Carver
- 1971–1972 Lieutenant General Sir Basil Eugster

== Sources ==
- Cole, Howard (1973). Formation Badges of World War 2. Britain, Commonwealth and Empire. London: Arms and Armour Press. ISBN 978-0853680789.
- Smythies, Raymond Henry (1894). Historical Records of the 40th (2nd Somersetshire) Regiment. A. W. Swiss. p. 442.
