= John Macdonald (British Army officer, died 1850) =

British Army officer (c.1795–1850)

Lieutenant-General Sir John Macdonald GCB
- Died: 1850
- Military career
- Allegiance: United Kingdom
- Branch: British Army
- Rank: Lieutenant-General
- Awards: Knight Grand Cross of the Order of the Bath

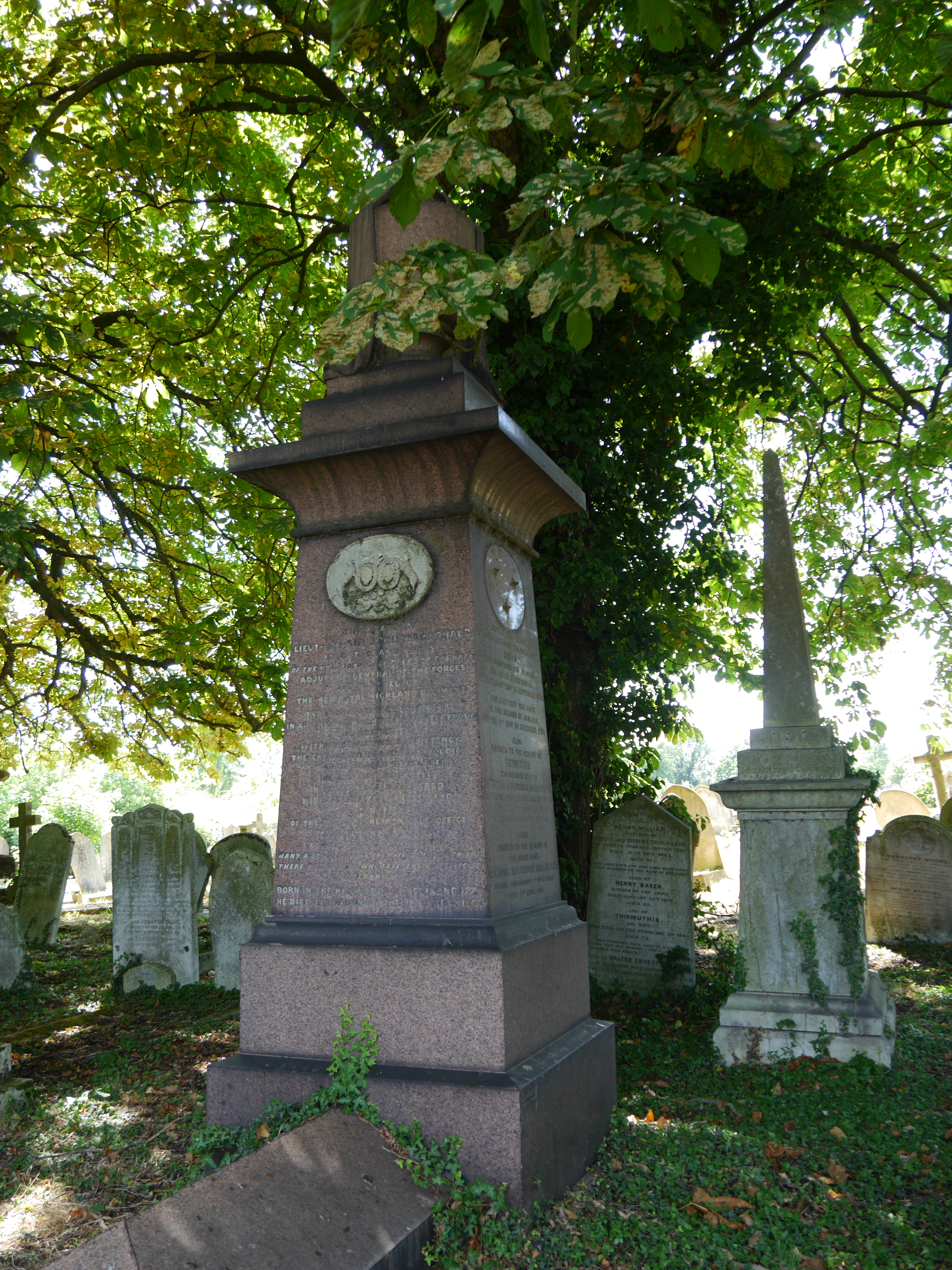
Monument, Kensal Green Cemetery

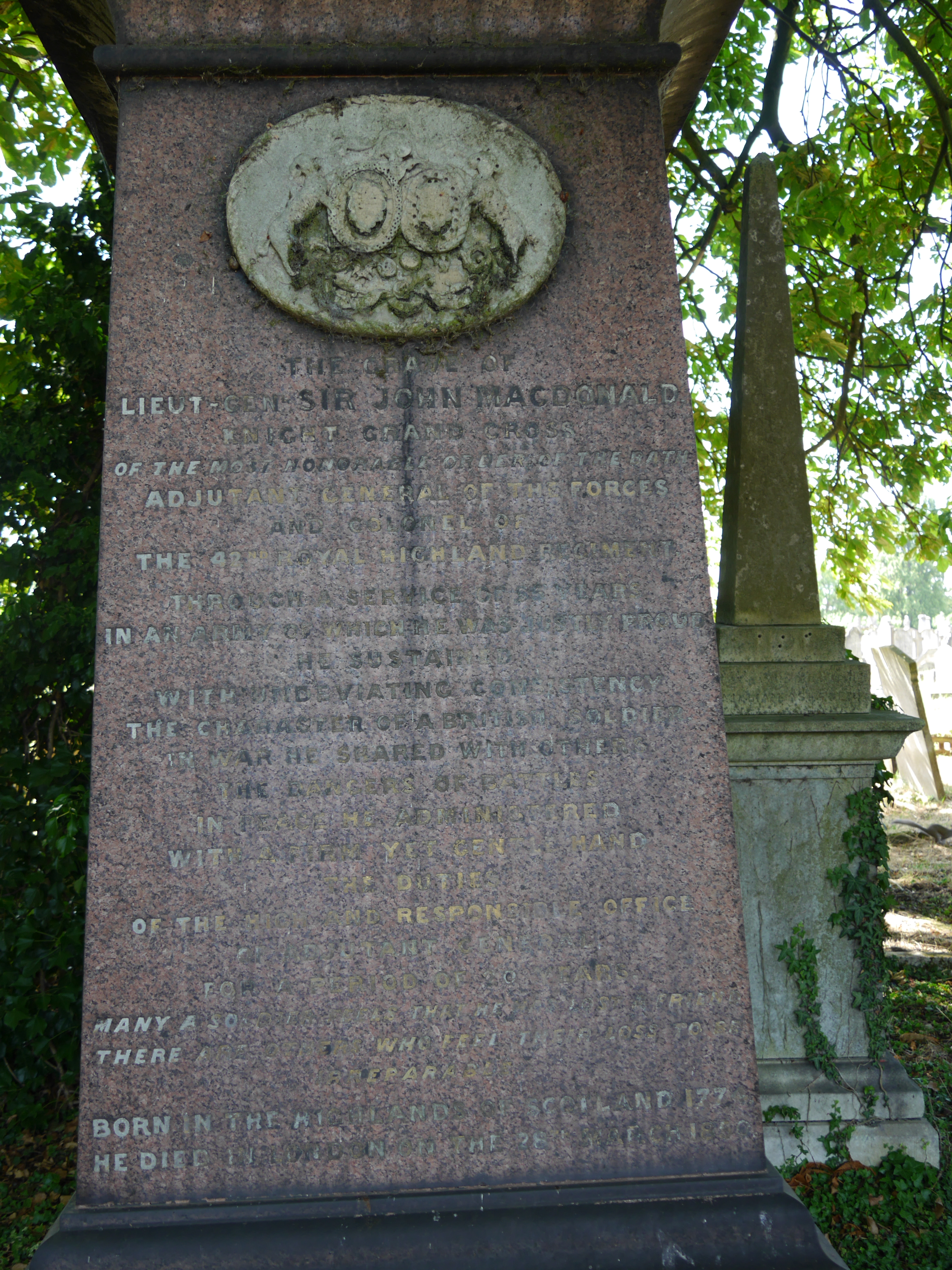
Monument detail, Kensal Green Cemetery

Lieutenant-General Sir John Macdonald GCB (before 1795 – 28 March 1850) was Adjutant-General to the Forces.

== Military career ==
John Macdonald was commissioned into the 89th Regiment of Foot on 15 April 1795. He became lieutenant the regiment 2 February 1796, and captain 22 October 1803. He was made a major-unattached 28 February 1805, lieutenant-colonel on half-pay of the 1st garrison battalion 17 March 1808, brevet colonel 4 June 1814, major-general 1825, and lieutenant-general 1838. He served with the 89th in the Irish Rebellion of 1798, and afterwards in Minorca, Heasina, and at the blockade of Malta and capture of Valletta in 1799–1800, and throughout the campaign in Egypt in 1801.

He was brigade-major to Sir William Cathcart, 1st Earl Cathcart in the home district in 1805, and military secretary when Cathcart was in command of the king's German legion as a separate army, in Swedish Pomerania (isle of Rugen), in 1806-7; and subsequently during the expedition to Copenhagenin in 1807. He was deputy adjutant-general to Sir John Hope, 4th Earl of Hopetoun at Walcheren; and held the same post with Lieutenant-general Thomas Graham, 1st Baron Lynedoch at Codii and at the battle of Barossa (gold medal). He was military secretary to Sir John Hope when commander-in-chief at Ireland in 1812.

He was a trusted aide to the Duke of Wellington. He rose to be Deputy Adjutant-General and then in July 1830 he was appointed Adjutant-General to the Forces. In this role he was conservative in his outlook and supported the Duke of Wellington in his efforts to retain flogging as a method of discipline.

Macdonald was appointed C.B. on 4 June 1815, K.C.B. in 1827, and G.C.B. in 1847.

He was also Colonel of the 67th Regiment of Foot in 1828, and then the 42nd Regiment of Foot on 16 March 1844.

He lived at 25 Pall Mall in London. He died at his residence, Bruton Street, London, 28 March 1850, and was buried at Kensal Green Cemetery.

== Family ==
He was a connection of Flora Macdonald the Jacobite heroine. He has a brother, Lieutenant-general Alexander Macdonald, royal artillery. Macdonald married a daughter of Charles Graham of Williamsfield, Jamaica, by whom he left children.

== Sources ==
- John Macdonald at Oxford Dictionary of National Biography

Military offices
Preceded by Sir William Keppel	Colonel of the 67th (the South Hampshire) Regiment of Foot; 1828–1844	Succeeded by John Clitheroe
Preceded by Sir Herbert Taylor	Adjutant General; 1830–1850	Succeeded by Sir George Brown
Preceded by Sir George Murray	Colonel of the 42nd (Royal Highland) Regiment of Foot; 1844–1850	Succeeded by Sir James Dawes Douglas
