= Henry Sclater =

British Army general

General Sir Henry Sclater GCB GBE
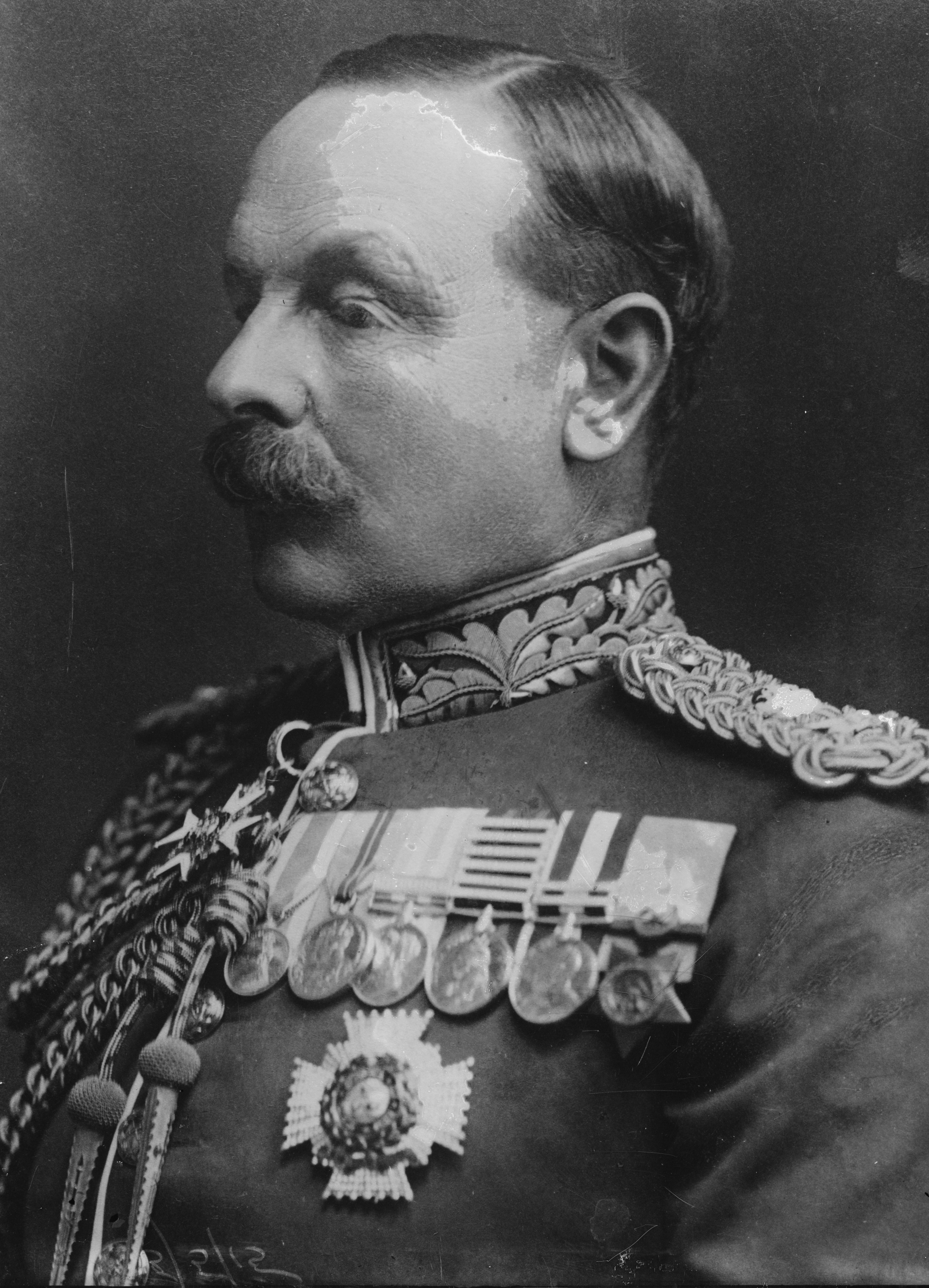
- Born: 5 November 1855
- Died: 26 September 1923 (aged 67)
- Spouse: Dame Edith Sclater
- Military career
- Allegiance: United Kingdom
- Branch: British Army
- Rank: General
- Commands: Southern Command
- Conflicts: Second Boer War; World War I
- Awards: Knight Grand Cross of the Order of the Bath; Knight Grand Cross of the Order of the British Empire

Sir Henry Crichton Sclater (5 November 1855 – 26 September 1923) was a British Army General during World War I.

== Military career ==
Henry Crichton Sclater, the third son of James Henry Sclater and Louisa Catherine Fowler, was born on 5 November 1855. After being educated at Cheltenham, he went to the Royal Military Academy and was commissioned in the Royal Artillery in 1875.

Sclater was a General Staff Officer and later Deputy Assistant Adjutant General at the Headquarters for the Nile expedition between 1884 and 1885. He was promoted to major on 15 June 1885, served in the Egyptian Frontier Field Force from 1885 to 1886 and was Deputy Assistant Adjutant General in Cairo from 1885 to 1890. Following his return to the United Kingdom, he was Brigade major of Royal Artillery, until in late 1899 he was reassigned following the outbreak of the Second Boer War.

He served as Assistant Adjutant General, Royal Artillery and Colonel on the General Staff of the Royal Artillery in South Africa (mentioned in despatches dated 31 March 1900). Following the end of the war, Lord Kitchener (Commander-in-Chief in South Africa) wrote in a despatch dated June 1902 how Sclater "possesses an unusual combination of ability and common sense. I consider him to be a Staff officer of exceptional value, to whom all ranks of the Royal Artillery in South Africa owe much." He returned home with the SS Kinfauns Castle leaving Cape Town in early August 1902, after the war had ended. In recognition of services during the war, he was appointed a Companion of the Order of the Bath (CB) in the South Africa honours list published on 26 June 1902, and he received the actual decoration from King Edward VII after his return, during an investiture at Buckingham Palace on 24 October 1902.

In September 1902, Sclater accompanied Lord Roberts, Commander-in-Chief of the Forces, and St John Brodrick, Secretary of State for War, on a visit to Germany to attend the German army maneuvers as guest of the Emperor Wilhelm. The following month, he was back as a regular regimental officer in the Royal Artillery, but in early November 1902 he was again appointed a staff officer as Deputy Director-General of Ordnance, with the substantive rank of colonel in the army. The Army Ordnance Department was responsible for supply of weapons and military equipment. He was Director of Artillery at the War Office from 1903 to 1904 when he became Quartermaster General for India. In 1908 he was appointed commander of Quetta Division in India.

On 23 June 1911 he was promoted to lieutenant general.

He served in World War I as Adjutant-General to the Forces, a role he took up in April 1914 in succession to Lieutenant General Sir Spencer Ewart and a Member of Army Council from 1914 to 1916: in this capacity he was responsible for the expansion of the Army in 1914. He served as general officer commanding-in-chief for Southern Command from March 1916, taking over from Lieutenant General William Pitcairn Campbell, to 1919, the year he was promoted to general, and retired from the army in 1922, dying the following year.

== Family ==
On 12 June 1884 Sclater married Edith Barttelot. They had no children.

== Death ==
Sclater died on 26 September 1923, and was survived by his wife, Dame Edith Sclater.

Military offices
Preceded by Sir Spencer Ewart	Adjutant General; 1914–1916	Succeeded by Sir Nevil Macready
Preceded by Sir William Campbell	GOC-in-C Southern Command; 1916–1919	Succeeded by Sir George Harper
