= William Keppel (British Army officer, died 1834) =

British Army general

General Sir William Keppel GCB
- Died: 11 December 1834
- Burial place: Paris
- Military career
- Allegiance: United Kingdom
- Branch: British Army
- Rank: General
- Awards: Knight Grand Cross of the Order of the Bath

General Sir William Keppel GCB (died 11 December 1834) was a British soldier and colonial administrator.

== Military career ==
He entered the army as an ensign in the 25th Regiment of Foot on 25 January 1777, and became a lieutenant in the 60th Regiment of Foot 4 March 1777. He subsequently served in the 23rd Regiment of Foot and the 15th Regiment of Foot the next year, the 82nd Regiment of Foot in 1782, and the 93rd Regiment of Foot in 1783. He was breveted colonel in 1794. On 20 May 1795, he was promoted colonel of the 3rd West India Regiment, which he commanded until 1806.

He was governor of Martinique 1796–1802. In 1803, he was promoted to lieutenant general. On 24 April 1806, he was appointed colonel of the King's Royal Rifle Corps until 7 February 1811, when he transferred as colonel to the 67th Regiment of Foot, which he commanded until 1828. He was promoted full General on 4 June 1813.

He became Governor of Portsmouth in 1826 and he was sworn of the Privy Council and appointed Governor of Guernsey in 1827. On 25 August 1828, he was appointed colonel of the 2nd (The Queen's Royal) Regiment of Foot.

He was a Groom of the Bedchamber and Equerry to King George IV of the United Kingdom from 1812 to 1830 (including the period 1812 to 1820 when the King acted as Prince Regent during his father's mental illness). He was knighted in 1813 and on 2 January 1815, made a Knight Grand Cross of the Order of the Bath

== Sources ==
- Cannon, Richard (1838). Historical Record of the Second, or Queen's Royal Regiment of Foot. London: Clowes and Sons.

Military offices
New regiment	Colonel of the 3rd West India Regiment; 1795–1806	Succeeded by Hildebrand Oakes
Preceded by William Gardiner	Colonel of the 1st Battalion, 60th Regiment of Foot; 1806–1811	Succeeded by Arthur Whetham
Preceded by Peter Craig	Colonel of the 67th (South Hampshire) Regiment of Foot; 1811–1828	Succeeded by John Macdonald
Preceded by The Earl Harcourt	Governor of Portsmouth; 1826–1827	Succeeded by The Duke of Gloucester and Edinburgh
Preceded by The Earl of Pembroke	Governor of Guernsey; 1827–1834	Succeeded by Abolished
Preceded by Sir Henry Torrens	Colonel of the 2nd (The Queen's Royal) Regiment of Foot; 1828–1834	Succeeded by Sir James Kempt
