= Nevil Macready =

British Army general (1862–1946)

General The Right Honourable Sir Nevil Macready Bt GCMG KCB
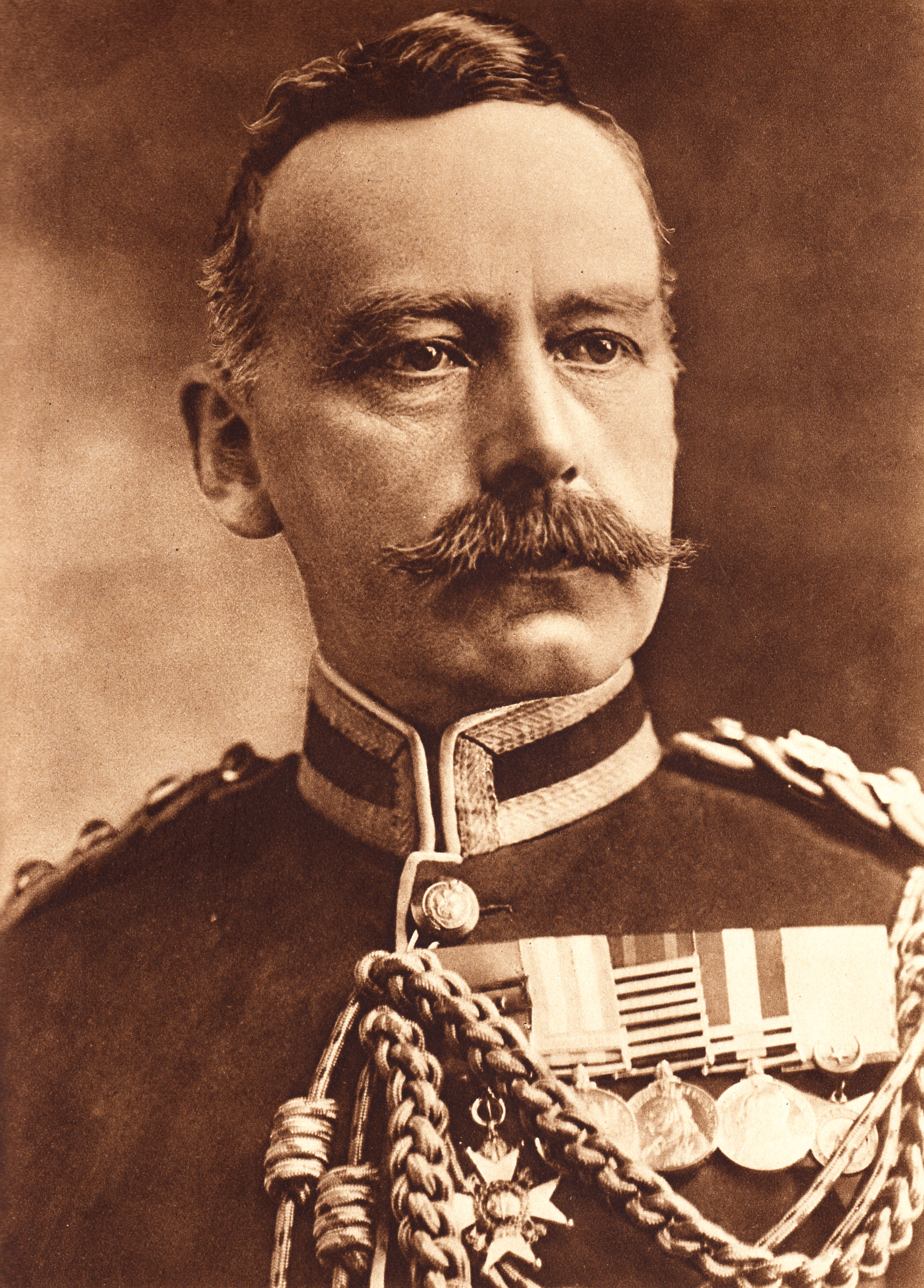
- Lieutenant-General Sir Nevil Macready, c. 1915
- Born: Cecil Frederick Nevil Macready; 7 May 1862; Cheltenham, Gloucestershire
- Died: 9 January 1946 (aged 83); Knightsbridge, London
- Children: Gordon
- Military career
- Allegiance: United Kingdom
- Branch: British Army
- Service years: 1881–1923
- Rank: General
- Nickname: Make-Ready
- Unit: Gordon Highlanders
- Commands: 2nd Infantry Brigade; Belfast District; Commander-in-Chief, Ireland
- Conflicts: Second Boer War; First World War; Anglo-Irish War
- Awards: Knight Grand Cross of the Order of St Michael and St George; Knight Commander of the Order of the Bath; Mentioned in Despatches (6)
- Education: Marlborough College
- Alma mater: Royal Military College, Sandhurst
- Father: William Macready
- Relatives: William Macready the Elder (paternal grandfather); Sir William Beechey (great-grandfather)

General Sir Cecil Frederick Nevil Macready, 1st Baronet, GCMG, KCB, PC (Ire) (7 May 1862 – 9 January 1946), known affectionately as Make-Ready (close to the correct pronunciation of his name), was a British Army officer. He served in senior staff appointments in the First World War and was the last British military commander in Ireland, and also served for two years as Commissioner of Police of the Metropolis in London.

== Early life ==
Macready was the son of the prominent actor William Charles Macready. His father was 69 years old at Nevil's birth. His paternal grandfather was William Macready the Elder (1755–1829), a famous Irish actor from Dublin. He was born in Cheltenham in May 1862 and was brought up in the bohemian circles frequented by his parents (his mother, Cecile, was the granddaughter of the painter, Sir William Beechey), and was educated at Marlborough College (for two years, before falling ill) and Cheltenham College. He later claimed that he was far too lazy to pursue an artistic career himself, and although he expressed an interest in a stage career, his father, who loathed his own profession, expressly forbade it (although he continued to be involved in amateur dramatics all his life and was also a talented singer). He therefore joined the British Army, passing out from the Royal Military College at Sandhurst, and being commissioned as a lieutenant into the Gordon Highlanders in October 1881.

== Regimental career ==
He joined the 1st Battalion, Gordon Highlanders at Malta, and in 1882 went with them to Egypt, fighting at the Battle of Tel el-Kebir, the last battle in which the British Army fought in red coats. He stayed in Egypt, and in 1884 was appointed garrison adjutant and staff lieutenant of military police at Alexandria. In 1886, he married Sophia Geraldine Atkin (died 1931), an Irishwoman; they had two daughters and a son. Macready remained in Alexandria until early 1889, when he returned to England to rejoin his regiment, and then served in Ceylon and India. Having been promoted to lieutenant in October 1889, he was promoted to captain in 1891. He was transferred to Dublin in 1892, and in 1894 became adjutant of the regiment's 2nd Volunteer Battalion in Aberdeenshire. In December 1899, he was promoted major and returned to India to join the 2nd Battalion, which was sent to South Africa in September.

=== Boer War and South Africa ===
Macready saw active service in the Second Boer War, serving in the besieged garrison at Ladysmith from October 1899 to February 1900. As a captain, returning from bringing in wounded, he first met Major-General John French on the battlefield of Elandslaagte, giving him a cup of coffee which he had looted from the Boers. He was mentioned in dispatches twice and promoted to the brevet rank of lieutenant-colonel in November 1900, and in June 1901 headed a commission investigating cattle-raiding in Zululand. He stayed in South Africa in a series of staff posts, including assistant provost marshal at Port Elizabeth (1901), deputy assistant adjutant-general (DAAG) of the district west of Johannesburg (December 1901 – 1902) (temporary appointment as assistant adjutant-general from October 1902), assistant adjutant general (AAG) and chief staff officer of Cape Colony (1903–1905), and assistant quartermaster-general (AQMG) of Cape Colony (1905–1906). He was promoted to colonel in November 1903. He was appointed Companion of the Order of the Bath (CB) in the 1906 Birthday Honours and returned to Britain in October of that year. He was then placed on a period of half-pay.

== War Office ==
In March 1907, Macready was appointed an assistant adjutant-general in the directorate of personal services at the War Office in London, taking over from Colonel Colin Mackenzie, and helped to form the Territorial Force (TF). He was then promoted to temporary brigadier general in August 1909 and succeeded Henry Rawlinson, 1st Baron Rawlinson in command of the 2nd Infantry Brigade at Aldershot. In June 1910 he returned to the War Office as director of personal services, responsible for a variety of personnel matters. Also having responsibility for military aid to the civil power, he played a large part in a series of labour disputes and in deploying troops to Ireland in anticipation of disturbances there. Unusually for an army officer of the time, he had marked liberal tendencies, believed in the right to strike, and supported Irish home rule. He was contemptuous of politics, socialism, communism, pacifism and capitalism (unless the employers treated their employees very well).

He was promoted major-general in October, and in November he took direct command of troops deployed to deal with a possible miners' strike, in the Rhondda Valley in South Wales, insisting that his troops remained subordinate both to the police and to the Home Office and not answerable to the panicking local magistrates. This policy probably helped to avert serious unrest in 1910 and again in a similar situation in 1912. A civil CB was added to his military CB in 1911 and, in June 1912 he was appointed Knight Commander of the Order of the Bath (KCB). After the Curragh incident in Ireland in March 1914, Macready was made general officer commanding (GOC) Belfast District and was nominated as military governor-designate of Belfast in the event of civil war breaking out, something averted by the outbreak of the First World War in August 1914.

== First World War, Ireland and Adjutant-General ==
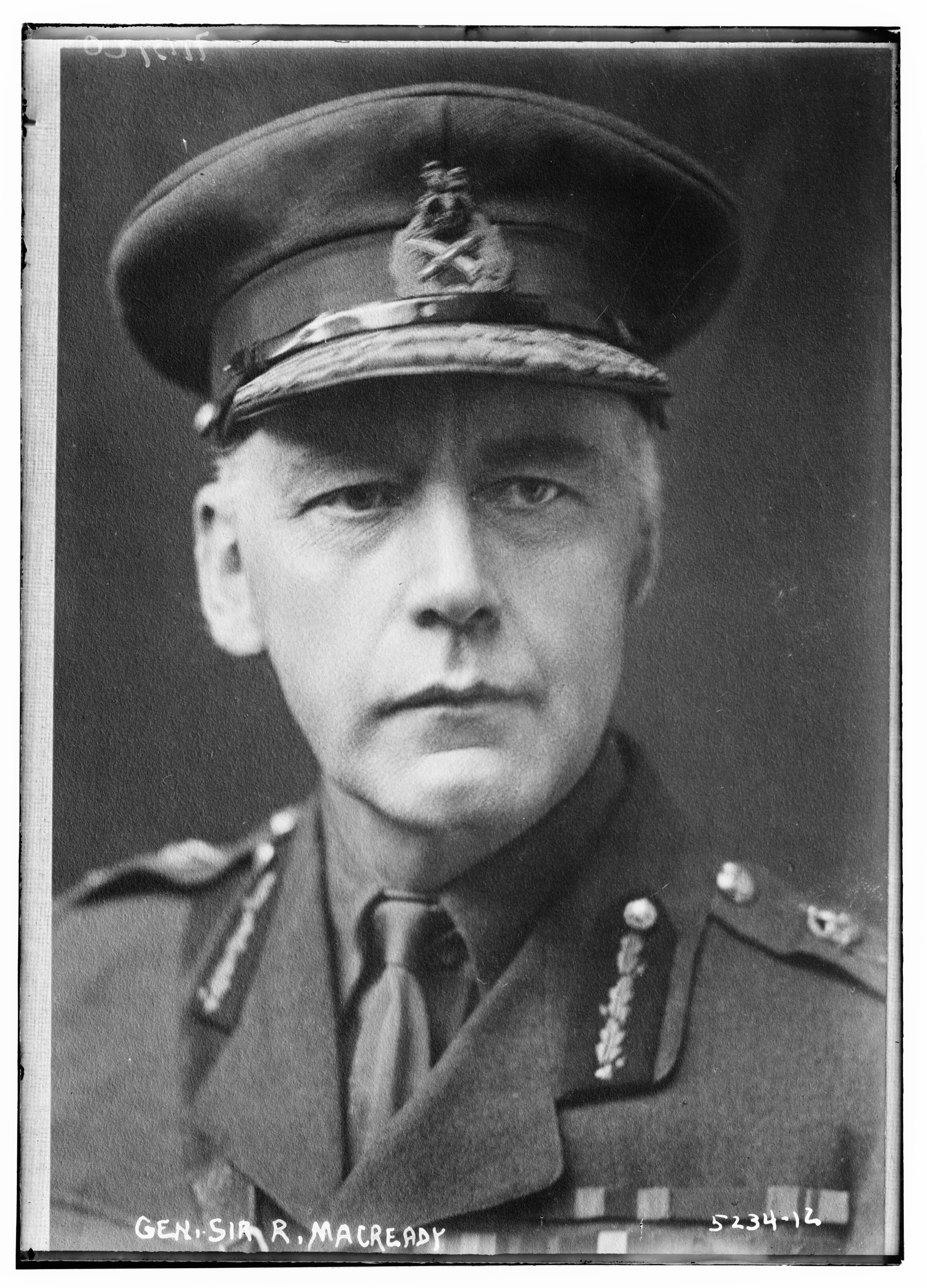
Macready in 1916.

On the outbreak of war in August 1914, Macready was immediately sent to France as Adjutant-General of the British Expeditionary Force (BEF). He was promoted to temporary lieutenant-general on 13 September. In June 1915, he was appointed Knight Commander of the Order of St Michael and St George (KCMG) in the 1915 Birthday Honours.

In February 1916, having carried out this job efficiently, he was recalled to London as Adjutant-General to the Forces, one of the most senior staff appointments in the British Army.

In December 1915, Macready was warned by Special Branch of the impending violence and Irish nationalist volunteer recruitment in Ireland, and from March 1916 was receiving warnings from daily police reports. At the War Office, civil servants as late as 10 April 1916, still believed there was no cause for concern in Ireland:

"I do not believe leaders mean insurrection," wrote Sir Matthew Nathan, "or that the Volunteers have sufficient arms to make it formidable if the leaders do mean it."

Macready failed to understand the intentions of the nationalist leaders.

Macready advised General Maxwell (whose courts-martial sentenced several of the Easter Rising's leaders to be executed) not to delay, and not to be afraid of overstepping authority. He was promoted lieutenant-general in June 1916 (although he was already temporarily in that rank).

Macready was an enthusiastic proponent of the employment of female labour to free men to go to the front. He also abolished the compulsory maintenance of moustaches by the Army's officers and other ranks, and immediately shaved off his own, which he had hated.

On 8th October, 1916, the order allowing all ranks to grow or not to grow moustaches according to their fancy was signed... I dropped into a barber's shop and set the example that evening, as I was only too glad to be rid of the unsightly bristles to which I had for many years been condemned by obedience to regulations.

During the final stages of the Battle of Passchendaele, Macready warned (4 October 1917) that the BEF could be kept up to strength if it suffered no more than a further 50,000 casualties before the end of the year, but the total exceeded this. The BEF suffered an alarming rise in drunkenness, desertions and psychological disorders; reports were gathered of soldiers returning from the front grumbling about "the waste of life" at Ypres.

In September 1918 Macready was promoted full general and appointed Knight Grand Cross of the Order of St Michael and St George (GCMG). He had been mentioned in despatches four times during the war, been made a Grand Officier of the Légion d'honneur of France (1915), and a member of the Order of the Crown of Belgium, the Order of the Crown of Italy, and the Order of the Sacred Treasures of Japan.

== Commissioner of Police ==
In August 1918, Macready somewhat reluctantly took the post of Commissioner of Police of the Metropolis, head of the London Metropolitan Police, to which Prime Minister Asquith had intended to appoint him before war broke out in 1914. Morale was low, and many men were currently on strike over pay and trade union recognition. Macready got them back to work by granting a pay rise and promising the introduction of machinery for collective bargaining. He was popular among the constables and sergeants, whom he got to know far more than his predecessors had done. He abolished the system of punishment by deducting fines from men's pay over a period of months or even years. He also abolished the shilling a day deduction made from the pay of men on sick leave. He had an intense dislike of trade unions, and never took the short-lived National Union of Police and Prison Officers seriously, which partly led to the strike of 1919. Only a small percentage of the men went out on strike, and they were all dismissed, although Macready wrote a good reference for every one who asked.

== Ireland ==
=== Administration of justice and reform of the police ===
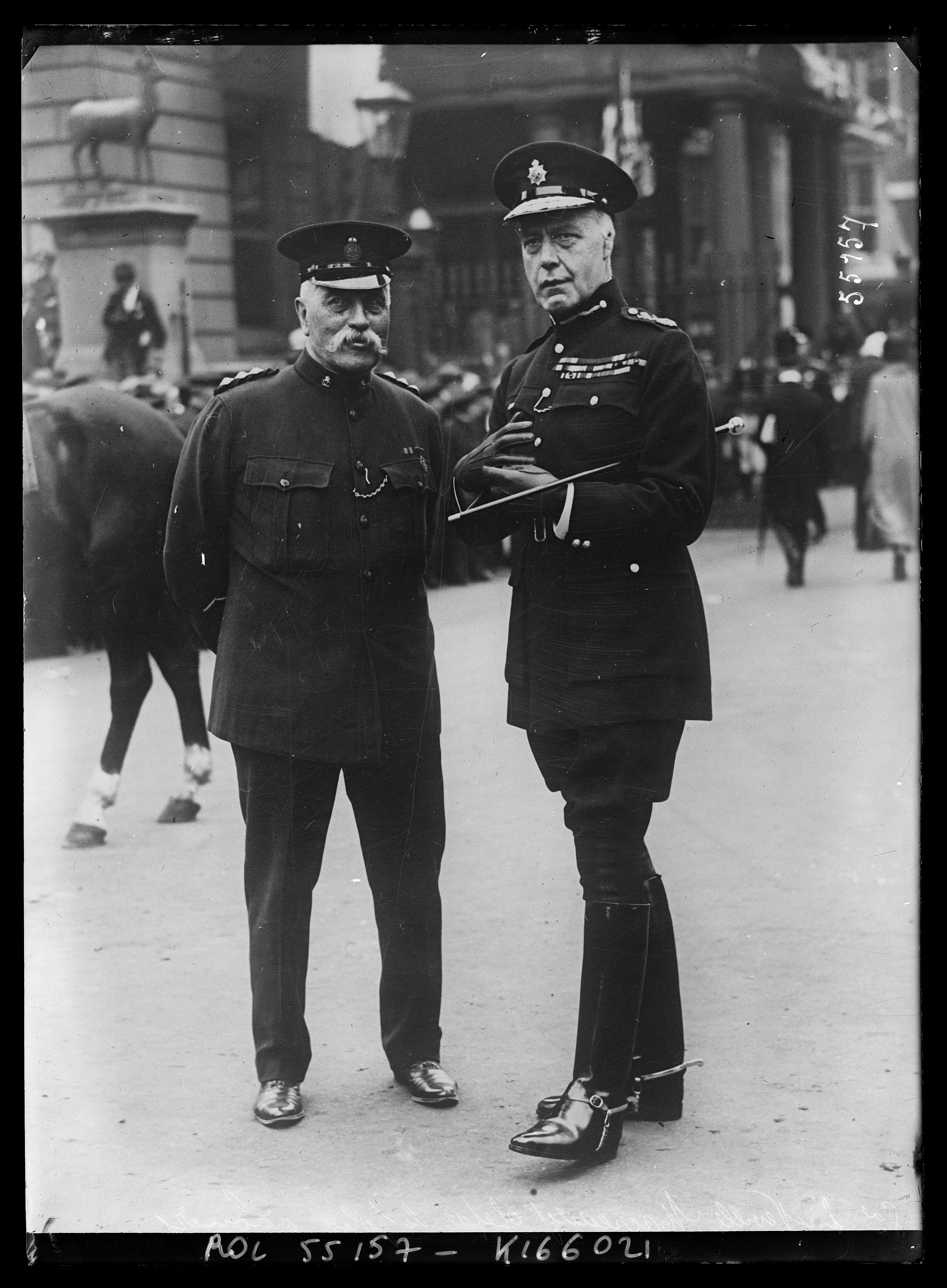
General Sir Nevil Macready in 1919.

Macready disliked Ireland and the Irish. He had already written to Ian Macpherson on the latter's appointment as Chief Secretary for Ireland in January 1919: "I cannot say I envy you for I loathe the country you are going to and its people with a depth deeper than the sea and more violent than that which I feel against the Boche".

In April 1920, Macready was sent to succeed Lieutenant-General Sir Frederick Shaw in command of the troops in Ireland as General Officer Commanding-in-Chief (GOC-in-C) British forces operating in the counter-insurgency role against the Irish Republican Army in the Irish War of Independence (alongside Hamar Greenwood as the new Chief Secretary). He later stated in his memoirs that only loyalty to his "old Chief" Lord French (still lord lieutenant of Ireland at the time, although largely stripped of executive power in the spring of 1920) made him accept.

Macready and Greenwood insisted on restoring proper authority, which was lax and enfeebled. Macready was experienced at crisis management. He demanded a higher pension than his predecessor and an increase in "table money" (entertainment expenses) from £500 to £1,400 as well as £5,000 "disturbance allowance". He was unimpressed by the administrative chaos in Dublin and the "crass stupidity which is so often found among police officers who have not been carefully selected". Nevertheless, he was a good and dynamic commander, increasing morale, improving policy and securing additional troops and equipment. He refused to also take command of the Royal Irish Constabulary (RIC), however, which reduced coordination between the police and Army. Major-General Hugh Tudor, a distinguished artilleryman, was appointed Police Advisor in May 1920, then Chief of Police in November 1920.

A month after taking up official duties, Macready came to London to demand eight extra battalions of infantry and 234 motor vehicles. Sir Henry Wilson only learned of the request the evening before the Cabinet meeting and thought Macready "a vain ass" for not seeking his advice first. The cabinet agreed on 11 May 1920 to supply the vehicles and as far as possible the extra technical personnel requested, but on Wilson's advice agreed only to hold the extra battalions "in readiness". In July an argument with Catholic Archbishop Thomas Gilmartin, led him to exclaim that men could not be tried in Tuam, because nobody was willing to come forward for Jury service, "the people at least indifferent".

With the army stretched very thinly by the deployment of two extra divisions to Iraq, and the threatened coal strike in September 1920, Macready warned that the planned withdrawal of ten battalions would make peacekeeping in Ireland impossible (unless the Army was given a free hand to conduct purely military operations, which the politicians did not want) and large portions of the RIC would probably change sides.

=== Specials, Black and Tans and reprisals ===
Macready opposed the formation of the Ulster Special Constabulary, announced by London on 20 October. The Specials were subsumed totally by Protestants clubs, such as the Cromwell Clubs. Dublin Castle wrote to Bonar Law, the Conservative Party leader, urging that the coalition government ban any recruitment from the Ulster Volunteer Force, an unreliable gang of paramilitaries. A military committee of review appointed by the Cabinet, which Macready chaired, opposed the recruitment of the Black and Tans and Auxiliary Division, and he continued to be a strident critic of these bodies. The government pressed ahead with recruiting auxiliaries, whose numbers would eventually peak at 1,500 in July 1921. Macready had been initially impressed by Tudor and thought he was getting rid of "incompetent idiots" from senior police positions. According to Tudor's Weekly Summary Joseph Byrne and Macready were concerned about frequently drunk on duty policemen.

Macready and Wilson became increasingly concerned that Tudor, with the connivance of Lloyd George, who loved to drop hints to that effect, was operating an unofficial policy of killing IRA men in reprisal for the deaths of pro-Crown forces. However, Macready also told Wilson that the Army was arranging "accidents" for suspected IRA men, but did not tell the politicians as he did not want them "talked and joked about after dinner by Cabinet Ministers". Commenting on official reprisals, Macready stated that such actions "must have a deterrent effect on those who may be detailed for future outrages." In December 1920 Macready informed the British Cabinet that the Military Governors of the martial law areas had been authorized to conduct reprisals. From December 1920 until June 1921 approximately 150 "official" reprisals were carried out.

The new "Auxies" were following the bad example set by the local Irish police, the RIC, who had begun a process of reprisal killings for IRA attacks, which gave Macready considerable cause for concern."the RIC are not out of hand but are systematically left to reprise their officers." In Macready's view, shooting of suspects and dumping of bodies in the Liffey represented unavoidable "reprisals" for the death of a policeman. By 28 August, Macready knew that civil war was inevitable; as a consequence he would not tell the victims of the Lismore bombings not to resist. He was worried that release of political prisoners would anger the police; hanging became a matter of credibility. He rejected calls to spare the life of a young medical student, Kevin Barry, caught red-handed in the murders of several soldiers as young or younger than Barry was, in Dublin. Macready recruited Major Ormonde Winter, an intelligence expert, as head of police detectives, to train sergeants to build networks; but it was probably too slow a decision, and too little too late to win the war. The Barry case was thoroughly investigated at Macroom Station by Lt Crake of C company, of whom Macready thought well.

=== Martial law ===
Macready came to support martial law as he was worried that army and police discipline might otherwise collapse. "They are hopelessly out of date", he warned "We are sitting on a volcano. If they were turned into an unarmed police force they would fulfill their functions in time of peace a good deal better than at present", he told Sir John Anderson. He advised that ad hoc reprisals by the Black and Tans were not stopping the "murders". After the killing of sixteen Black and Tans in an ambush at Macroom, County Cork, martial law was declared on 10 December 1920 in the four Munster counties of Cork, Tipperary, Kerry and Limerick. Three days later Auxiliary Cadet Peter Harte opened fire while on patrol at a young man and an old priest, killing them both. Lloyd George was furious, calling for courts-martial and death by firing squad but Macready stalled for time, and delayed justice, so that Harte eventually received a proper trial and was found guilty but insane. Mark Sturgis was angry because in the west, Sinn Féin was still very strong, so that the policy of shoot-to-kill was not working. In mid-June 1921, the British government's Irish Situation Committee met to discuss a paper Macready had written. Macready argued that half-hearted coercion would not succeed and that "It must be all out or another policy." He also recommended that the Irish leaders Éamon de Valera, Arthur Griffith and Erskine Childers be tried for treason.

On 23 December 1920, Irish Home Rule became law. Macready attended a special conference on 29 December along with Wilson, Tudor and Sir John Anderson, head of the Civil Service in Dublin, at which they all advised that no truce should be allowed for elections to the planned Dublin Parliament, and that at least four months of martial law would be required to "break the Terror". The date for the elections was therefore set for May 1921. In accordance with Wilson and Macready's wishes, martial law was extended over the rest of Munster (Counties Waterford and Clare) and part of Leinster (Counties Kilkenny and Wexford). Macready felt under a great deal of pressure. The officer class were not prepared and contemptuous of the enemy's intelligence network; they did not take the need to adapt to gathering seriously.

=== The Anglo-Irish Treaty leads to civil war ===
By 1921, Macready had lost confidence in Tudor and thought the RIC had become unreliable. Macready was adamant that military jurisdiction in the Martial Law Area (MLA) trumped the civil courts. In a number of civil rights cases King's Bench writs were issued to reclaim bodies and damages but Macready dismissed the conflict in actions, as an "anomaly". As the violence escalated he had suspended civilian jurisdictions by Proclamation in April.

The Irish War of Independence reached a climax in the first half of 1921, with deaths of pro-Crown forces running at approximately double the rate of those in the second half of 1920 but with the IRA running desperately short of funds and ammunition and later described by one of its leaders Michael Collins as "dead beat" and within "six weeks of defeat". Macready backed a policy of "deterrent effects" against the IRA; houses were ordered to be destroyed, tenants evicted to remove those who shot at patrols. The British were slowly getting the upper hand.

In April 1921, the cabinet decided to withdraw four of Macready's 51 battalions to meet the possible Triple Alliance strike. Macready believed Ireland could be suppressed in the summer of 1921 with the elections out of the way, not least as troops would otherwise need to be replaced after the strain of guerrilla war. In May 1921, Lloyd George announced a surge of manpower; but Macready was concerned about low morale, and lack of specific training. An extra seventeen battalions were sent in June and July, bringing British strength up to 60,000, but the politicians drew back from the brink and opened secret talks with James Craig and Éamon de Valera (who had been born in New York of Spanish descent and whom Macready called Wilson's "Cuban Jew compatriot"). The policy of Official Reprisals proved counter-productive and was abandoned on 3 June 1921. Macready had no answer to the attacks on soft Unionist targets.

Macready was instrumental in negotiating the truce in July 1921, although he suggested, perhaps in jest, that the entire Irish Dáil could be arrested whilst in session. He suffered the irritation of being found in contempt of court for refusing to obey an order of habeas corpus in the Joseph Egan case; but the Truce rendered the matter academic. Following the Anglo-Irish Treaty and creation of the Irish Free State in 1922, he withdrew the troops without great incident before the onset of the Irish Civil War.

=== Possible role in the Civil War ===
It has been suggested that Collins had a hand in the assassination of Sir Henry Wilson. This has never been confirmed. Wilson was shot dead at the doorstep of his London home by two Irishmen, former British Army soldiers who had served in the Great War. The two were quickly captured and hanged. The murder precipitated a policy of "Official Reprisals", sparked by Rory O'Connor's anti-Treaty IRA occupation of the Four Courts, home of the Provisional Government's ministry. From 22 June 1922 there were six Cabinet meetings in 72 hours.

They concluded that the Four Courts was a centre of "seditious activity". On 24 June the Cabinet ordered an assault for 25 June, to be carried out by the Army. Macready, commander-in-chief, was in disagreement; Macready argued that escalation of violence would only unite the two factions of IRA and alienate the moderates. London pressed Dublin to use the Free State Army to end the occupation of the Four Courts, giving an ultimatum for the rebels to leave on 28 June. In the event it was agreed with Richard Mulcahy that they should receive two 18-pounder field guns. These were used to pound the Four Courts garrison into surrender but they missed; the officers were so inexperienced that Emmet Dalton, the Chief of Staff required artillery training from Macready's men. Macready retired on 1 March 1923 and was created a baronet. He had been sworn of the Privy Council of Ireland in 1920.

== Later life ==
In 1924, he published his two-volume memoirs, of an Active Life. Macready destroyed his own diaries and private papers after completing his memoirs, but 400 letters between Wilson and Macready survive, only ten of which predate his Irish appointment.

He briefly returned to police service during the 1926 General Strike, when he served as a staff officer to the Chief Commandant of the Metropolitan Special Constabulary.

== Death ==
He died at his home in Knightsbridge, London, in 1946, aged 83. His son, Lieutenant-General Sir Gordon Macready (1891–1956), was also a distinguished soldier and inherited the baronetcy on his father's death.

== In film ==
His character appears very briefly in the film Michael Collins (1996); he is played by Alan Stanford.

== Styles ==
- 1862–1881: Cecil Frederick Nevil Macready
- 1881–1891: Lieutenant Cecil Frederick Nevil Macready
- 1891–1899: Captain Cecil Frederick Nevil Macready
- 1899–1900: Major Cecil Frederick Nevil Macready
- 1900–1903: Lieutenant-Colonel Cecil Frederick Nevil Macready
- 1903–1906: Colonel Cecil Frederick Nevil Macready
- 1906–1910: Colonel Cecil Frederick Nevil Macready, CB
- 1910–1912: Major-General Cecil Frederick Nevil Macready, CB
- 1912–1915: Major-General Sir Cecil Frederick Nevil Macready, KCB
- 1915–1916: Major-General Sir Cecil Frederick Nevil Macready, KCB, KCMG
- 1916–1918: Lieutenant-General Sir Cecil Frederick Nevil Macready, KCB, KCMG
- 1918–1920: General Sir Cecil Frederick Nevil Macready, GCMG, KCB
- 1920–1923: General The Rt Hon Sir Cecil Frederick Nevil Macready, GCMG, KCB
- 1923–1946: General The Rt Hon Sir Cecil Frederick Nevil Macready, Bt, GCMG, KCB

== Coat of arms ==
Coat of arms of Nevil Macready
Crest On a wreath of the colours in front of two swords points upwards in saltire proper pommels and hilts Or a cubit arm also Proper grasping a snake Vert. Escutcheon Argent on a chevron Azure between three leopard faces Gules two swords the points in saltire Proper pommels and hilts Or. Motto Latin: Ad Extremum Tenax English: Unmoved to the end

== Footnotes ==
Military offices
Preceded by George Browne	Director of Personal Services, War Office; 1910–1914	Succeeded by ?
Preceded by Sir Henry Sclater	Adjutant-General to the Forces; 1916–1918	Succeeded by Sir George Macdonogh
Preceded by Sir Frederick Shaw	General Officer Commanding-in-Chief Ireland; 1920–1922	Office abolished
Police appointments
Preceded by Sir Edward Henry	Commissioner of Police of the Metropolis; 1918–1920	Succeeded by William Horwood
Baronetage of the United Kingdom
New creation	Baronet (of Cheltenham); 1923–1946	Succeeded by Gordon Nevil Macready
