= John Davis (British Army officer) =

Major-General Sir John Davis KCB
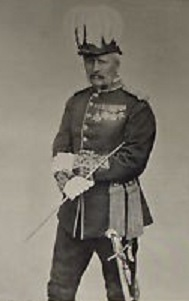
- Born: 27 April 1832; County Dublin, Ireland
- Died: 5 October 1901 (aged 69); Shean, Ballycroy, County Mayo
- Military career
- Allegiance: United Kingdom
- Branch: British Army
- Service years: 1852–1898
- Rank: Major-General
- Commands: 1st Infantry Brigade at Malta; Dublin District; Southern District
- Conflicts: Indian Rebellion; Mahdist War
- Awards: Knight Commander of the Order of the Bath

Major-General Sir John Davis KCB (27 April 1832 – 5 October 1901) was an Irish officer in the British Army who became General Officer Commanding the Southern District.

== Early life and education ==
Davis was the son of John Davis, of the Park, Rathfarnham, County Dublin, and his wife, Martha. He was baptised at St Andrew's Catholic Church. He was educated at Cheltenham College.

== Military career ==
Davis was commissioned as an ensign in the 35th (Royal Sussex) Regiment of Foot in 1852 and saw action during the Indian Rebellion in 1857. He was present at the First and Second Battles of El Teb in February 1884 and commanded the 2nd Brigade at the Battle of Tamai in March 1884 during the Mahdist War. He became Commander of the troops at Malta in 1884, Commander of the 1st Infantry Brigade at Malta in April 1886 and General Officer Commanding Dublin District in January 1888. He went on to be General Officer Commanding the Southern District, at Portsmouth, in November 1893 before retiring in November 1898.

He was appointed Honorary Colonel of the 3rd (Hampshire Militia) Battalion, Hampshire Regiment, on 26 February 1896, and in 1900 he was given the Colonelcy of the Royal Sussex Regiment, which he held until his death the following year.

== Sources ==
- Raugh, Harold (2004). The Victorians at War, 1815-1914: An Encyclopedia of British Military History. ABC-Clio. ISBN 978-1576079256.

Military offices
Preceded by The Duke of Connaught and Strathearn	GOC Southern District; 1893–1898	Succeeded by Sir Baker Russell
