= Baker Russell =

British Army officer (1837–1911)

General Sir Baker Russell GCB KCMG
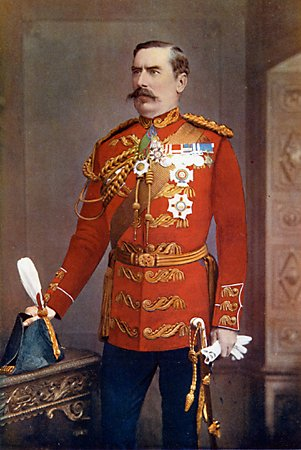
- Born: 11 January 1837; Maitland, NSW, Australia
- Died: 25 November 1911 (aged 74); Folkestone, Kent, UK
- Military career
- Allegiance: United Kingdom
- Branch: British Army
- Service years: 1854–1911
- Rank: General
- Unit: 13th Hussars
- Commands: Aldershot Cavalry Brigade; North Western District; Bengal Command; Southern District
- Conflicts: Indian Mutiny; Anglo-Ashanti War; Anglo-Zulu War; Egyptian War; Sekhukhune Wars
- Awards: Knight Grand Cross of the Order of the Bath; Knight Commander of the Order of St Michael and St George

General Sir Baker Creed Russell GCB KCMG (11 January 1837 – 25 November 1911) was an Australian-born British Army officer who served with distinction in the Indian Mutiny, Anglo-Ashanti War, Anglo-Zulu War, Sekhukhune Wars, and Egyptian War.

== Early life ==
Baker Creed Russell was born in 1837 at Ravensworth, Maitland, New South Wales, Australia, the son of the Hon. William Russell, of the New South Wales Legislative Council, formerly a captain in the 73rd Regiment.

== Military career ==
Russell entered the British Army in 1855 as a cornet of the Carabiniers. Promoted to lieutenant on 1 August 1856, he was present at Meerut during the Indian Mutiny and took part in the pursuit of the Tantya Tope. He was promoted to captain on 18 February 1859. He was transferred to the 13th Hussars in 1862 and subsequently commanded that regiment. Promoted to brevet major on 24 January 1865, he accompanied Sir Garnet Wolseley to the Gold Coast during the first Ashanti Expedition in 1873.

Promoted to the substantive rank of major on 15 July 1878, he again served under Wolseley, this time in the Zulu campaign in 1879. For his successful leadership of the operations against Sekukuni, he was appointed a KCMG and aide-de-camp to Queen Victoria. He was a member of the Wolseley ring and was promoted to lieutenant colonel on 29 September 1880.

He commanded the 1st Cavalry Brigade during the Egyptian War in 1882. He led the midnight charge at Kassassin, was present at the battle of Tel el-Kebir and took part in the march to and occupation of Cairo.

He was, for a short time, Inspecting Officer of Auxiliary Cavalry in 1886. Promoted to major-general on 1 April 1889, he became General Officer Commanding the Aldershot Cavalry Brigade in 1890, General Officer Commanding the North Western District, which had its headquarters in Chester, in 1895 and Commander-in-Chief Bengal Command in 1896. Promoted to lieutenant general on 20 January 1897, he went on to be General Officer Commanding Southern District, based in Portsmouth, in 1898. In this capacity he was very conspicuous at Southampton Docks whenever troops were embarking for South Africa in the early stages of the Anglo-Boer War.

He died on 25 November 1911 in Folkestone, Kent.

== Additional information ==
- Oxford Dictionary of National Biography
- Journals of Brigadier General Clarke's column and Colonel Baker-Russell's column, 26 July-17 Aug

Military offices
Preceded by Julian Hall	GOC North Western District; 1895–1896	Succeeded by Leopold Swaine
Preceded by Sir William Elles	C-in-C, Bengal Command; 1896–1898	Succeeded by Sir George Luck
Preceded by Sir John Davis	GOC Southern District; 1898–1903	Succeeded by Robert Montgomery
