= Arthur Whetham =

British Army general

Major-General Arthur Whetham
- Born: c. 1783
- Died: 13 May 1853
- Military career
- Allegiance: United Kingdom
- Branch: British Army
- Rank: Major-General
- Conflicts: French Revolutionary Wars; Napoleonic Wars

Major-General Arthur Whetham (c. 1783 – 13 May 1853) was a British Army officer who became Lieutenant-Governor of Portsmouth.

== Family and early life ==
Arthur Whetham was born in 1783 (Note: He was aged 70 when he died, 70 years before 1853 was 1783) the son of John Whetham.

It is known that he was a descendant of Colonel Nathaniel Whetham, and Arthur was a brother of a different Colonel John Whetham, an officer in the 12th Regiment of Foot, who died during a Siege of Gibraltar.

There was also a cousin of his named Lieutenant General Arthur Whetham (1753-1813), who was the Governor of Portsmouth.

His great uncle, Thomas Whetham, was also a general who commanded the 12th Regiment of Foot from 1725 to 1741.

== Military career ==
Whetham was commissioned as a lieutenant in the 40th Regiment of Foot in 1799. He took part in the Anglo-Russian invasion of Holland in 1799 and was wounded at the Battle of Montevideo in February 1807 during the British invasions of the River Plate. He became Lieutenant-Governor of Portsmouth and General Officer Commanding South-West District in January 1808. He was also colonel of the 60th Regiment of Foot.

He died on 13 May 1853. (Note: His obituary is in the 1853 deaths section, though it is never explicitly specified what year he passed. It is very clearly written at the beginning of it that he died on 13 May, though)

== Notes ==
Military offices
Preceded by Sir George Prevost	GOC South-West District; 1808–1813	Succeeded by Thomas Maitland
