= Curragh incident =

1914 threatened British mutiny in Ireland

The Curragh incident of 20 March 1914, sometimes known as the Curragh mutiny, occurred in the Curragh, County Kildare, Ireland. The Curragh Camp was then the main base for the British Army in Ireland, which at the time still formed part of the United Kingdom of Great Britain and Ireland. Ireland was scheduled to receive a measure of devolved government, which would include the northern province of Ulster, later in the year. The incident is important in 20th-century Irish history and is notable for being one of the few occasions since the English Civil War in which elements of the British military openly intervened in politics. It is widely thought of as a mutiny, though no orders actually given were disobeyed.

With Irish Home Rule due to become law in 1914, the British Cabinet contemplated some kind of military action against the unionist Ulster Volunteers who threatened to rebel against it. Many officers, especially those with Irish Protestant connections, of whom the most prominent was Hubert Gough, threatened to resign or accept dismissal rather than obey orders to conduct military operations against the unionists, and were privately encouraged from London by senior officers including the Director of Military Operations Sir Henry Wilson.

Although the Cabinet issued a document claiming that the issue had been a misunderstanding, Secretary of State for War J. E. B. Seely and Chief of the Imperial General Staff (CIGS) Field Marshal Sir John French were forced to resign after amending it to promise that the British Army would not be used against the Ulster loyalists. The event contributed both to unionist confidence and to the growing Irish nationalist movement.

== Background ==
In early 1912, the Liberal British government of H. H. Asquith had introduced the Third Home Rule Bill for Ireland, which proposed the creation of an autonomous Irish Parliament in Dublin. Unionists had objected to being under the jurisdiction of the proposed Dublin Parliament, and Ulster Unionists founded the Ulster Volunteers (UVF) paramilitary group in 1912, aided by a number of senior retired British officers, to fight if necessary against the British government and/or against a future Irish Home Rule government as proposed by the bill.

In September 1913, the Chief of the Imperial General Staff (CIGS), John French, had expressed his concerns to the government and to the King (who had also asked Asquith for his views) that the British Army, if ordered to act against the UVF, might split, with some serving officers even siding with the Ulster Unionists, given that many shared the same view of preserving and defending a Protestant British Empire and believed Home Rule for mainly Catholic Ireland would threaten it. Major-General Henry Wilson, was in regular contact with Opposition leaders (including Bonar Law) and with retired officers who supported the Volunteers.

== Paget's orders ==
To deal with the threat of violence from the UVF should the Home Rule Bill be passed in the British Parliament, Chief of the General Staff (CIGS) Field Marshal Sir John French and Secretary of State for War J. E. B. Seely summoned General Sir Arthur Paget, Commander-in-Chief in Ireland, for talks at the War Office in October 1913. Paget's letter (19 October) suggests that he wanted "partial mobilisation" while Seely wrote to the Prime Minister (24 October) about the potential use of General Nevil Macready, who had experience of crowd control during the Tonypandy riots in 1910, and had been consulted by Augustine Birrell (Chief Secretary for Ireland) about the use of troops in the Belfast riots of 1912. In October 1913, Seely sent Macready to report on the police in Belfast and Dublin.

Intelligence reported that the UVF (now 100,000 strong) might be about to seize the ammunition at Carrickfergus Castle. Political negotiations were deadlocked as John Redmond's Irish Parliamentary Party was only willing to offer Ulster an opt-out from Home Rule for up to six years (i.e., until after the next general election), whereas the Ulster Unionists, led by Edward Carson, wanted a permanent opt-out. Asquith set up a five-man Cabinet Committee, chaired by Lord Crewe (who soon fell ill), and consisting of John Simon, Augustine Birrell, Seely, and Winston Churchill (First Lord of the Admiralty). Churchill, who spoke at Bradford (14 March) to say that there were "worse things than bloodshed, even on an extended scale" and "Let us go forward together and put these grave matters to the proof", and Seely appear to have been courting some kind of confrontation with the UVF.

Paget was ordered to prepare to deploy troops to prevent "evil-disposed persons" seizing weapons, and summoned to London for further instructions. Seely obtained French's compliance by repeatedly assuring him of the accuracy of intelligence that the UVF might march on Dublin. The plan was to occupy government buildings, to repel any assaults by the UVF and to guard the armouries at Omagh, Enniskillen, Armagh, Dundalk and Carrickfergus to prevent thefts of weapons. Six different contingencies were discussed, including armed resistance to the troops as they moved to protect the arms depots. Seely also promised Paget reinforcements "... to the last man ..." to uphold the law in Ireland. In the event of a railway strike, or other obstacle, Churchill offered transport of forces by the Royal Navy.

The politicians later claimed that at the meeting when Paget arrived in London, they merely gave verbal amplification to orders which he had already received from the War Office, but Asquith later admitted that this was untrue; at the meeting Paget was also told to send troops to Newry (an old, empty barracks with no stores) and Dundalk, both in Irish nationalist areas and so unlikely to be seized by the UVF, but of strategic importance in any move to bring Ulster under military control. It was later suggested (a claim believed by Sir James Fergusson, Charles Fergusson's son) that the move to deploy troops may have been a "plot" by Churchill and Seely to goad the loyalists into a rebellion which would then be put down, although this view is not universally held.

On the evening of 18 March, Paget wired Major-General Lovick Friend that the troop movements were to be completed by dawn on Sunday 31 March. Paget was summoned to another meeting on 19 March at which Seely declared that the government was pressing ahead with Home Rule and had no intention of allowing civil war to break out, suggesting that the UVF were to be crushed if they attempted to start one. Prince Louis of Battenberg (First Sea Lord) was also at the meeting, as that day the 3rd Battle Squadron was ordered to steam to Lamlash on the Firth of Clyde. The following night Churchill told French that his ships would have Belfast in flames in 24 hours, while other vessels were ready to help deploy troops to Ulster (in case of a strike by loyalist railwaymen). That evening, after Carson had stormed out of a Commons debate and departed for Ulster, where he was expected to declare a provisional government, Asquith, Seely, Churchill, Birrell, Field Marshal French, and General Paget had an emergency meeting at 10 Downing Street where Asquith insisted that extra infantry be sent to defend the artillery at Dundalk, which French wanted to withdraw. Seely claimed that a unionist coup was imminent in Ulster, although no trace of his intelligence survives.

== Resignations ==
Paget travelled to Dublin that night in a state of high excitement, having been given no written orders (it is unclear whether this was because the politicians were reluctant to put anything in writing).

The next morning (Friday 20 March), Paget addressed Generals Rolt, Cuthbert, Gough, and Fergusson (GOC 5th Infantry Division), and three staff officers, at his Parkgate Street H.Q. in Dublin. Three different accounts exist (written by Paget, by Fergusson, and by Gough in his memoirs Soldiering On), but it is clear that Paget exacerbated the situation. By Gough's account, he said that "active operations were to commence against Ulster". Paget then claimed that he had obtained "concessions" from Seely, namely that officers who lived in Ulster would be permitted to "disappear" for the duration, and that other officers who refused to serve against Ulster would be dismissed rather than being permitted to resign. French, Paget, and Adjutant-General Spencer Ewart had indeed (on 19 March) agreed to exclude officers with "direct family connections" to Ulster, and to dismiss other officers who refused to participate. Paget told Gough, who queried whether "disappear" meant absence with or without leave, and who had a family connection to Ulster but did not live there, that he could expect no mercy from "his old friend at the War Office" (John French). Richard Holmes wrote that in effectively offering his officers an ultimatum, Paget was acting foolishly, as the majority might simply have obeyed if simply ordered north. Paget ended the meeting by ordering his officers to speak to their subordinates and then report back. Fergusson collared Gough and one of the infantry brigadiers, and warned that the Army must hold together at all costs, and that he himself would obey orders. Gough said that he would not, and went off to speak to the officers of the 5th Lancers (one of the regiments under his command) and also sent a telegram to his brother Johnnie, Haig's Chief of Staff at Aldershot. Gough did not attend the second meeting in the afternoon, at which Paget confirmed that the purpose of the move was to overawe Ulster rather than fight. No provision was made for enlisted men who had conscientious objections. The deployment orders were headed "'Duty as ordered – Active Operations in Ulster", and Gough later suggested that "active operations" sounded as if it were much more than a cautionary protective deployment.

Gough offered the officers under his command at nearby Marlborough Barracks (now McKee Barracks) the choice of resignation rather than fighting against the Ulster Volunteers. The ultimatum was passed on to the rest of Gough's 3rd Cavalry Brigade 25 miles away at the Curragh Camp.

On the evening of 20 March, Paget sent a telegram to the War Office in London announcing that almost all the officers of 5th Lancers intended to resign and the same was probably true of 16th Lancers. Seely replied, on behalf of the Army Council, telling Paget to suspend any senior officer who had offered to resign, and ordering Gough and two of his three colonels (the attitude of the third was unclear) to report to the War Office. A second telegram just before midnight confirmed that 57 officers preferred to accept dismissal (it was actually 61 including Gough):

Officer Commanding 5th Lancers states that all officers, except two and one doubtful, are resigning their commissions today. I much fear same conditions in the 16th Lancers. Fear men will refuse to move. Regret to report Brigadier-General Gough and fifty-seven officers 3rd Cavalry Brigade prefer to accept dismissal if ordered North.

At the date of the incident, 70 officers were serving with the 3rd Cavalry Brigade. The officers were not technically guilty of mutiny, as they had resigned before refusing to carry out a direct order. As all were in Gough's brigade, and as they were informed of his reservations about Seely's orders, he was portrayed as central to the whole incident.

Chetwode was nominated to take Gough's place if necessary. Up to 100 other officers of Irish Command threatened to resign.

== Results ==
General Sir Charles Fergusson, then commanding the 5th Division in Ireland, toured units on the morning of Saturday 21 March to ensure their future compliance with government policy. One of his officers said later that

He [Fergusson] reminded us that although we must naturally hold private political views, officially we should not be on the side of any one political party. It was our duty to obey orders, to go wherever we were sent and to comply with instructions of any political party that happened to be in power. There was no sloppy sentiment; it was good stuff straight from the shoulder and just what we wanted.

Paget did the same, but his speech was described by a colonel as "absolutely unconvincing and inconclusive." However, Paget was able to conduct the precautionary moves planned on 18 and 19 March.

The elderly Field Marshal Roberts, who had recently exchanged "epithets" with French on the telephone over what he saw as French's collaboration with the government's "dastardly" plans, learned that Paget, in talking of "active operations" and in giving officers a chance to discuss hypothetical orders and threaten to resign, had been acting without authority and left a note for Hubert Gough to this effect. The King wrote to Asquith requesting that he be consulted before any further steps were taken.

Gough, summoned to the War Office, confirmed (Sunday 22 March) that he would have obeyed a direct order to move against Ulster. When he saw the King that evening, French, advised by Haldane (Lord Chancellor) that Paget should not have asked officers about "hypothetical contingencies," also threatened to resign if Gough were not reinstated. Paget was ordered to report to London, Macready was sent out to Belfast (but without official announcement) while Asquith informed the King that Paget had indeed exceeded his instructions, that only safeguarding of ammunition stores had been intended, that the naval deployment had been cancelled, and that there would be no further troop movement without consulting the King.

Asquith's Liberal government backed down, claiming an "honest misunderstanding." At French's suggestion Seely obtained a document from the Cabinet, stating that the Army Council were satisfied that the incident had been a misunderstanding, and that it was "the duty of all soldiers to obey lawful commands." Seely added two paragraphs, stating that the Government had the right to use "forces of the Crown" in Ireland or elsewhere, but had no intention of using force "to crush opposition to the Home Rule Bill." It is unclear whether this—amending a Cabinet document without Cabinet approval—was an honest blunder on Seely's part or whether he was encouraged to do so and then made a scapegoat. Gough insisted on adding a further paragraph clarifying that the Army would not be used to enforce Home Rule on Ulster, to which French concurred in writing. Wilson, Roberts and French had been leaking information to the press throughout the Incident. Gough promised to keep the 23 March Treaty confidential, but it soon leaked to the press—it appears that both Gough and French leaked it to Gwynne of the Morning Post, while Wilson leaked it to Leo Amery and Bonar Law.

The matter was debated in the Commons at length on 23 and 25 March. Asquith (25 March) publicly repudiated the "peccant paragraphs" which had been added to the Cabinet statement, and French, the Adjutant-General Spencer Ewart and Seely had to resign.

About a month later, on 24 April the Ulster Volunteers covertly landed about 24,000 rifles at night in the "Larne gun-running" incident. Its leaders considered that raiding the army's Ulster armouries would have lessened the public's goodwill towards it in Britain. Labour and radical opinion was outraged that the Army, apparently happy enough to suppress industrial unrest, had been allowed to prevent the use of force in Ulster.

The event contributed both to unionist confidence and to the growing Irish independence movement. In turn, this naturally increased nationalist support for its paramilitary force, the Irish Volunteers which saw a large increase in membership from 25,000 to 69,000 within one month (May 1914). While the Home Rule Bill was approved by the House of Commons on 25 May, the growing fear of civil war in Ireland led on to the government considering some form of partition of Ireland in July 1914 by an amending bill; further discussions at the Buckingham Palace Conference could not solve the arguments about partition. The main bill received royal assent as the Government of Ireland Act 1914 on 18 September, but was also suspended for the duration of the First World War.

== Gallery ==
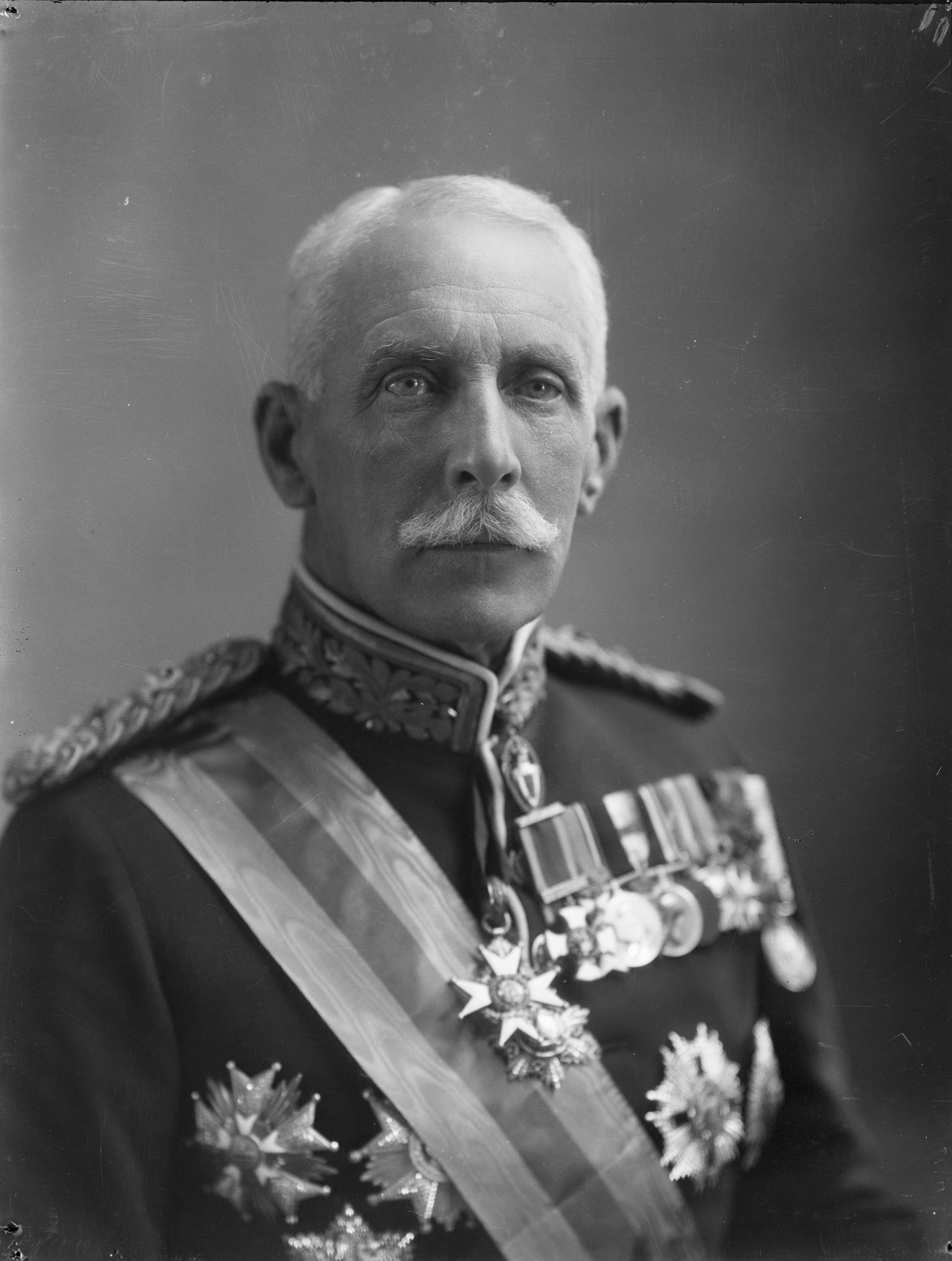
General Fergusson c.1926

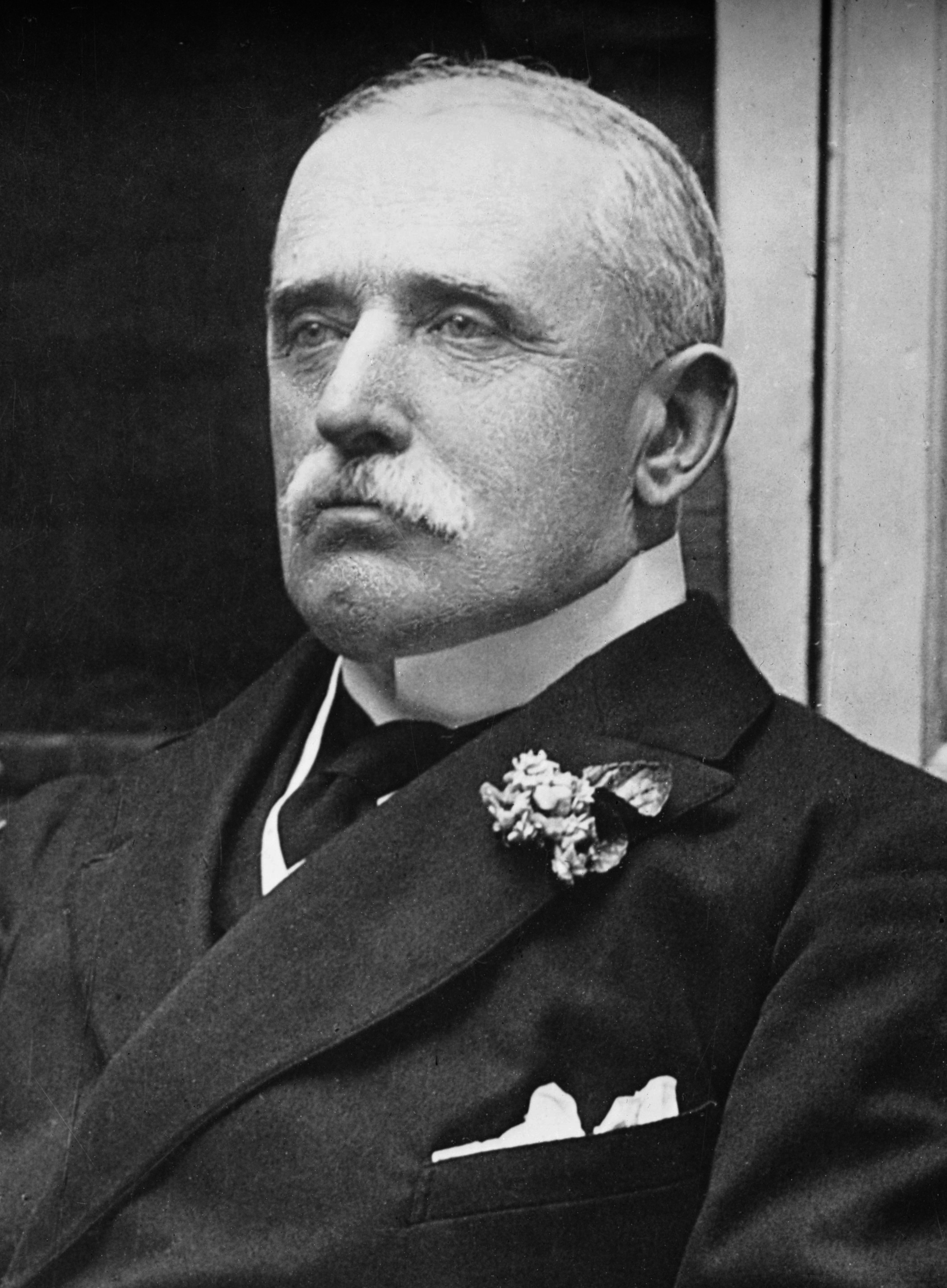
Field Marshal John French

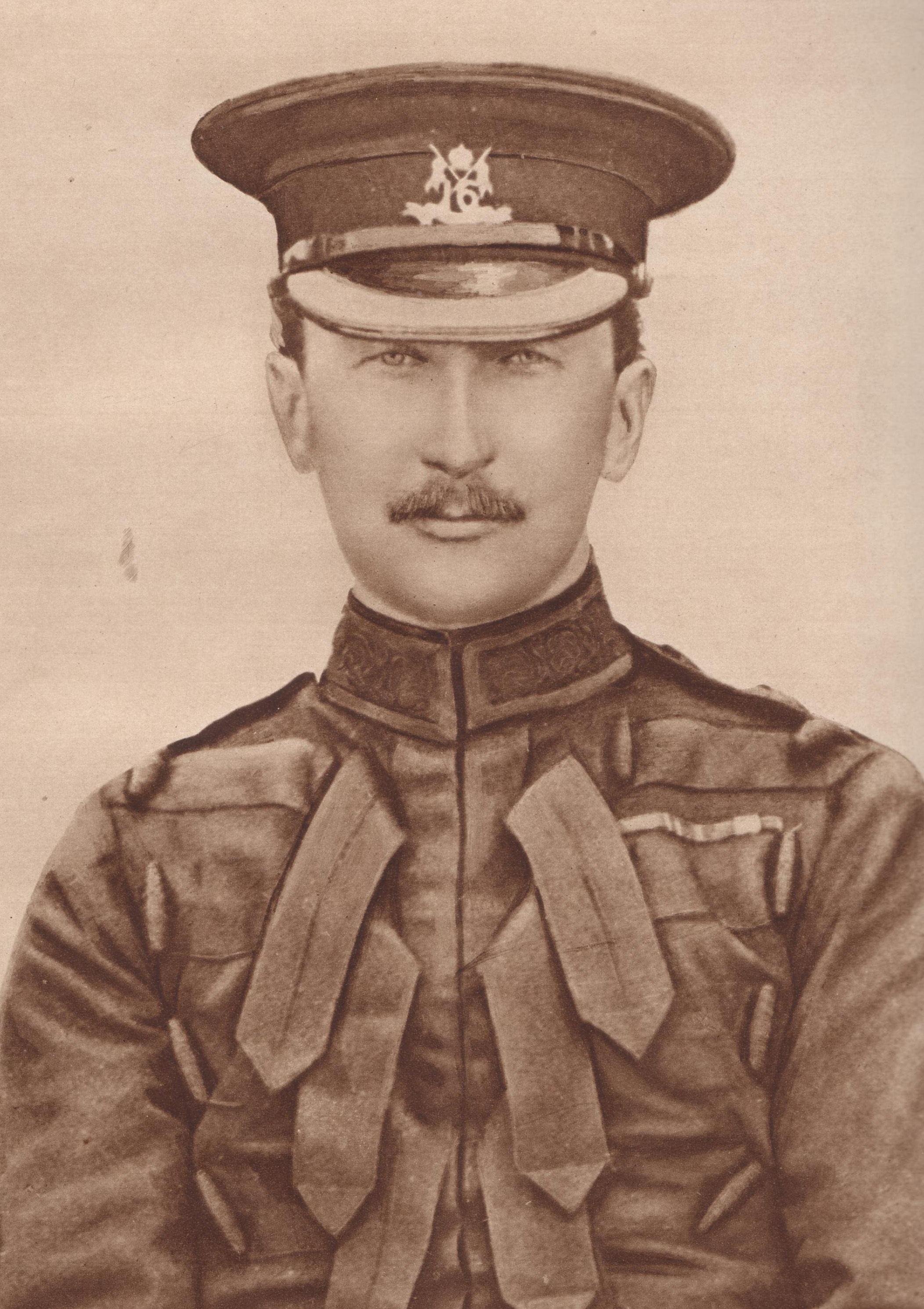
General Gough c.1900

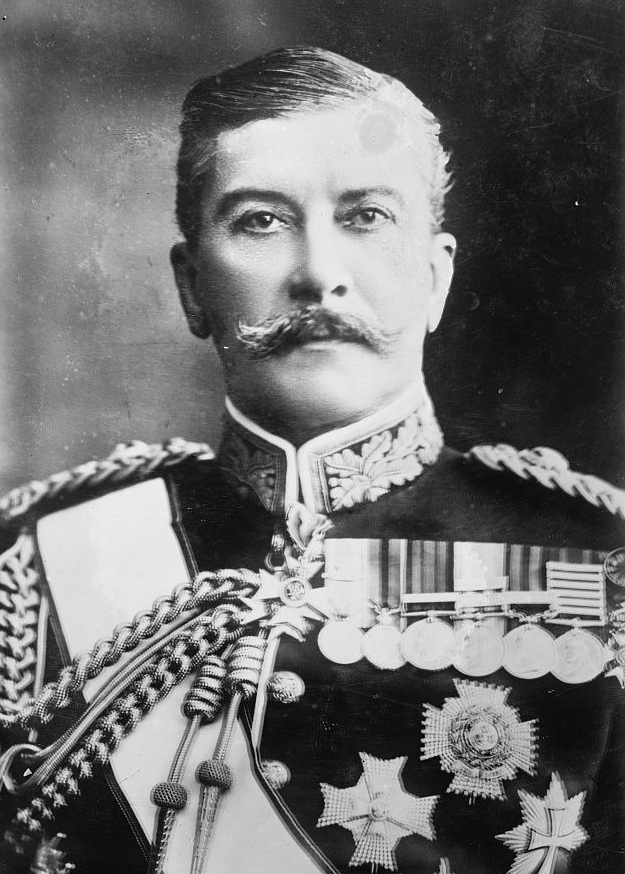
Sir Arthur Paget, GOC Irish Command in March 1914

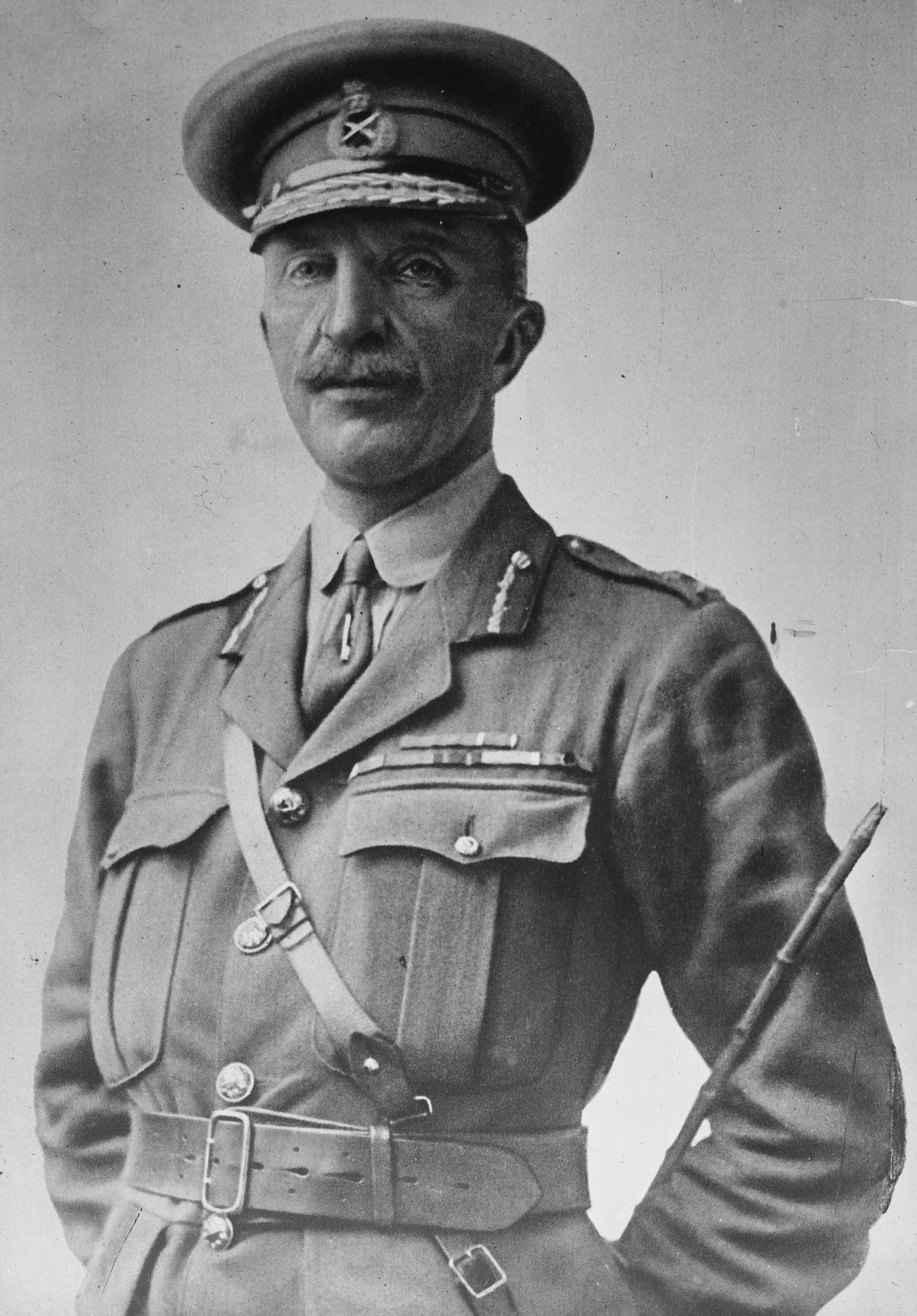
General Henry Wilson

== Cited works and further reading ==
Primary

- War Office (1914). Correspondence Relating to Recent Events in the Irish Command. Command papers. Vol. Cd.7318. London: HMSO.

Secondary

- Beckett, Ian F. W. The Army and the Curragh Incident 1914 Bodley Head for the ARS, 1986
- Blake, Robert. "The Curragh Incident". History Today (June 1956) 6#6 pp 395–402
- Fergusson, Sir James The Curragh Incident, London, 1964.
- Holmes, Richard (2004). The Little Field Marshal: A Life of Sir John French. Weidenfeld & Nicolson. ISBN 0-297-84614-0.
- Jeffery, Keith (2006). Field Marshal Sir Henry Wilson: A Political Soldier. Oxford University Press. ISBN 978-0-19-820358-2.
- O'Brien, William MP (1923) The Irish Revolution; Chapter IX
- Ryan, A. P. Mutiny at the Curragh, London, 1956.
