= Arthur Paget (British Army officer) =

British Army general (1851–1928)

General The Right Honourable Sir Arthur Paget GCB GCVO
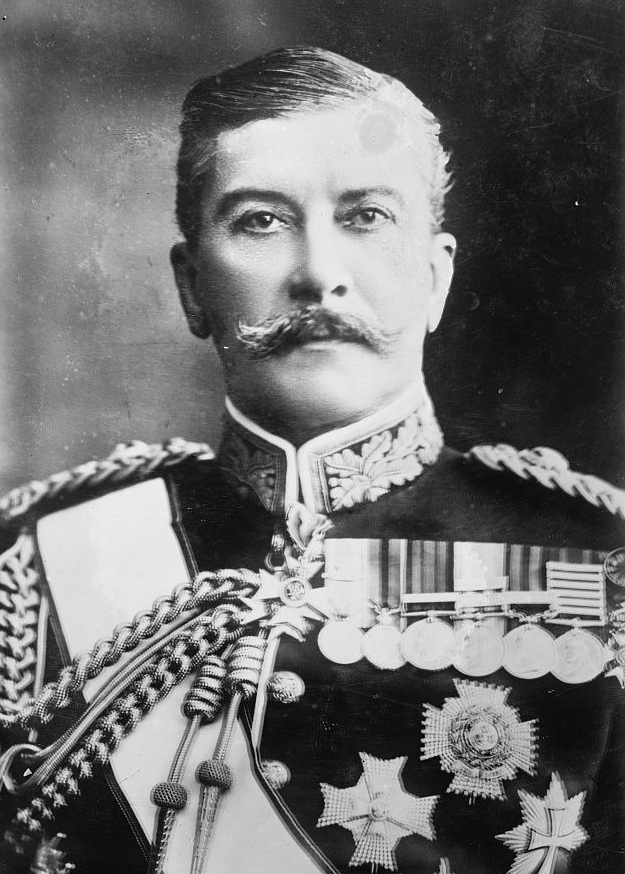

Commander-in-Chief, Ireland
- In office 1912–1914
- Preceded by: Sir Neville Lyttelton
- Succeeded by: Sir Lovick Friend

Personal details
- Born: 1 March 1851
- Died: 8 December 1928 (aged 77)
- Spouse: Mary Stevens (m. 1878; died 1919)
- Relations: Almeric Paget, 1st Baron Queenborough (brother); Henry William Paget, 1st Marquess of Anglesey (grandfather)
- Children: 4, including Louise
- Parent(s): Lord Alfred Paget; Cecilia Wyndham

Military service
- Allegiance: United Kingdom
- Years of service: 1869–1918
- Rank: General
- Commands: Southern Army; Irish Command; Eastern Command; 1st Infantry Division; 20th Brigade
- Battles/wars: Ashanti War; Second Boer War; First World War
- Awards: Knight Grand Cross of the Order of the Bath; Knight Grand Cross of the Royal Victorian Order

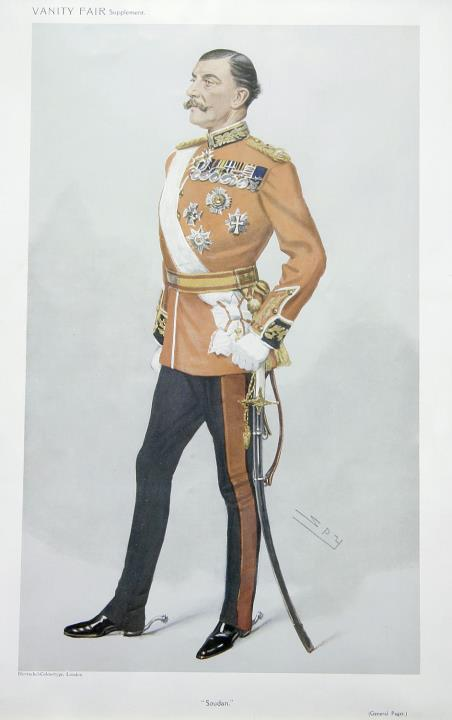
"Soudan", caricature by Spy in Vanity Fair, 1908

Sir Arthur Henry Fitzroy Paget, GCB, GCVO, PC (Ire) (1 March 1851 – 8 December 1928) was a British army general who served as Commander-in-Chief, Ireland, where he was partly responsible for the Curragh Incident.

== Early life ==
Paget was the son of Lord Alfred Paget; his paternal grandfather was Henry William Paget, 1st Marquess of Anglesey. His mother Cecilia (d. 1914) was the second daughter and co-heiress of George Thomas Wyndham of Cromer Hall in Norfolk.

Paget was born in Berkeley Square, London, on 1 March 1851, the eldest son of six sons and six daughters. Among his siblings were Gerald Cecil Stewart Paget (grandfather of Percy Bernard, 5th Earl of Bandon), Sydney Augustus Paget, Almeric Hugh Paget, 1st Baron Queenborough, and Alexandra Harriet Paget (wife of Edward Colebrooke, 1st Baron Colebrooke).

Paget was educated at Wellington College, and was a page of honour to Queen Victoria, entitling him to a free Guards commission (purchase of commissions being still in force until 1871).

== Career ==
=== Early career ===
Paget was gazetted ensign and lieutenant in the Scots Fusilier Guards on 12 June 1869 – the double rank was because Guards officers at that time held higher substantive rank in the army than in the regiment. He was promoted lieutenant and captain on 29 July 1872 and was selected for special service on Sir Garnet Wolseley's Asante expedition in West Africa in December 1873, being attached to William Butler's flanking column.

Paget returned to regimental duty in the UK. During the 1870s he was a leading owner of steeplechasers. Until 1878 he used the pen name "Mr Fitzroy". Under this pseudonym, Paget wrote several novels in the Naturalist style, recounting his exploits in the military.

He married, at St Peter's, Eaton Square, on 27 July 1878.

Paget was promoted captain and lieutenant-colonel on 1 April 1882. His battalion, the 2nd Scots Guards, went to Suakin in the Sudan in 1885. He served in Burma in 1887–8 (the aftermath of the Third Anglo-Burmese War) and, again, in the Sudan in 1888–9. He was promoted brevet colonel on 24 June 1895.

=== Boer War ===
In 1899 Paget was facing compulsory retirement on grounds of age. Instead he received command of the 1st Battalion Scots Guards and took it to the Second Boer War.

Paget was mentioned twice in despatches, and present at the Battle of Belmont and the Battle of Modder River. After that battle Colonel Paget temporarily took command of 1st (Guards) Brigade in Lord Methuen's 1st Division. Paget was also present at the Battle of Magersfontein. He received command of the new 20th Brigade (part of 1st Division) on promotion to major-general on 1 April 1900.

Paget was promoted to the staff, and in the later stages of the war was put in command of an independent column hunting Boer commandos. Many of Paget's Australian and New Zealand volunteers were disenchanted and wanted to go home before the expiry of their one-year term of service. Paget gave what Ian Beckett describes as a "blustering speech" to his whole assembled force in November 1900, refusing their request. Herbert Plumer had to pacify the men. Subsequently, they blamed Paget for ordering a costly frontal assault on Rhenoster Kop on 29 November 1900.

In June 1901, Paget resigned his command, intending to give up his career, after quarrelling with his superior, the Hon. Neville Lyttelton. Paget was persuaded by Edward VII, whom he knew well, to continue, Lord Roberts suggesting Paget was 'difficult with those above him'. Paget wrote to Sir John French praising his leadership in South Africa, and claiming that respect for him had been his reason for remaining in the Army.

=== 1902–1914 ===
The king wanted Paget to return to South Africa. However, he was appointed General Officer Commanding the 1st Infantry Division within 1st Army Corps in September 1902, and at the same time temporarily assumed command of the 2nd Infantry Brigade in the Marlborough lines at Aldershot, where the Brigade of Guards were to be quartered. He was also appointed CB and CVO.

He was promoted lieutenant general on 6 May 1906, and appointed a Knight Commander of the Royal Victorian Order and also appointed a Knight Commander of the Order of the Bath in 1907.

After eighteen months of unemployment Paget was appointed General Officer Commanding-in-Chief for Eastern Command on 4 April 1908. In that post in 1909 he seldom visited his office, preferring "other activities". In 1910 he was appointed a special ambassador to carry the news of King George V's accession to foreign courts. In September 1910 Sir John French declared that Sir Charles Douglas and Paget would 'command armies under him'. In 1911, when he "commanded" one of the forces on the Annual Manoeuvres, he did not actually attend, and his BGGS (brigadier-general, chief of staff) Aylmer Haldane had to brief him on the train from London to Salisbury so that he could participate in the discussion afterwards.

=== Curragh Incident ===
In 1912 Paget was appointed Commander-in-Chief, Ireland, and was sworn of the Privy Council of Ireland in 1912. He was appointed a Knight Grand Cross of the Order of the Bath in 1913, and promoted general on 5 March 1913. Lady Paget became a society hostess in Ireland.

With Irish Home Rule due to become law in 1914, the Cabinet were beginning to contemplate some kind of military action against the Ulster Volunteers who wanted no part of it. French (CIGS) and Seely (Secretary of State for War) summoned Paget to the War Office for talks. Paget's letter (19 October 1913) suggests that he wanted "partial mobilisation".

The following spring, Paget was sent a letter by the secretary of the Army Council warning that "evil-disposed persons" might attempt to seize weapons. Paget reported that he was drawing up plans to protect arms depots as ordered, but warning that large-scale troop movements would exacerbate the situation. Ian Beckett describes his response as "tentative". Paget was summoned to London for a meeting with the Cabinet Committee on Ireland and other officers.

Large scale military operations were clearly discussed at the meeting on 18 March, although most participants insisted that these were only precautionary measures. That evening (18 March) Paget wired Major General Lovick Friend that the troop movements were to be completed by dawn on Sunday 31 March. Another, hurried, meeting was held on the night of 19 March after Sir Edward Carson's dramatic departure from the Commons, amid rumours that he intended to declare a provisional government upon reaching Belfast. At that meeting Seely declared that the government was pressing ahead with Home Rule and had no intention of allowing civil war to break out, suggesting that the Ulster Volunteers were to be crushed if they attempted to start one. Paget said that he would "lead his Army to the Boyne” – French immediately told him not to be "a bloody fool". On his way to Dublin, Paget was seen in a highly excitable state at Euston railway station.

Paget was given no written orders. Ian Beckett writes that this was at his own request, although Richard Holmes wrote that it may have been because there were things which the politicians were reluctant to put in writing.

In Dublin the next morning (Friday 20 March), Paget addressed senior officers at his headquarters. Three different accounts (written by Paget, Fergusson (GOC 5th Division) and Gough in his 1954 memoirs Soldiering On) exist, but it is clear that Paget exacerbated the situation. Paget claimed that with French's assistance he had obtained "concessions" from Seely, namely that officers who lived in Ulster would be permitted to "disappear" for the duration, but that other officers who refused to serve against Ulster would be dismissed rather than being permitted to resign. By Gough's account, he said that "active operations were to commence against Ulster" and that Gough – who had a family connection to Ulster but did not actually live there – could expect no mercy from his "old friend at the War Office" (French, Paget and Ewart had actually (on 19 March) agreed that officers with "direct family connections" to Ulster should be left behind). In effectively offering his officers an ultimatum, Paget was acting foolishly, as the majority would probably have obeyed if simply ordered north. Paget is reported to have ended the meeting by ordering his officers to speak to their subordinates and then report back. Gough did not attend the second meeting in the afternoon, at which Paget confirmed that the purpose of the move was to overawe Ulster rather than fight, but at which he claimed that the orders had the king's personal sanction. The king was later displeased when it became known that Paget had used his name in this way, and was unconvinced when Paget tried to blame Fergusson (who accepted the blame).

Paget later insisted that he had wanted 'to ascertain upon what other officers he could rely' and that he had not wanted an ultimatum to be given to junior officers.

Paget informed the War Office by telegram (evening of 20 March) that 57 officers preferred to accept dismissal (it was actually 61 including Gough). On the morning of Saturday 21 March Fergusson toured units, assuring them of his own unionist sympathies but urging them to do their duty – this action had a good effect. Paget did the same but his speech was described by one colonel as "absolutely unconvincing and inconclusive".

The elderly Field-Marshal Roberts later learned from an interview with Seely (21 March) that Paget had been acting without authority in talking of "active operations" and in giving officers a chance to discuss hypothetical orders and attempt to resign. This news helped persuade Hubert Gough to remain in the Army, albeit with a written guarantee (which the government then repudiated) that the Army would not be used against Ulster.

Paget was, in the end, able to conduct the precautionary moves planned on 18 and 19 March.

=== First World War and later life ===
Paget relinquished Irish Command on the outbreak of the First World War. He continued to serve during the war, although not in France.

Despite being fit for service, on the outbreak of war Paget was relegated to command of First Army of Central Force, for defence against invasion. Sir John French blocked Paget from being given command of the new BEF III Corps (it went to Pulteney) in October 1914, or being appointed British representative at French GQG. Edmonds, who was a source of gossipy and exaggerated stories in old age, later claimed that Paget had been the best candidate for III Corps but that French passed him over having had a row with him on the Army Manoeuvres of 1913.

Kitchener was concerned at the limited information he was receiving from Major General John Hanbury-Williams, his representative at the Russian High Command STAVKA (at this stage it was still hoped that Russia would defeat the Central Powers in Poland and Galicia and march on Berlin). He considered sending Paget, either in Hanbury-Williams' place or as senior both to Hanbury-Williams and to Alfred Knox the military attaché in Petrograd. He interviewed Paget and informed Foreign Secretary Sir Edward Grey of his decision (13 October 1914), and that Paget was persona grata with the Tsar. Kitchener abandoned his plans two days later after he received a message from Russian foreign minister Sergey Sazonov, via Ambassador George Buchanan, that this would sour relations with the Russian commander-in-chief Grand Duke Nicholas, who would regard this as an attempt to strong-arm him. He was made colonel of the Buffs (East Kent Regiment) (later the Buffs (Royal East Kent Regiment)) in November, succeeding Major General Robert Kekewich.

French tried to obtain a BEF Army command for him in June 1915 (Richard Holmes wrote that French remained fond of him but insisted on his suitability despite "impressive evidence to the contrary"). Both Haig and Robertson were completely opposed to his being appointed GOC of the new Third Army, activated that month. He was appointed to command the Salisbury Plain training area in 1915. From April 1916 to February 1918 he commanded Southern Army, charged with the defence of South-East England, reporting to Viscount French who was by then Commander-in-Chief of Home Forces.

Paget retired from the army on 20 December 1918. That year he was appointed King of Arms of the Order of the British Empire. He spent much of the remainder of his life at Cannes, where he died at the Villa Valhalla, Chemin de Benefiat, on 8 December 1928, and was buried in Le Grand Jas cemetery.

=== Personality and assessments ===
Besides his main interest in horse racing, Paget also hunted and fished and later took up gardening, golf, and yachting. He later became interested in botany.

Paget talked of the "dirty swine of politicians. Scornful of formal study of war, he once remarked that he 'lived history rather than read it' (The Times, 10 Dec 1928).

Sir Harold Nicolson wrote that "he was not a man of measured language or meek tact". Victor Bonham-Carter (p78 of "Soldier True", his biography of Robertson) described him less diplomatically as "a stupid, arrogant, quick-tempered man". Ian Beckett describes him as "while often genial ... also inclined to be pompous, and liable to angry rambling. He was the wrong man in the wrong place as the Irish home rule crisis deepened ... It is important to emphasize that no direct orders of any kind were disobeyed, exacerbating Paget's error in offering a choice whether to obey orders in the event that they were issued".

== Personal life ==
In July 1878, Paget married the American heiress Mary "Minnie" Fiske Stevens (1853–1919) daughter of Massachusetts hotel proprietors Paran Stevens and Marietta Reed. She was a major beneficiary of her father's estate, which was the subject of thirty years' litigation after his death in 1872. Described by Ian Beckett as "vivacious", she became a noted London society hostess, famed for her jewels. She organised bazaars and functions in aid of armed forces charities. Lady Paget died of influenza in Paris in May 1919.

The Pagets had three sons, who all became army officers, and one daughter:

- Albert Edward Sydney Louis Paget (1879–1917), who was unmarried. He died on active service from the effects of poison gas in August 1917.
- Louise Margaret Leila Wemyss Paget (1881–1958), who married her third cousin, the diplomat Sir Ralph Paget, son of Sir Augustus Berkeley Paget and Walburga von Hohenthal.
- Arthur Wyndham Louis Paget (1888–1966), who married Rosemary Victoria Lowry-Corry, daughter of Brig.-Gen. Noel Armar Lowry-Corry.
- Reginald Scudamore George Paget (1888–1931), who married Minnie Louise Claussenius, an actress whose stage name was Jane Field.

== Notes ==
Court offices
Preceded by Charles Phipps	Page of Honour; 1861–1867	Succeeded by George Grey
Military offices
New command	General Officer Commanding 1st Division; 1902–1906	Succeeded by James Grierson
Preceded by Lord Methuen	GOC-in-C Eastern Command; 1908–1912	Succeeded by Sir James Grierson
Preceded by Sir Neville Lyttelton	Commander-in-Chief, Ireland; 1912–1914	Succeeded by Sir Lovick Friend
Heraldic offices
New title	King of Arms of the Order of the British Empire; 1918–1928	Succeeded by Sir Herbert Heath
