= Army Manoeuvres of 1912 =

1912 military exercise

The Army Manoeuvres of 1912 was the last military exercise of its kind conducted by the British Army before the outbreak of the First World War (the Army Manoeuvres of 1913 were on a much smaller scale). In the manoeuvres, Sir James Grierson decisively beat Douglas Haig, calling into question Haig's abilities as a field commander.

J. E. B. Seely, the Secretary of State for War had invited General Ferdinand Foch, a Russian delegation under Grand Duke Nicholas, and the Ministers for Defence of Canada (Sam Hughes) and South Africa (Jan Smuts). King George V arranged to visit the battlefield.

== Scenario ==
The forces of an imaginary country (Red) had crossed the frontier dividing Red from Britain (Blue) between Wells-next-the-Sea and Hunstanton. Red forces were pushing south as quickly as possible. Blue had ordered a general mobilisation and its prime goal was to stop Red forces entering London: Blue forces were based around Cambridge. Time was of the essence for both sides.

The Chief Umpire was Sir John French, who was based in Cambridge.

== Forces ==
The forces were nearly equal in size. Each consisted of a cavalry division, two infantry divisions, army troops, two aeroplane flights, and an airship. (The airships were Gamma and Delta.)

=== Red Army ===
- Commander: Lieutenant General Douglas Haig
- Cavalry: Major General Edmund Allenby
- 1st Division: Major General Samuel Lomax
- 2nd Division: Major General Henry Lawson

=== Blue Army ===
- Commander: Lieutenant General James Grierson
- Cavalry: Colonel Charles Briggs
- 3rd Division: Major General Henry Rawlinson
- 4th Division: Major General Thomas D'Oyly Snow

=== Organisational strength ===
However, despite the near equality of the forces on paper, the odds were in Haig's favour, as his forces were cohesive, with superior organisation and training, whilst Grierson's were more of a scratch team.

- The Staff of the Red Army were the Aldershot command, who were accustomed to working together. In contrast, the Blue Staff were drawn from all commands except Aldershot.
- The Red cavalry was a division of regular cavalry, while the Blue cavalry was a disparate group of two brigades drawing on the Household Cavalry, Scots Greys, Yeomanry, and Cyclists.
- The Red infantry was the Aldershot divisions. The Blue infantry came from the Southern Command (3rd Division) and Eastern Command (4th Division and Territorials).

Also as the 'invader' Haig had the initiative.

== Progress of the manoeuvres ==
16 September 1912

The Blue cavalry was pushed forward to the line Gog Magog—Rivey Hill. Grierson issued orders to his aircraft pilots to locate the enemy which they did within an hour of take-off. At the suggestion of Major Trenchard (who was accompanying one of the pilots), the Blue aircraft were then dispatched to inform the Blue cavalry of the enemy location. The intervention of aircraft handed Grierson the element of surprise and, although the Red forces also employed aircraft, they were unable to regain the initiative. According to his diary, Grierson "stayed in camp all day receiving reports and very soon locating all the lines of march and halting places of the Red forces".

17 September 1912

Blue cavalry advanced to locate the enemy and fought with the 2nd Division near Hundon in Suffolk. The 3rd Division ended the day in position from Reid's Farm to Rivey Hill. The 4th Division concealed itself from aircraft and, after dark, moved through Saffron Walden and camped to the east of it.

18 September 1912

The Blue infantry was ordered to advance to the line Horseheath—Helions Bumpstead. The hitherto concealed 4th Division closed up on the right of the 3rd, which had been strung out to represent the main force. The Blue cavalry was ordered to co-operate on the right of the 4th Division and the Territorials to advance from Cambridge to Linton. In the ensuing 'battle', Blue forces won a clear victory, bringing the manoeuvres to a close a day early. Grierson had the 10th Brigade in hand. Although the Red cavalry were somewhere to the rear of the Blue forces, they were not deployed in the battle. Haig was thus defeated in front of his own staff, the King, and the foreign observers.

The Blue forces bivouacked at Linton and Grierson celebrated his victory with champagne.

19 September 1912

At the final conference in Trinity Hall, the King presiding, the opponents were asked to explain their tactics and moves. Grierson was well received. "He looked like victory", said one observer. His speech was confident, lucid, and vigorous.

In contrast, Haig's speech was disastrous. According to John Charteris, he did not read out his written statement, which gave a "clear and convincing account of his views, he did not even refer to it when he spoke but to the dismay of his staff attempted to extemporise. In the effort he became totally unintelligible and unbearably dull. The university dignitaries soon fell asleep, Haig's friends became more and more uncomfortable, only he seemed totally unconscious of his failure."

Warner suggests that the notes Haig made in advance might have been prepared on the assumption that the battle was evenly balanced and would have sounded absurd if used after the result was declared.

== Analysis ==
"Haig was completely out-generalled by Grierson, in spite of the efforts of the umpires and judges to make the contest appear more even.". A major factor, surprising in view of Haig's interest in aircraft, was that Grierson had almost perfect knowledge from air spotting of the movements of Haig's troops, whereas he had hidden his from observation so that Haig never knew where the Blue forces were. In his speech at Trinity Hall, Grierson recounted "I told them to look as like toadstools as they could and to make noises like oysters."

Haig learnt the lessons of the manoeuvres and thenceforth encouraged the development of observer aircraft, and used more aircraft in the 1913 manoeuvres.

Grierson's style also encouraged his staff to take responsibility. Sir Percy Radcliffe recalls that he was sent with an order to throw in the Territorials at a certain point. Seeing there was not time, on his own initiative he threw them in at another with total success.

== Anecdotes ==
Things went wrong for Seely, the Secretary of State for War:

- His horse went lame and its replacement was delayed, so Seely kept the King waiting, for which he apologised. When the pair paused in their ride, the King cried out, "I wish you would stop your horse eating my foot." Seely jabbed the mount, but the King's foot was badly bruised. Seely apologised again but the King was displeased.
- Seely galloped ahead to their destination to find the Canadian and South African Ministers for Defence in a fist fight. The King witnessed the brawl and Seely apologised yet again.

== Literature ==
- Report on the British Manoeuvres of 1912 by General Foch, (cited in English translation in Patricia E. Prestwich, 'French Attitudes Towards Britain, 1911–1914' (Ph.D. thesis, Stanford University, 1973, p. 297.)
