= Samuel Lomax =

British Army officer (1855–1915)

Lieutenant-General Samuel Lomax CB
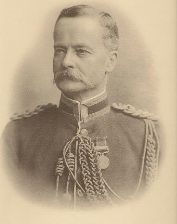
- Born: 2 August 1855
- Died: 10 April 1915 (aged 59); London, England
- Military career
- Allegiance: United Kingdom
- Branch: British Army
- Service years: 1874–1914
- Rank: Lieutenant-General
- Units: 90th Regiment of Foot; Cameronians
- Commands: 1st Division
- Conflicts: Ninth Cape Frontier War; Zulu War; Battle of Kambula; Battle of Ulundi; First World War; Battle of Le Cateau; First Battle of the Marne; First Battle of the Aisne; First Battle of Ypres (DOW)
- Awards: Companion of the Order of the Bath; Mentioned in Despatches

Lieutenant-General Samuel Holt Lomax, CB (2 August 1855 – 10 April 1915) was a British Army officer who commanded the 1st Division during the early battles of the First World War. He was fatally wounded in action in October 1914 at the First Battle of Ypres, being one of the most senior British officers to die on active service during the war.

== Early military career ==
Born 2 August 1855 to Thomas and Mary Helen Lomax of Grove Park in Yoxford, Suffolk, Lomax joined the Scottish 90th Regiment of Foot as a junior officer aged eighteen in June 1874. In 1877 he went with the regiment to South Africa and participated in the Ninth Cape Frontier War, and the latter phase of the Zulu War in 1878, seeing action at Kambula and Ulundi, which secured British victory in the campaign.

Returning to Britain with his regiment, Lomax was promoted to captain following the Cardwell Reforms which amalgamated his regiment into the Scottish Rifles in 1881. His unit was not called on for service in India or the Second Boer War and he did not see further action for 36 years. Lomax was promoted to captain in July 1880 and major in July 1889.

He attended the Staff College, Camberley, from 1891 to 1892 and was promoted to lieutenant colonel in October 1897, when he took command of his battalion, which he would command for four years, so missing action in South Africa. After relinquishing command of the battalion in October 1901, he was placed on half-pay and promoted to colonel on the same date.

In early 1902, he was transferred to a temporary staff posting as assistant adjutant general (AAG) of the 2nd Army Corps from 26 February 1902, an appointment which was made permanent later the same year. In April 1904 he was promoted to the temporary rank of brigadier general and given an operational command, the 10th Infantry Brigade, taking over from Major General William Franklyn. He relinquished command of the brigade in April 1908 and went on to half-pay. He was promoted to major general while still on half-pay in June.

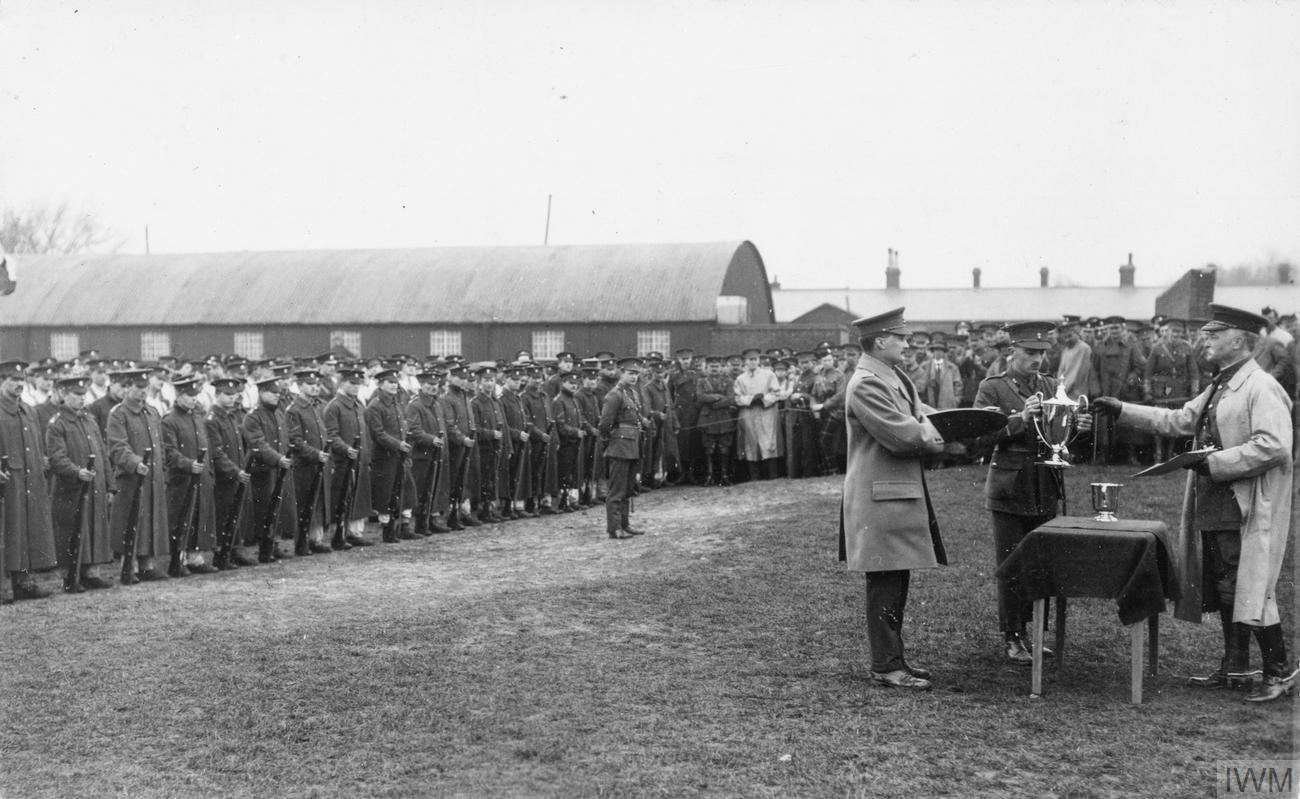
Major General Lomax presenting the Connaught Shield and a cup to officers of the 2nd Battalion, Royal Munster Fusiliers, following the unit's victory in the competition, Aldershot 1914.

In August 1910 he was given command of the 1st Division, in succession to Lieutenant General Sir James Grierson. This was normally a four-year posting, and in late July 1914 he received notice that he would not be further employed due to his advanced age and lack of operational experience.

== First World War ==
The outbreak of the First World War in August 1914 put all plans of retirement on hold and Lomax was given command of the British Army's 1st Division as part of the British Expeditionary Force (BEF) being dispatched to France under the leadership of Field Marshal Sir John French. After taking part in the Battle of Mons later in the month, Lomax commanded the division through the First Battle of the Marne, and in the counter-attack on the German invasion of the West at the First Battle of the Aisne. His direction of operations was so accomplished that it has been said that he was "the best Divisional General in the early days of the war". On 19 October he received notice that he was to be promoted to the rank of lieutenant general, and was marked to be given the command of a corps when one next became available. His promotion came through on 27 October, dated back to 14 October, "for distinguished service in the Field".

=== First Battle of Ypres ===
In late October 1914 the 1st Division was engaged in heavy fighting at the First Battle of Ypres in Belgium, with its headquarters in a chateau at Hooge, recently vacated by Lieutenant General Sir Douglas Haig, commanding I Corps. During the course of the battle, at a moment of crisis with the 1st Division's line under mounting pressure from a German attack threatening the destruction of the 1st Division and I Corps as a whole and a breach of the line being contested, Lomax received an offer from Haig of reinforcements from I Corps rapidly diminishing reserve troop strength being sent up to his sector to shore up its crumbling defences, Lomax refusing by reply, stating: "More troops now only means more casualties, it is artillery fire that is wanted". On 31 October 1914, at the height of the battle, with the Germans launching repeated mass man assaults on the weakening British line, supported by concentrated barrages of fire from their artillery, a meeting took place at the chateau H.Q. between Lomax and his 2nd Division counterpart, Major General Charles Monro. An eye-witness at the scene noted that the officers' staff parked along the roadside outside the building provided an obvious target to German artillery spotters seeking targets to call fire down on to. A German aviator is thought to have noticed the gathering and reported it to a German artillery unit, which fired several 5.9" shells at the chateau. Both sides had been targeting chateaux on either side of the line in an attempt to kill senior officers to gain some advantage in the dead-locked battle by this stage. The first shell exploded in the chateau's garden, causing the staff officers at the meeting to go to the windows of the garden room to see the result of the detonation, when the second shell landed in front of them, the blast killing six and seriously wounding Lomax and another officer. A third shell struck an empty part of the house, its owner, Baron de Vinck, narrowly escaping injury from that blast. General Monro had stepped into another room in the building with his chief of staff just before the shells struck, and survived with minor injuries; however, Lomax was seriously wounded and medically evacuated back to England. Major General David Henderson stepped in to assume command of the 1st Division.

== Death ==
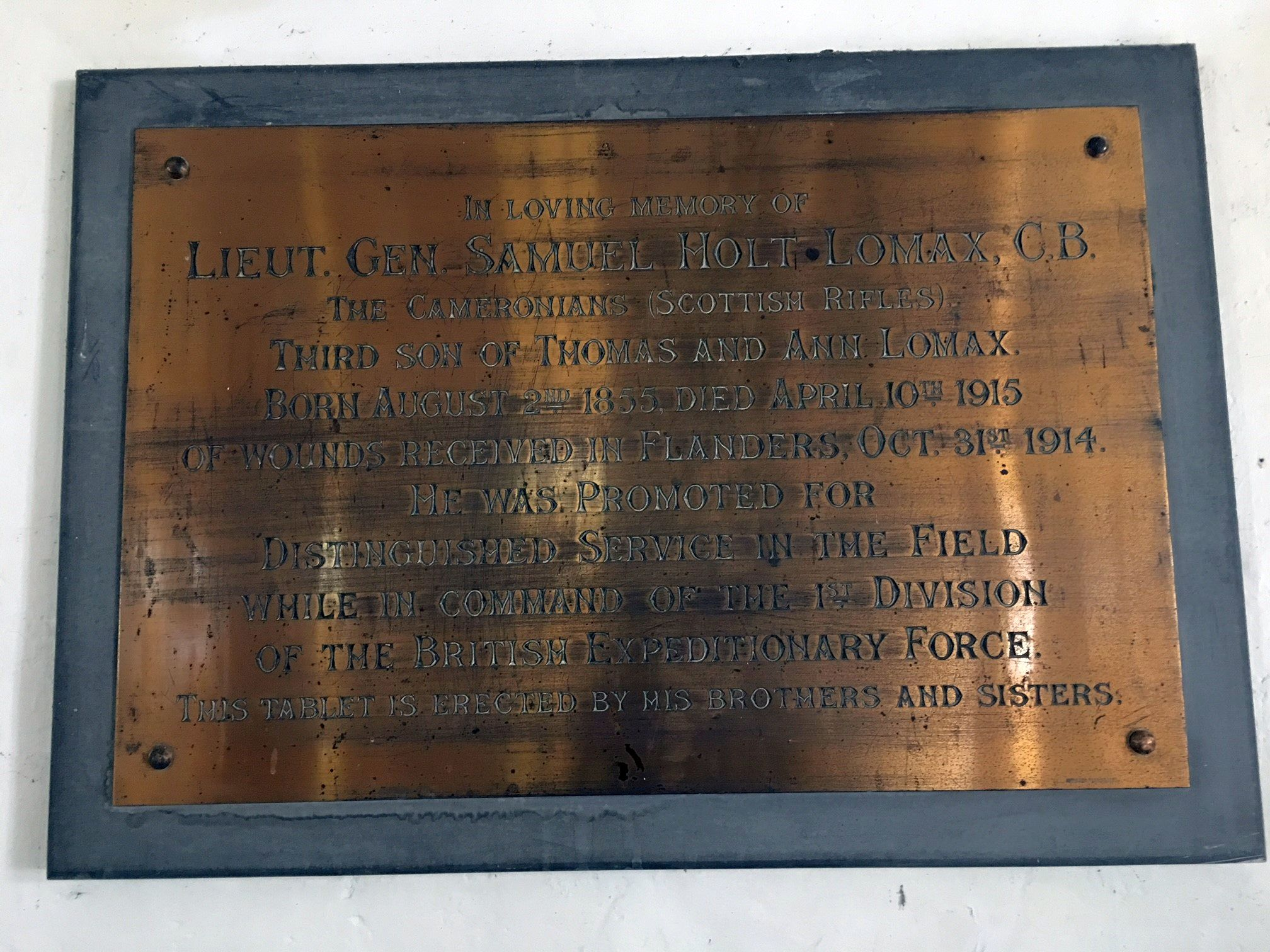
Samuel Lomax memorial in St Peter's Church at Yoxford

On arrival back in England, Lomax was treated in a nursing home in London, where he received palliative care for the next five months before dying of his wounds in his 60th year on 10 April 1915. His body was cremated at Golders Green Crematorium, and his ashes were buried at Aldershot Military Cemetery, later to be joined by his wife's under a private headstone.

Sir Arthur Conan Doyle later wrote that Lomax's early death in the war had deprived the British high command of a talented general, which "was a brain injury to the Army and a desperately serious one."

== See also ==
- List of generals of the British Empire who died during the First World War

== Bibliography ==
- Victor Bonham-Carter (1963). Soldier True:the Life and Times of Field-Marshal Sir William Robertson. London: Frederick Muller Limited.
- Frank Davies & Graham Maddocks (1995). Bloody Red Tabs. Leo Cooper. ISBN 0-85052-463-6.

Military offices
Preceded by James Grierson	GOC 1st Division; 1910−1914	Succeeded by Herman Landon
