= Battle of Rhenosterkop =

1900 Battle of the Second Boer War

- Part of Second Boer War
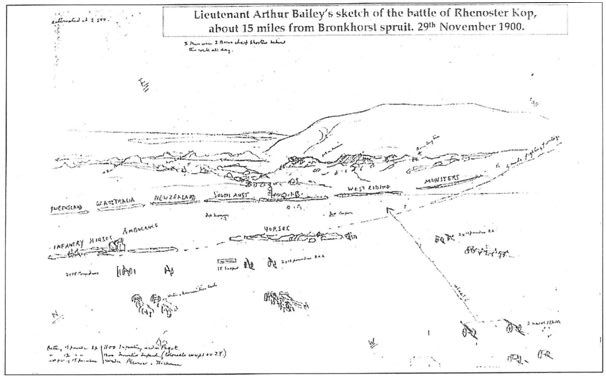
- Sketch by Lt. Arthur Bailey of the battle
Date	29 November 1900
Location	Renosterkop, 30 km north of Bronkhorstspruit
Result	Boer Victory

Belligerents
United Kingdom	South African Republic

Commanders and leaders
(United Kingdom of Great Britain and Ireland) Arthur Paget	(South African Republic) Ben Viljoen

Strength
5,000	500

Casualties and losses
106 wounded, 15 dead	24 wounded, 2 dead

The Battle of Rhenosterkop (also known as the Battle of Renosterkop) took place on 29 November 1900, during the Second Boer War. The British, led by Arthur Paget, launched an assault on Viljoen's position at Renosterkop, which consisted of three primary attacks. All assaults failed, with the Boers repelling the assault, however retreating at night due to a lack of supplies.

== Prelude ==
The British, for some time, had been looking to eliminate the Commando led by Ben Viljoen, who was operating Northeast of Pretoria. For multiple days, skirmishes between Viljoen's commando and the British forces in the area had occurred, afterwards, Viljoen dug himself into a defensive position 30 km north of Bronkhorstspruit, at Rhenosterkop.

On 27 November, Viljoen was made aware that a large contingent of British soldiers was sent to find him and fight him. He sends a scouting party from his positions to gather intelligence on British soldiers and their movements, whilst his men dig a 5 km front, with trenches and fortifications. At his disposal were only 500 men, a Maxim Nordenfeldt 15-pounder and a Krupp cannon.

The same day, the scouting party made contact with the advancing British forces, and they retreated back to their defensive positions. On 28 November, the British, having an idea as to where Viljoen was, opened fire on his positions with artillery for most of the day.

== Battle ==
On 29 November, Arthur Paget launched a frontal attack. It started with an infantry attack on Viljoen's left flank but it was beaten off by the Boers with accurate rifle and fire from the Maxim Nordenfeldt. The second attack was against the center of the defenses, but the British were once again beaten back by the Boers.

The third attack was also against the center of the front, this time more to the right where Viljoen himself was waiting. Once again the attack is repulsed with heavy losses on the British side. The British forces fell back to continue the next day. However, the Boer forces withdrew at night because they ran out of ammunition and other supplies.

== Aftermath ==
The British suffered 87 casualties (73 wounded, 14 dead) , whilst the Boers only took 26 casualties (24 wounded, 2 dead).
