= Army Manoeuvres of 1913 =

1913 military exercise

The Army Manoeuvres of 1913 was a large exercise held by the British Army in the Midlands in September 1913. Learning from the Army Manoeuvres of 1912, many more spotter aircraft were used. The manoeuvres highlighted Sir John French's deficiencies as a commander.

== Order of battle ==
Brown Force

This comprised two infantry corps and a cavalry division.

- Commander: Sir John French
- Chief of the General Staff (CGS): James Grierson
- Corps commanders: Lieutenant General Sir Douglas Haig, General Sir Arthur Paget
- Cavalry commander: Major General Edmund Allenby

White Force

This was an inferior force consisting largely of Territorials and Yeomanry with elements of Royal Scots Greys, 19th. Royal Hussars and Household Regiment.

- Commander: Major General Charles Monro

== Exercise premise ==
Three imaginary countries were involved. The central power [Whiteland] found itself suddenly confronted simultaneously by Greenland to its north with whom it had been in dispute for some time and Brownland to its south with whom it had previously enjoyed a friendly relationship. The manoeuvres involved the conflict between Brownland which crossed Whiteland's southern border with two armies and the less substantial White forces, centred on Daventry, which were to oppose them.

== The manoeuvres ==
The manoeuvres excited much attention, both locally and nationally. King George V and Queen Mary were present along with Winston Churchill, then First Lord of the Admiralty, and Baden-Powell. There were military observers from most of the major European powers along with representatives from the colonies. The Times described these Exercises as essentially a practice of command function in an expeditionary force of four infantry and one cavalry divisions. 50,000 men and 25,000 horses had been brought into north Buckinghamshire and south Northamptonshire where they were dispersed for three weeks of training before being assembled to form the two forces which engaged each other over five days from 22 September. The smaller White Army formed a target force to enable the Brown Army to engage it and pursue it in its retreat. Brown's 1st Army, under Lieutenant General Sir Douglas Haig, advanced through central Buckinghamshire to engage White forces by crossing the River Ouse to take Buckingham and Silverstone, and then sweep north to the White entrenchment which had been prepared south of Daventry. There they joined up with the left flank of the Brown 2nd Army. This army under command of General Sir A. H. Paget had de-trained at Wolverton before advancing up the Watling Street through Towcester and then moving northwest to attack the White Army's prepared position south of Daventry which was where it was to make its stand. Allenby's cavalry had been detailed to protect the Brown Force's left flank, advancing through Brackley towards the west of Daventry, where they could engage possible White reinforcements dispatched from Redditch and Leamington Spa.

This involved the White forces in a "fighting retreat", a complex manoeuvre which was designed to enable a retreating force to fall back with minimal loss. This was achieved by a series of rear-guard actions which held off their opponent's advanced forces allowing an orderly withdrawal to a new defensive position. The White Army appeared successful in this, even though it was inferior both in size and also the quality of its soldiers [being mainly Territorial Forces]. However it was never going to be able to overwhelm its opponents who, after hours of tough and difficult fighting on day four whilst crossing in front of the White entrenchments, had managed to overrun the forward White Army defences. This made victory inevitable for the Brown forces. On the morning of day five, the umpires declared that the Brown Army had achieved its objectives, bringing the manoeuvres to an end.

A final conference was held at the Weedon Barracks which was addressed by the King and then Sir John French. A more detailed report was published by the War Office in January 1914. In this, the role of aircraft in reconnaissance was given far greater consideration as it had been recognised that they had been instrumental in the unexpected defeat of Sir Douglas Haig's forces by Sir James Grierson in the 1912 manoeuvres. Both Royal Flying Corps and Royal Naval Air Service sent squadrons. The majority of these along with the only airship were allocated to the White Forces as it was realised that the larger Brown Forces offered the better target for observation. All other logistical support was assessed which included the involvement of cyclist battalions and early motorised transport. Major General Snow's 4th division was given an Austin flatbed truck for use 'in the field' and this performed unexpectedly well - another example of the impact new technologies were to have on warfare. Cavalry, however, were judged to be vulnerable when operating in the 'closed country' of south Northamptonshire where the hedged lanes forced them to close up into an easy target for rifle and machine gun fire.

== The British Expeditionary Force of August 1914 ==
Eight months later many of the men involved in the Manoeuvres of 1913, including most of the senior officers, were dispatched to northern France as part of the small [75,000 men] British Expeditionary Force (BEF). Sir John French commanded two corps which were placed under Sir Douglas Haig and Sir Horace Smith-Dorrien, Sir James Grierson having collapsed and died shortly after his arrival in France. They engaged Von Kluck's First German Army on its sweep through Belgium, in its attempt to encircle the Anglo-French forces. Their limited numbers were compensated by the professionalism of the BEF which withstood two weeks of intense fighting in its 'Retreat from Mons', holding off much larger, but conscripted, German forces. This allowed an orderly Allied retreat before their counter-attack at the Aisne and the Marne which was made possible by the skill of the Royal Flying Corps. Professional and militarily trained, their pilots' reconnaissance was the first to detect that the Germans had changed direction to attack the French left flank giving the Allies their opportunity to deny the Germans their planned rapid victory. But the consequence of this was to plunge Europe into the four year catastrophe of the Great War.

The exercises of 1912 and 1913 had played their part in preventing German dominance in Europe.

== Assessment of tactics ==
Henry Wilson criticised Haig for leaving a gap of three miles in his line.

Douglas Haig noted in his diary, "Sir John French's instructions for moving along the front of his enemy (then halted on a fortified position) and subsequently attacking the latter's distant flank, were of such an unpractical nature that his Chief of the General Staff demurred. Some slight modifications in the orders were permitted, but Grierson ceased to be his CGS on mobilization, and was very soon transferred to another appointment in the BEF." This entry may well have been written up after the event to reflect Haig's increasing disillusion with the abilities of his former patron.

"Sir John French had problems at the 1913 manoeuvres, when his two Corps diverged, and his opponent, Gough, refused to stay still."
