= James Grierson (British Army officer) =

British soldier

Lieutenant-General Sir James Grierson KCB CMG CVO
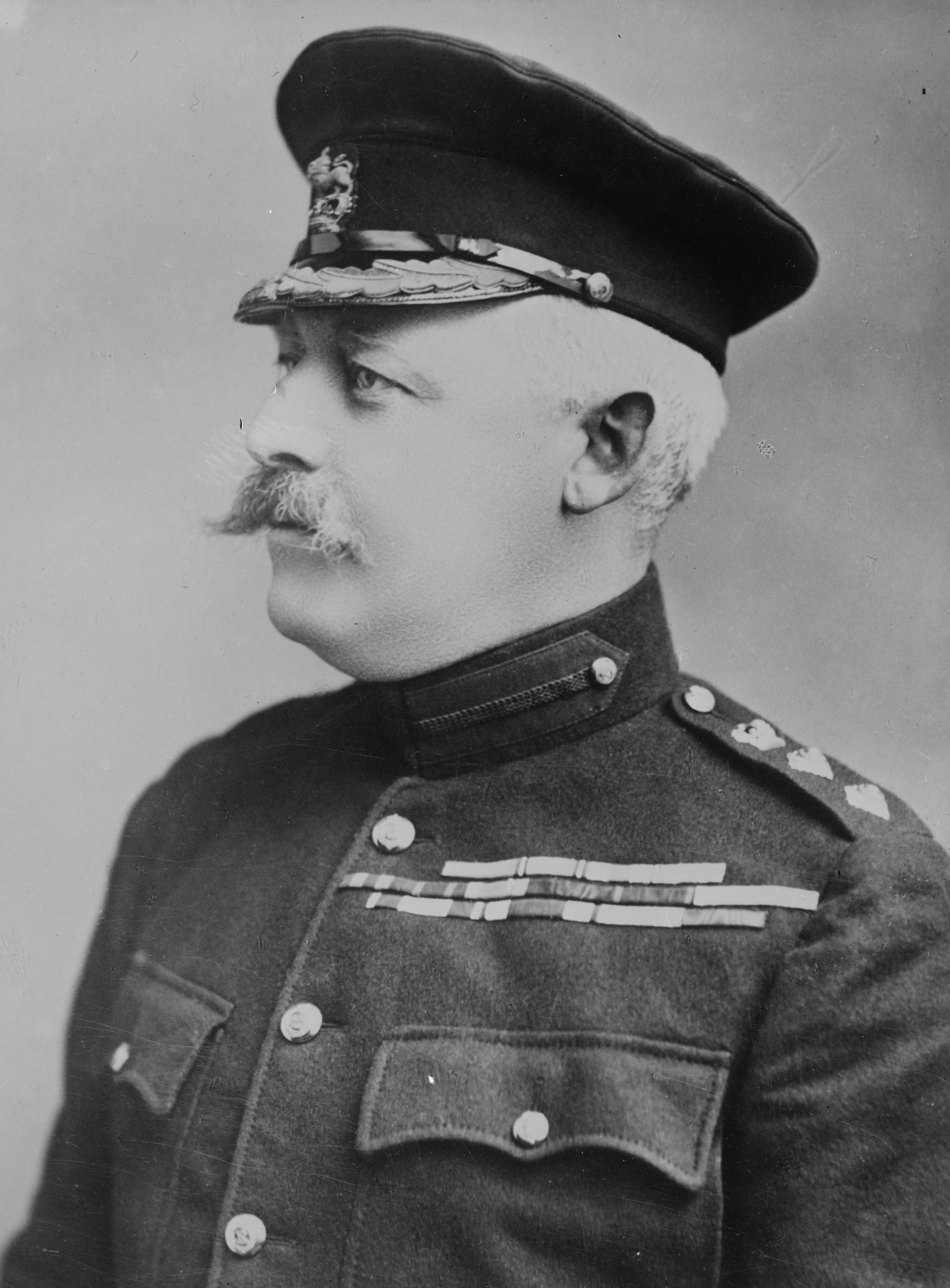
- Grierson as a colonel
- Born: 27 January 1859; Glasgow, Scotland
- Died: 17 August 1914 (aged 55)
- Military career
- Allegiance: United Kingdom
- Branch: British Army
- Service years: 1877–1914
- Rank: Lieutenant-General
- Units: Anglo-Egyptian War; Boxer Rebellion; Second Boer War; World War I
- Commands: 1st Division; Eastern Command
- Awards: Knight Commander of the Order of the Bath; Companion of the Order of St Michael and St George; Commander of the Royal Victorian Order

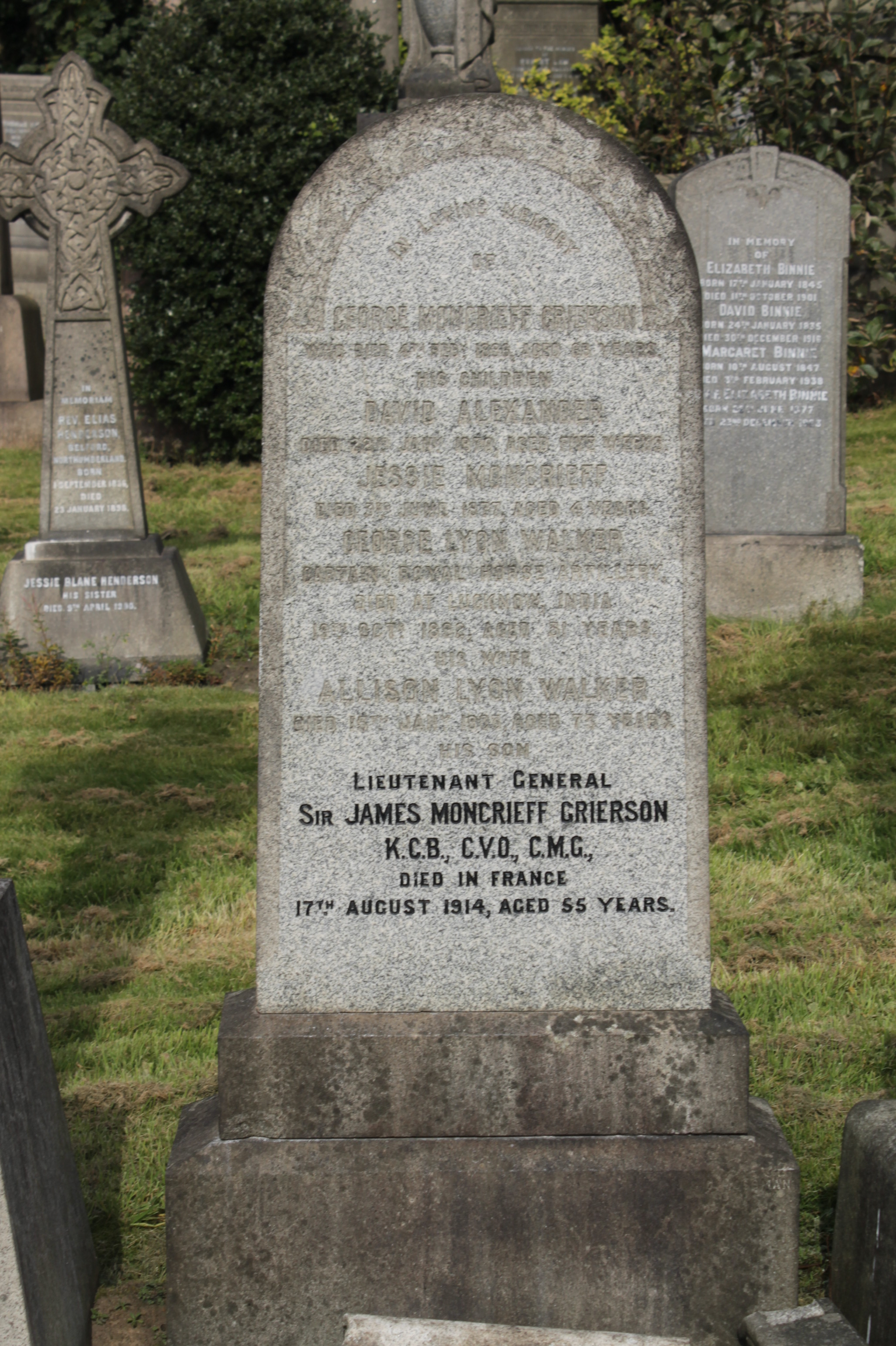
The grave of Lt General James Moncrieff Grierson, Glasgow Necropolis

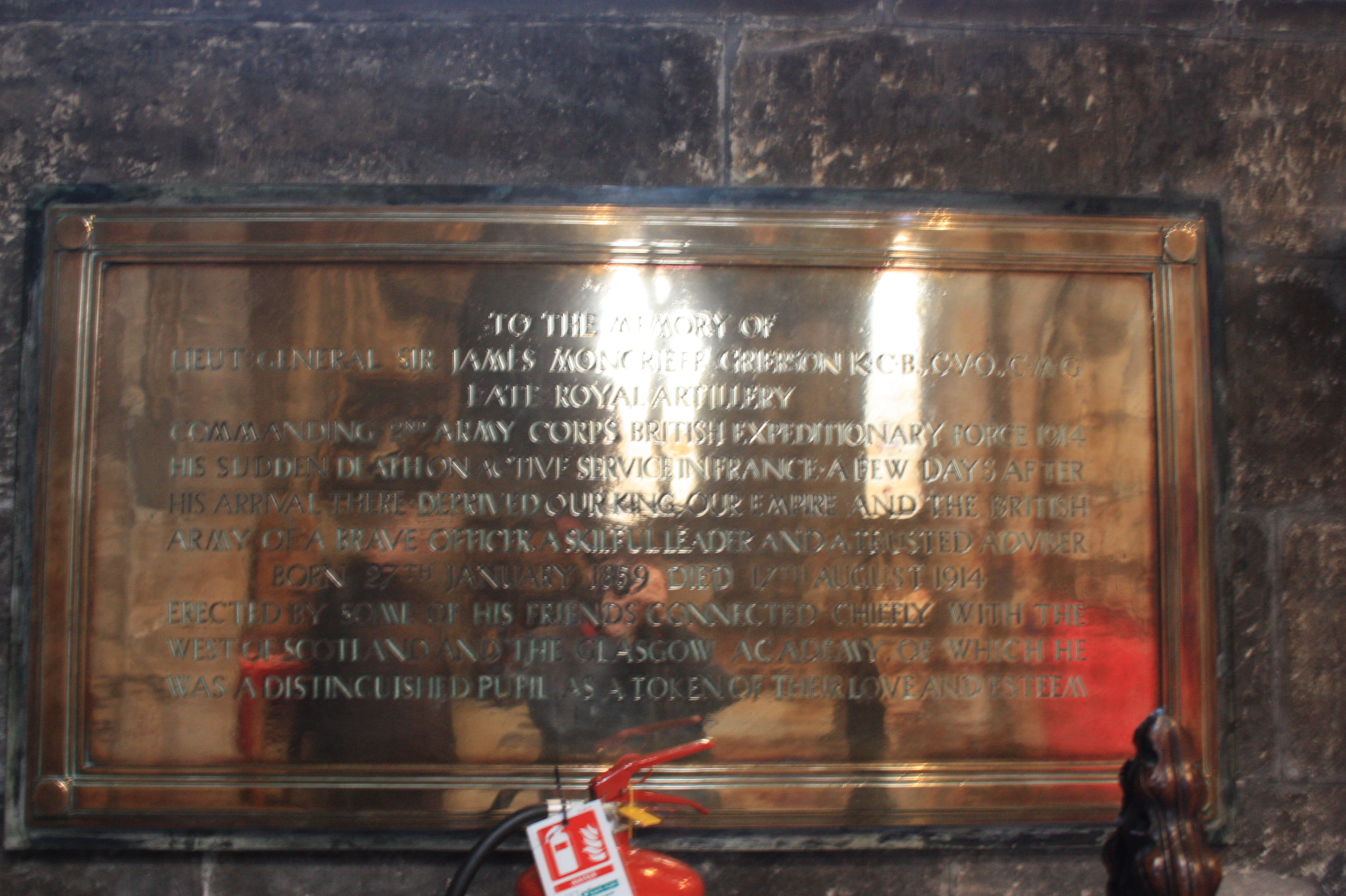
Plaque to Sir James Moncrieff Grierson, Glasgow Cathedral

Lieutenant-General Sir James Moncrieff Grierson, KCB, CMG, CVO (27 January 1859 – 17 August 1914) was a British soldier.

== Life ==
He was born in 1859 the son of George Moncrieff Grierson and his wife Allison Lyon Walker.

Grierson was commissioned into the Royal Artillery in October 1877.

He served in the Egyptian War including the actions at Kassassin and Tel el Kebir, as Deputy Assistant Quartermaster General with the Indian contingent in 1882. He was Deputy Assistant Adjutant and Quartermaster General for the Sudan expedition and was involved in actions at Suakin, Hasheen and Tamai in 1885. He was Deputy Assistant Quartermaster General for 2nd Brigade during the Hazara expedition in 1888. He was appointed Deputy Assistant Adjutant General, Intelligence, at Army Headquarters in 1890 and then, after being seconded for service on the staff, became brigade major for the Royal Artillery at Aldershot from 1895 to 1896 when he became military attaché in Berlin acquiring what Sir John French later described as "an intimate knowledge of the German army."

He served in China during the Boxer Rebellion in 1900, and later the same year in the Second Boer War in South Africa when he was made an assistant adjutant general in February 1900. Grierson was in charge of army baggage during General Roberts’s march on Bloemfontein.

After returning from the war he became Assistant Quartermaster General for the 2nd Army Corps and Chief Staff Officer to Sir Evelyn Wood, commanding the corps; and was promoted to the substantive rank of colonel on 28 October 1901. In early 1902 he was ordered for temporary duty in the Remount Department. Later that year he returned to his position in the 2nd Army corps, where he was appointed a Brigadier-General on the Staff and Chief Staff Officer of the corps from 4 September 1902. He was promoted to major general in February 1904.

Grierson was appointed director of military operations (DMO at army headquarters in 1904. As DMO, Grierson and his deputy William Robertson organised the Strategic War Game of 1905, which persuaded them that British intervention (still expected to be deployed to Antwerp at this stage) was necessary to avoid French defeat in the event of a Franco-German war. Grierson acted as umpire for the wargame. In January 1906, as the First Moroccan Crisis continued, Grierson was tasked with drawing up detailed plans for deployment of an expeditionary force to Le Havre in the event of war. Grierson and Robertson began talks with the French General Staff and with the French military attaché, Colonel Victor Huguet, and that same year Grierson, Robertson and Huguet toured the Charleroi to Namur area. However, little further progress was made until after Henry Wilson became DMO in 1910.

Grierson was then appointed general officer commanding (GOC) of the 1st Division at Aldershot Command in October 1906, taking over from Lieutenant General Arthur Paget.

Promoted in May 1910 to lieutenant general, he succeeded Lieutenant General Sir Arthur Paget as general officer commanding-in-chief (GOC-in-C) of Eastern Command in April 1912.

In the Army Manoeuvres of 1912, he made full use of aircraft reconnaissance to decisively beat Douglas Haig, despite Haig having the odds in his favour.

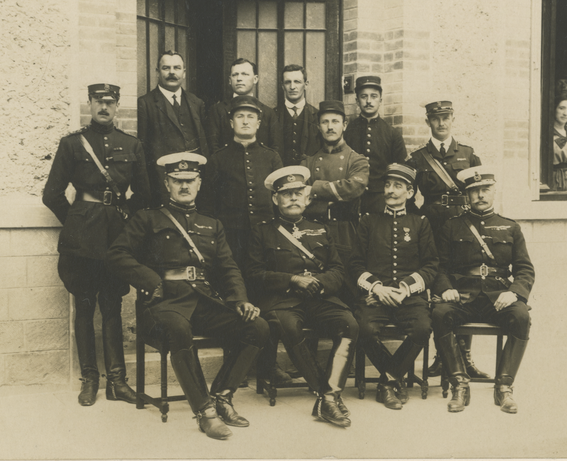
British and French officers at French manoeuvres, 1914. Lieutenant General Grierson is sat in the front row, second on the left, to the left of Major General Allenby.

In the Army Manoeuvres of 1913, Grierson acted as Chief of the General Staff (CGS) for Sir John French. Haig noted in his diary, "Sir John French's instructions for moving along the front of his enemy (then halted on a fortified position) and subsequently attacking the latter's distant flank, were of such an unpractical nature that his Chief of the General Staff demurred. Some slight modifications in the orders were permitted, but Grierson ceased to be his CGS on mobilization, and was very soon transferred to another appointment in the BEF." Even before leaving the field of the manoeuvres (26 September 1913), French told Wilson that he was not satisfied with Grierson's performance. Murray was appointed chief of staff designate in his place. French himself described Grierson as a "dear old friend and comrade", ..who astonished French soldiers by his knowledge of the history of their regiments and whose "military acquirements were brilliant and in every respect up to date."

In June 1914 he succeeded Lieutenant General Spencer Ewart as aide-de-camp general to King George V.

Grierson was very overweight and used to go red in the face from bending over, due to high blood pressure. James Edward Edmonds later claimed that Grierson's staff were issued with penknives to bleed him if necessary when his blood pressure got too high. He died of an aneurism of the heart on a train, near Amiens at 7:00 a.m. on 17 August 1914. His replacement as commander of II Corps was Sir Horace Smith-Dorrien. Grierson spoke French fluently and was a personal friend of Haig, the commander of I Corps, so it is possible that relations over the next few days, both between the two British corps and with the French, might have been better had he lived.

Grierson's body was repatriated, a practice allowed at that time, and is buried in the Glasgow Necropolis in PRIMUS 38 with his sister, father and mother. These were full interments. The grave lies north of the path connecting the south-east corner of the upper plateau with the low-lying southern section.

== Recognition ==
The Sir James Moncrieff Grierson Prize for languages was later established at the Royal Military Academy Sandhurst.

== Medals and Orders ==
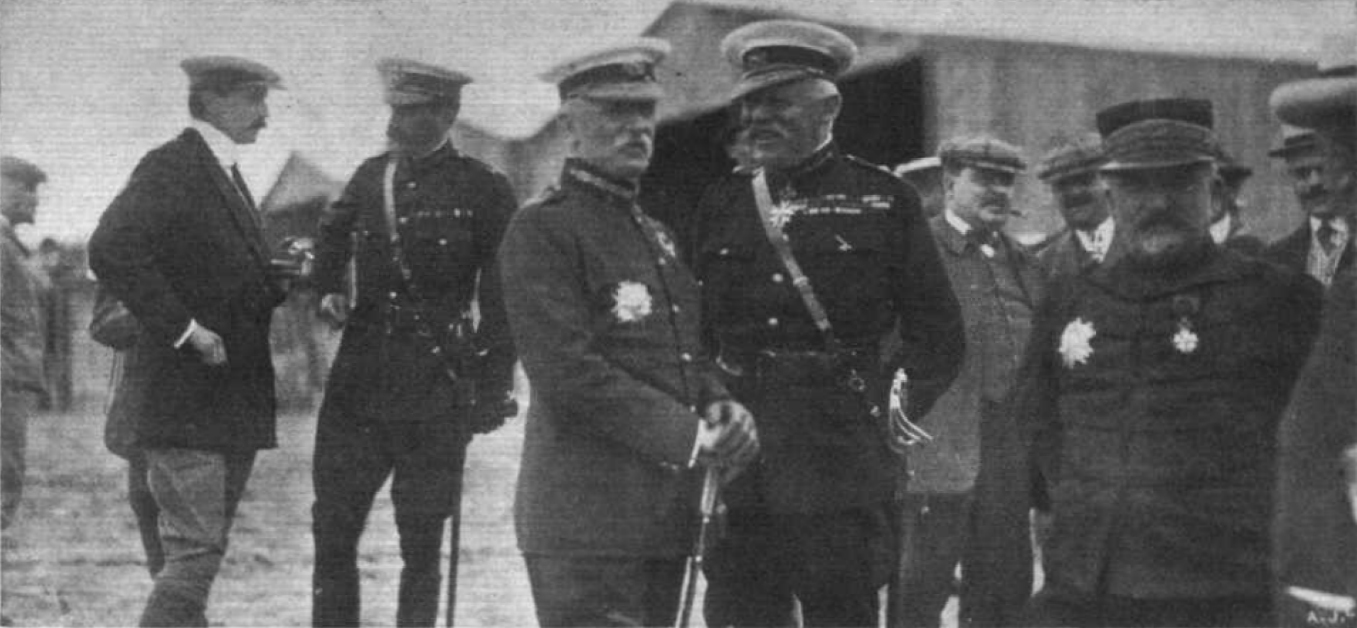
Grierson at Rheims in 1909 (shown in the centre with hands behind back)

British decorations

- Companion of the Order of St Michael and St George (CMG) - 26 June 1902 - Coronation Honours list
- Royal Victorian Order, Commander (CVO) - 1904 (Member MVO 1890s)
- Knight Commander of the Order of the Bath (KCB), 1911 (Companion (CB) 29 November 1900, in recognition of the services during operations in China)
- Knight of Grace of The Most Venerable Order of the Hospital of St. John of Jerusalem
- Egypt Medal, 1882, clasps for "Tel el Kebir" and "Suakin 1885"
- India General Service Medal (1854), clasp for "Hazara 1888"
- Queen Victoria Diamond Jubilee Medal
- Queen's South Africa Medal, clasps for "Cape Colony", "Driefontein", "Johannesburg", and "Diamond Hill"
- China War Medal (1900)
- King Edward VII Coronation Medal
- King George V Coronation Medal
- Aide de Camp General to the King

Foreign decorations

- 5th Class, Order of the Medjidie, Ottoman Empire
- Khedive's Star, Khedivate of Egypt - 1882
- 1st Class, Order of the Crown, Kingdom of Prussia - 1901 - on the termination of his appointment as Military Attaché at Berlin (he had previously received the 2nd class of the same order in late 1899, in connection with a visit of Emperor Wilhelm II to the United Kingdom.)
- Albert Order Medal, Kingdom of Saxony - 1911
- Knight Grand Cross of the Order of the Crown of Siam, Kingdom of Thailand - 1911
- King Rama VI's Coronation Medal, Kingdom of Thailand - 1911

== Publications by Grierson ==
- Notes on the Turkish Army Simla 1882 (compiled for the Intelligence Branch, India)
- A Vocabulary of the Arabic Language Roorkee 1882
- The War in Turkomania: Skobeleff's Campaign of 1880-81 Translated from the Russian of Major-General N. I. Grodekov. Simla 1884-85
- The Armed Strength of Russia Two editions: London 1886 and 1892 (compiled for the Intelligence Branch, London)
- The Armed Strength of Japan London 1886 (compiled for the Intelligence Branch, London)
- The Armed Strength of the German Empire Two editions: London 1888 and 1892 (compiled for the Intelligence Branch, London)
- Staff Duties in the Field: With Notes by Lieut.-General H. Brackenbury London 1891
- Handbook of the Military Forces of Russia London 1894 (compiled for the Intelligence Branch, London)
- Umpiring at Field Manoeuvres as practised by various foreign armies (Aldershot Military Society Lectures, No. 51) Aldershot 1894
- Die Heere und Flotten der Gegenwart: II: Grossbritannien und Irland The British Army. Berlin 1897
- Records of the Scottish Volunteer Force, 1859–1908 Edinburgh and London 1909
- Military Papers and Articles, Translations, Reviews contributed to military journals both British and foreign, and to the daily press.

Military offices
Preceded by William Nicholson (As Director General of Mobilisation and Military Intelligence)	Director of Military Operations; 1904–1906	Succeeded by Spencer Ewart
Preceded by Arthur Paget	General Officer Commanding the 1st Division; 1906–1910	Succeeded by Samuel Lomax
Preceded by Sir Arthur Paget	GOC-in-C Eastern Command; 1912–1914	Succeeded by Sir Charles Woollcombe
Preceded by New Post	GOC II Corps; August 1914	Succeeded by Horace Smith-Dorrien
