= John Maxwell (British Army officer) =

British Army general and colonial governor (1859–1929)

General The Right Honourable Sir John Maxwell GCB KCMG CVO DSO
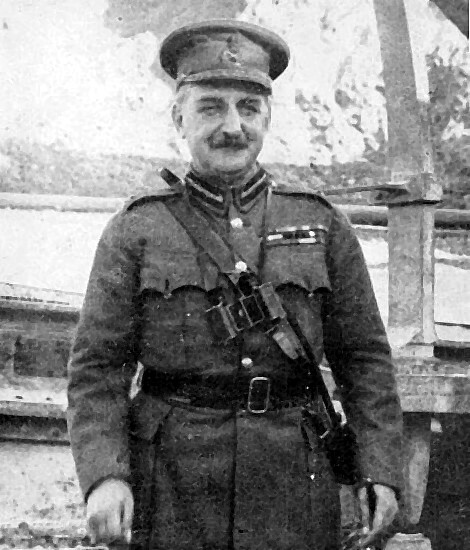
- Maxwell in 1916
- Born: 11 July 1859; Liverpool, England
- Died: 21 February 1929 (aged 69); Newlands, Cape Province, Union of South Africa
- Military career
- Allegiance: United Kingdom
- Branch: British Army
- Service years: 1866–1921
- Rank: General
- Commands: Northern Command; Commander-in-Chief, Ireland; British Troops in Egypt; 14th Brigade
- Conflicts: Second Boer War; First World War; Easter Rising
- Awards: Knight Grand Cross of the Order of the Bath; Knight Commander of the Order of St Michael and St George; Commander of the Royal Victorian Order; Distinguished Service Order; Mentioned in Despatches; Order of Osmanieh (Ottoman Empire); Grand Cross of the Order of the Nile (Egypt); Grand Cross of the Order of the Crown (Italy); Knight of the Order of the White Eagle (Russia)

General Sir John Grenfell Maxwell, GCB, KCMG, CVO, DSO (11 July 1859 – 21 February 1929) was a British Army officer and colonial governor. He served in the Mahdist War in the Sudan, the Second Boer War, and in the First World War. As Commander-in-Chief, Ireland, he was one of the commanders in the repression of the 1916 Easter Rising, including overseeing the courts-martial after the rebellion. Maxwell retired in 1922.

== Early life ==
Maxwell was born in Aigburth, Liverpool, on 11 July 1859 to a family of Scottish Protestant heritage. He attended school at Cheltenham College, studied at the Royal Military College, Sandhurst, from 1878 and was commissioned into the 42nd foot (Royal Highlanders) in March 1879.

== Early military career ==
Maxwell served with the Black Watch in the Anglo-Egyptian War of 1882, taking part in the storming of the Egyptian fortifications at Tel-El-Kabir and rising to the rank of captain. He was first mentioned in despatches as an assistant provost-marshal and camp commandant during the Nile Expedition of 1884–1885. He played an active role with the Egyptian frontier forces in the Sudan, and won a Distinguished Service Order (DSO) in the engagement at Ginnis and was also present in the battle at Gemaizah in 1888. He was made brevet major in November 1889.

During the reconquest of Sudan he led the 2nd Egyptian Brigade, and, promoted while on half-pay to major in September 1897, was present at the 1898 Battles of the Atbara and Omdurman, where he was among the first to enter the Khalifa's palace. In 1897 he was appointed Governor of Nubia and in 1898 was appointed Governor of Omdurman. For his services in Egypt, he received in early 1900 the 2nd class of the Order of the Medjidie from the Sultan Abdul Hamid II.

== Second Boer War ==
Maxwell served in South Africa during the Second Boer War (1899–1902). He departed Southampton in the SS Mexican in February 1900, and arrived in Cape Town the following month to take up a staff appointment. He commanded the 14th Brigade from April 1900, taking part in Lord Roberts' march to Pretoria, and after the city's successful occupation served as Military Governor of Pretoria and the Western Transvaal from June 1900 to March 1902, when he relinquished the office to allow for gradual extension of civilian rule. As governor, he filled a difficult post "with great tact and ability ... gained the confidence and esteem of the general public" according to a contemporary news report. After leaving Pretoria he held a command in the Western district, before returning to the United Kingdom in July 1902, a month after the end of the war. In his final despatch from South Africa in June 1902, the commander-in-chief (C-in-C), Major General Lord Kitchener described Maxwell as an officer with "an energetic mind, and a sound judgment, which, coupled with his kindly and considerate disposition, have enabled him to render valuable service". For his service in the war, he was appointed a Knight Commander of the Order of the Bath (KCB) in the April 1901 South African Honours list (the order was dated to 29 November 1900) and a Companion of the Order of St Michael and St George (CMG) in the 1902 Coronation Honours list, and was invested with both orders by King Edward VII at Buckingham Palace on 24 October 1902.

== Inter-war years ==
After his return, Maxwell was in November 1902 appointed chief staff officer of the Third Army Corps, then stationed in Ireland, with promotion to the substantive rank of colonel but to hold the temporary rank of brigadier general on the staff. In August 1903 he was made a Commander of the Royal Victorian Order (CVO) for assisting with King Edward VII's 1903 visit to Ireland. In May 1904 he was made staff officer to the inspector general of the forces, and was allowed to retain his brigadier general's rank while employed. Maxwell accompanied Prince Arthur, Duke of Connaught to Coburg for the coming-of-age celebrations of Charles Edward, Duke of Saxe-Coburg and Gotha, in July 1905, and in September 1906 visited Silesia to observe the manoeuvres of the Imperial German Army before continuing on to Baden. He was promoted to major general in December 1906. In September 1907 they visited Vienna to review the Duke's Austrian regiment, where he was awarded the Grand Cross of the Order of Franz Joseph. In December 1907 he was made a major general, general staff.

He became GOC British Troops in Egypt in 1908, was promoted to lieutenant general in August 1912, and, from January 1914, was colonel of the Black Watch, in succession to Lieutenant General Sir John Chetham McLeod.

== First World War ==
He was deployed on the Western Front at the start of the First World War two years later.

He returned to the Egyptian Command in late 1914. On November 2, 1914, after the Ottoman Empire entered the war, Maxwell announced measures censoring the press in Egypt, causing a paucity in the Arabic press as many Arabic periodicals, such as Ahmed Lutfi es-Sayed's Al Jarida, dwindled or ceased publication. He successfully held the Suez Canal against the Ottoman Raid on the Suez Canal.

In September 1915 Major General Alexander Godley at Gallipoli complained that too few of the recovered sick or wounded casualties from Gallipoli were being returned from Egypt, and Maxwell commented to Godley that "the appetite of the Dardanelles for men has been phenomenal and wicked".

=== Easter Rising ===
After the Easter Rising, a rebellion against British rule in Ireland, broke out on 24 April 1916, Lord Lieutenant of Ireland Lord Wimborne declared both the city and county of Dublin to be in a state of martial law. Concurrently, the British government implemented measures to allow for the court-martial of persons in Ireland found to be breaching the Defence of the Realm Act (DORA), which was passed in the British Parliament on 8 August 1914. Maxwell, who had been promoted to temporary general on 28 January 1916, arrived in Dublin on 28 April, replacing Lovick Friend as Commander-in-Chief, Ireland, and arriving just in time to accept the surrender by the rebels. Granted plenary powers by his superiors, Maxwell was made temporary military governor of Ireland and publicly proclaimed his intent "to arrest all dangerous Sinn Feiners", including "those who have taken an active part in the movement although not in the present rebellion."

3,430 men and 79 women were arrested, including 425 people for looting. Courts-martial presided over by Charles Blackader began on 2 May, in which 187 people were tried, most of them at Richmond Barracks. Controversially, Maxwell decided that the courts-martial would be held in camera and without a defence counsel or jury, which Crown law officers later ruled to have been illegal. Some of those officers who conducted the trials had commanded troops involved in suppressing the rebellion, a conflict of interest that the British Military Manual prohibited. Ninety were sentenced to death; fifteen of those (including all seven signatories of the Proclamation) had their sentences confirmed by Maxwell and fourteen were executed by firing squad at Kilmainham Gaol between 3 and 12 May.

The British prime minister, H. H. Asquith, and his cabinet soon became concerned with the speed and secrecy of events, and intervened to stop more executions. There was concern that DORA regulations for courts-martial were not being applied. These regulations called for a full court of thirteen members, a professional judge, a legal advocate, and for the proceedings to be held in public, provisions which could have prevented some of the executions. Maxwell admitted in a report to Asquith in June that the impression that the leaders were killed in cold blood and without a trial had resulted in a "revulsion of feeling" that had emerged in favour of the rebels, and was the result of the confusion between applying DORA as opposed to martial law (which Maxwell had actually pressed for from the beginning). Maxwell had the remaining death sentences commuted to penal servitude. Although Asquith had promised to publish the court martial proceedings, the transcripts were not made public until 1999.

In late May, Maxwell persuaded the government in Westminster to have Captain John Bowen-Colthurst tried for the murders of Thomas Dickson, Patrick MacIntyre and Francis Sheehy-Skeffington by court martial rather than by civil court. For this trial, the official transcript was never published, but the court martial was held in open court.

This was Maxwell's last posting in Ireland as he left for England later in 1916.

== Post–1916 ==
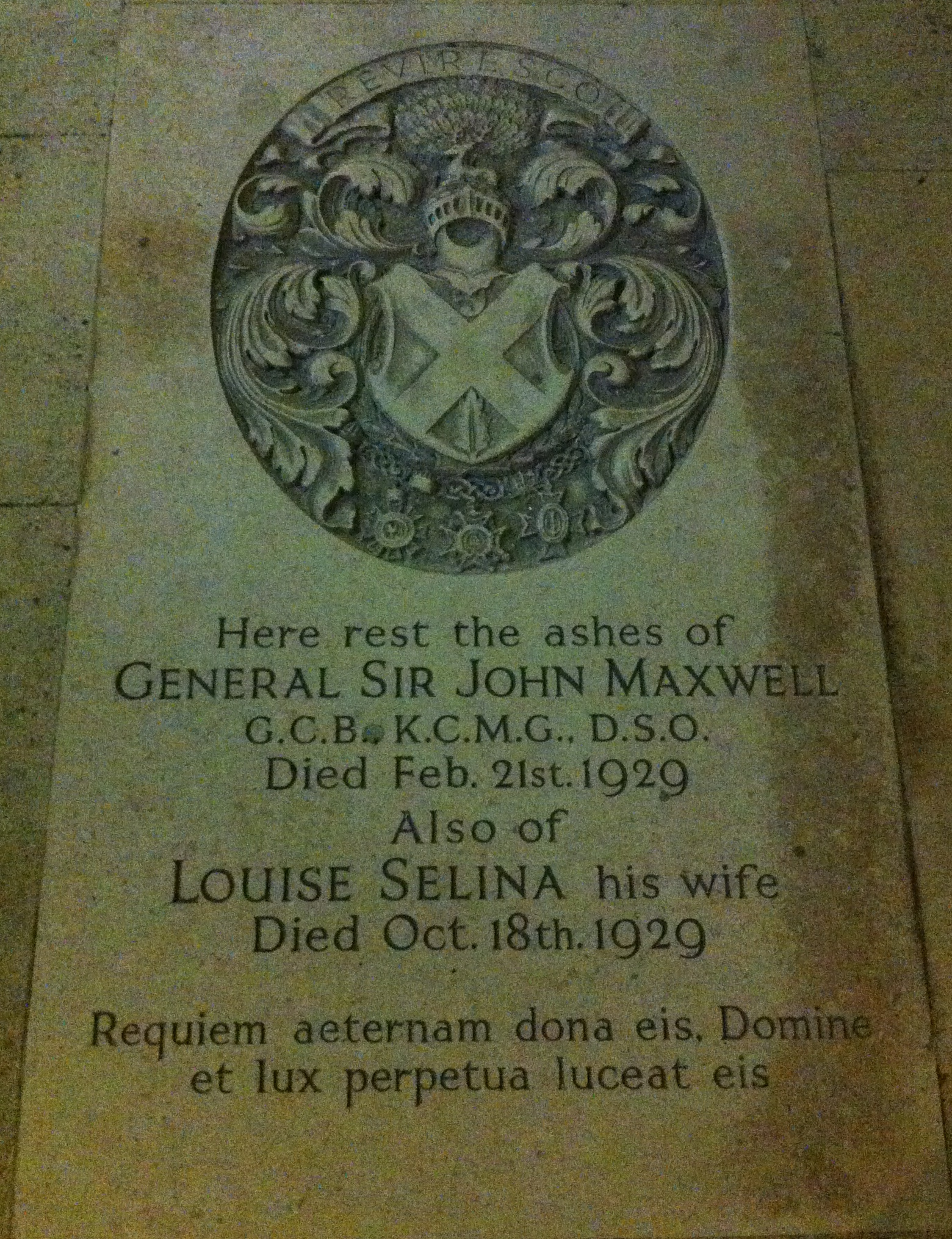
Memorial to General Sir John Maxwell and Louise Selina Maxwell in the crypt at York Minster.

In 1916 Maxwell was assigned to be General Officer Commanding, Northern Command, at York. He was promoted in June 1919 to full general and he retired from the army in 1922.

He died at the age of 69 on 21 February 1929 and his memorial is in the crypt of York Minster where his remains are buried.

== Personal life ==
Maxwell married in 1892 Louisa Selina Bonynge, daughter of Charles Bonynge, and had one daughter.

William Manchester's biography of Winston Churchill says Churchill's mother, the storied Jennie, Lady Randolph Churchill, who had many lovers, and Lady Maxwell each had affairs with the same British Army officer, Major Caryl John Ramsden, in Cairo, Egypt, in 1898. Jennie, who had been staying with Ramdsen in a hotel in Cairo, found him in bed with Lady Maxwell when she returned unexpectedly. Jennie immediately ended her relationship with Ramsden, to the amusement of one of the most famous of her lovers, the Prince of Wales, later King Edward VII. The Prince sent her a teasing note: "You had better have stuck to your old friends than gone on your Expedition to the Nile! Old friends are the best!"

During his time in Egypt, Maxwell developed an interest in archaeology. He was a member of the Egypt Exploration Society, becoming its president after he retired from the army. Through the Society, Maxwell knew Lord Carnarvon and was an executor of his will. In this capacity, Maxwell advised Lady Carnarvon on taking on her late husband's concession to excavate Tutankhamun's tomb, and advised both her and Howard Carter on the management of various legal disputes with the Egyptian authorities.

== Legacy ==
After 1916, the German medallist Walther Eberbach issued a satirical medal mocking Maxwell's handling of the Rising.

On 16 March 1929, Maxwell's ashes were placed in the crypt in York Minster. His body was cremated in London but because he served as a general for the Northern Command at York, it was thought that York was the best resting place for the soldier. His ashes were placed in an urn, the urn was placed into a casket and the casket was placed into a bigger casket to act as a coffin. His ashes were taken by train from London to York and were escorted by military personnel to York Minster. The casket containing his ashes was placed in a cavity in the ground in front of the crypt altar. The ceremony was officiated by the Dean of York, Lionel Ford. This was the first time such a ceremony had taken place in York Minster.

In May 2011 Maxwell's orders and medals were auctioned by Dix Noonan Webb in London, realising £26,000 to an unnamed bidder.

== Bibliography ==
Military offices
Preceded by George Bullock	General Officer Commanding the British Troops in Egypt; 1908–1912	Succeeded by Julian Byng
Preceded by Julian Byng	General Officer Commanding the British Troops in Egypt; 1914–1915	Succeeded by Sir Charles Monro
Preceded by Sir Lovick Friend	Commander-in-Chief, Ireland; April 1916 – November 1916	Succeeded by Sir Bryan Mahon
Preceded by Sir Henry Lawson	GOC-in-C Northern Command; 1916–1919	Succeeded by Sir Ivor Maxse
