= Strategic War Game of 1905 =

The Strategic War Game of 1905 was a wargame run by the British General Staff between January and May 1905. The game was umpired by James Grierson, an expert on the German Army. There were three sides: Colonel Charles Edward Callwell played the British commander-in-chief, William Robertson played the German commander-in-chief with Arthur Lynden-Bell playing that of the Belgian Army. Grierson had been the British military attaché to Berlin from 1896 to 1900, where he had had experience of their Kriegsspiel.

The scenario was:

"War had broken out between France and Germany on 1 January 1905. At this time neither side had the help of allies. Germany had taken the initiative with an offensive against the French defences between Sedan and Belfort; but after two months when these attacks had failed, had decided to outflank the French by passing north through Belgium with six Army Corps, three cavalry divisions, and two Reserve Army Corps... it was assumed that Britain would be brought into the war by this violation of Belgian neutrality."

The rules from the 1896 British Wargame were adapted and German cycling maps of Belgium were used to ensure detailed knowledge of even small roads. The game ran from 1 January 1905 to 24 May 1905.

== Consequences ==
The game gave insight to the General Staff when the Prime Minister, Arthur Balfour posed three questions:

1. If Germany or France violated Belgian territory, what advantages might they get? Very likely Germany would violate neutrality for strategic reasons.
2. What level of effective opposition could be expected from Belgian army in the event of German invasion? Limited capacity for sustained resistance by themselves.
3. How long would it take to deploy two British Army Corps on the Continent? 23 days.

Following the Algeciras Conference, in 1906, the British and French General Staffs started organising joint planning sessions.

== Bibliography ==
- Wilson, Andrew (1968). The Bomb and the Computer. London: Barry & Rockliff.
