= Rivey Hill =

Hill in Cambridgeshire, England

Coordinates: 52.10813°N 0.28676°E

Highest point
- Elevation: 367 ft (112 m)
- Prominence: 69 ft (21 m)
- Listing: (none)

Geography
- Location: Cambridgeshire, England
- OS grid: TL567480
- Topo map: OS Landranger 154

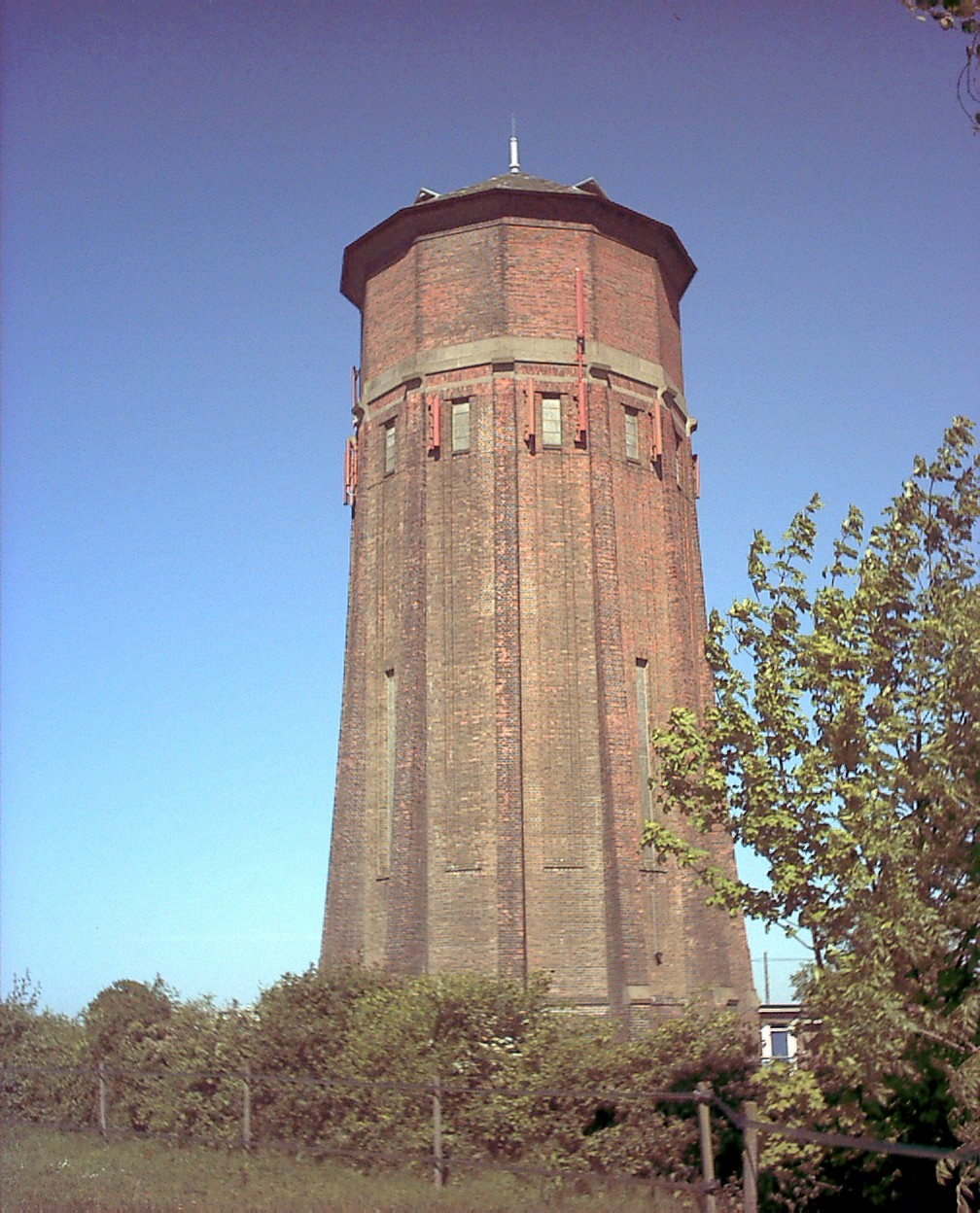
The watertower on Rivey Hill

Rivey Hill is a hill overlooking Linton in Cambridgeshire, England (grid reference TL567480). At 367 feet (112 m) it is the highest point for several miles around. The hill has a steep slope leading down to Linton and a prominence of 69 feet (21 m). The highest point is on private land but a bridleway from Linton crosses near the top. A water tower on the hill identifies it when seen from a distance. The tower is a grade II listed building, was built in 1935–1936 in Art Deco style, and underwent major restoration work in 2018–2019.

The ascent of the hill is the start of a circular walk, detailed in Jarrold's Walks in Cambridgeshire, which goes north from the top to a Roman Road, follows this over the 312 feet (95 m) Hildersham Hill for 2 miles (3.2 km), then descends to Hildersham and returns along the valley of the River Granta to Linton. Rivey Hill is also the highest point on a circular walk around Hadstock and Linton, described by The Hundred Parishes Society.

== See also ==
- Army Manoeuvres of 1912
