= George Lawson (physician) =

English surgeon

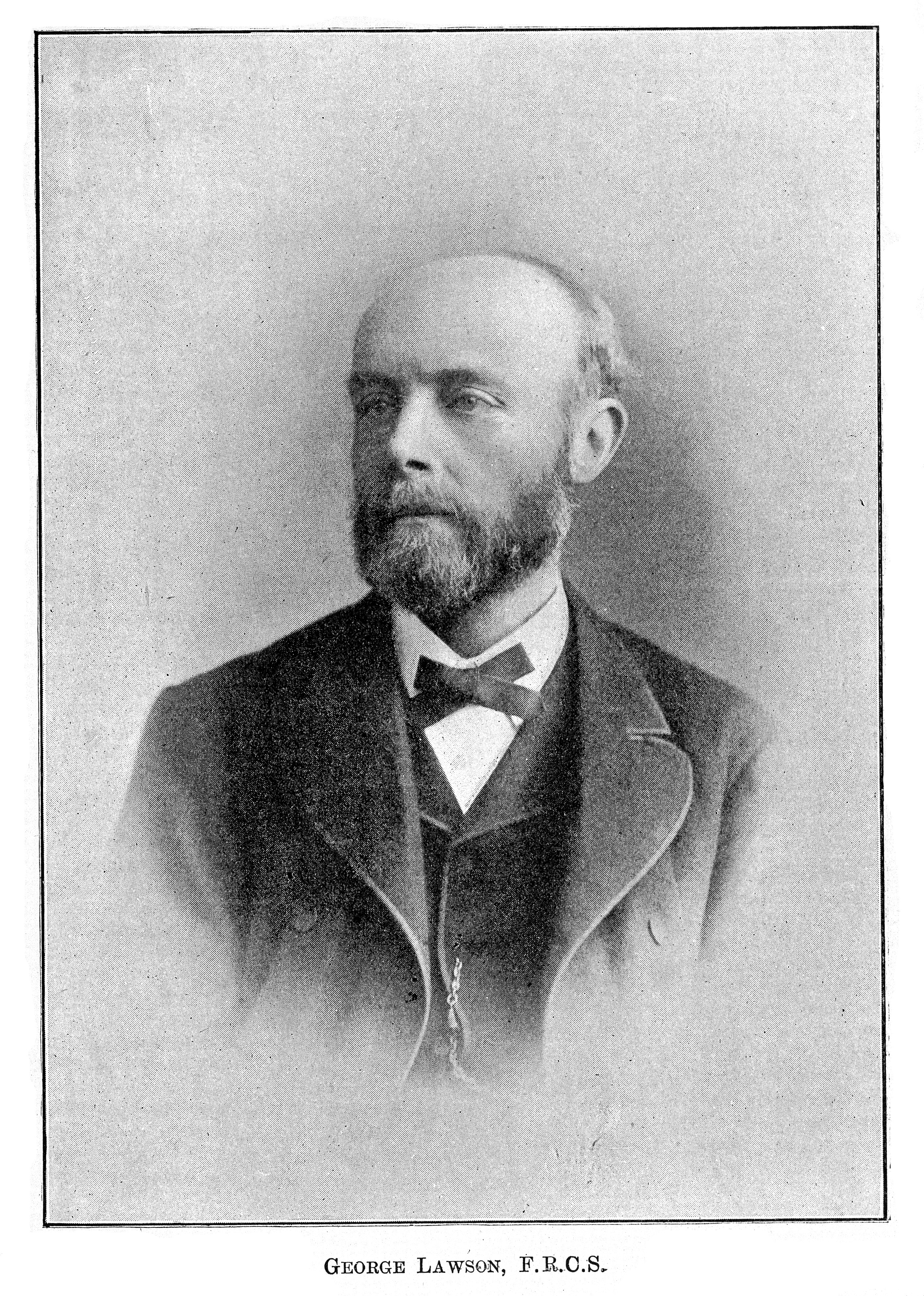
- Born: 23 August 1831
- Died: 12 October 1903 (aged 72)
- Occupation: Surgeon

George Lawson (23 August 1831 – 12 October 1903) was an English ophthalmic surgeon.

== Biography ==
Lawson was born in London on 23 August 1831. He was the second son of William Lawson of the firm of Trower, Trower and Lawson, wine merchants, of the City of London, by his wife Anne Norton. After education at the Blackheath proprietary school, he entered King's College Hospital in 1848. Admitted M.R.C.S. in 1852, he served for a year as house surgeon to Sir William Fergusson. In 1852 he became a licentiate in midwifery of the College of Surgeons and licentiate of the Society of Apothecaries. Early in 1854 Lawson entered the army as an assistant surgeon, and in March of that year he left England with the first draft of troops for Malta. On the outbreak of the Crimean war he was detailed for duty at Varna with the third division under General Sir Richard England; from Varna he went to the Crimea and saw the first shot fired at Bulganak. He was present at the battles of Alma and Inkerman and was sent to Balaclava about the middle of January 1855. He had a severe attack of typhus fever in May 1855, followed by complete paraplegia. Although he had been gazetted assistant surgeon to the third battalion of the rifle brigade he was invalided home and at the end of the war he resigned his commission.

Lawson then decided to practise in London. Elected F.R.C.S. in 1857, he settled at 63 Park Street, Grosvenor Square, and turned his attention more especially to ophthalmic surgery, probably at the suggestion of Sir William Bowman, who had been assistant surgeon at King's College Hospital whilst Lawson acted as house surgeon. Becoming clinical assistant to Bowman at the Royal London Ophthalmic Hospital, Moorfields, he was in 1862 elected surgeon to the hospital on the retirement of Alfred Poland, was appointed full surgeon in 1867 and consulting surgeon in 1891. He held the post of surgeon to the Great Northern Hospital for a short time. To the Middlesex Hospital he was elected assistant surgeon in 1863, surgeon in 1871, lecturer on surgery in 1878, and consulting surgeon in 1896. He served as a member of the council of the College of Surgeons from 1884 to 1892, and in 1886 was appointed surgeon-oculist to Queen Victoria. He died in London on 12 October 1903, and was buried at Hildenborough, Kent. He married, on 5 March 1863, Mary, daughter of William Thomson, of the Indian medical service, by whom he had seven sons.

Lawson practised ophthalmic surgery as a part of general surgery and was little affected by the tendency towards specialism which completely divorced the two subjects before his death.

His works are:

- ‘Injuries of the Eye, Orbit and Eyelids; their immediate and remote effects,’ 1867.
- ‘Diseases and Injuries of the Eye; their medical and surgical treatment,’ 1869; 6th edit. 1903.
