= Commander-in-Chief, Ireland =

Commander of British Forces in Ireland before 1922

Commander-in-Chief, Ireland, was title of the commander of the British forces in Ireland before 1922. Until the Act of Union in 1800, the position involved command of the distinct Irish Army of the Kingdom of Ireland.

== History ==
=== Marshal of Ireland ===
The title Marshal of Ireland was awarded to William Marshal, 1st Earl of Pembroke after the Norman conquest of Ireland and was inherited by his nephew John Marshal and descendants. This hereditary ceremonial title is latterly called Earl Marshal of Ireland to distinguish it from the later non-hereditary military appointment of Marshal of Ireland or Marshal of the Army. Holders of the latter appointment by letters patent included:

- William Brereton (1540)
- Sir Francis Bryan (November 1548)
- Sir Nicholas Bagenal (March 1547–1553; October 1565–October 1590) In 1553 deprived by Mary I. In 1566 failed to sell the office to Thomas Stukley
- Walter Devereux, 1st Earl of Essex (1569 "high marshal"; 1576 "earl marshal" for life)
- Henry Bagenal (from 24 October 1590) son of Nicholas, secured the succession in 1583
- Sir Richard Bingham (1598)
- Edward Conway, 2nd Viscount Conway (31 January 1640; patent 2 April 1640)
- Sir Henry Tichborne (1660)

=== From 1700 ===
In the 18th and 19th centuries the British forces in Ireland were commanded by the Commander-in-Chief, Ireland. In January 1876 a ‘Mobilization Scheme for the forces in Great Britain and Ireland’ was published, with the ‘Active Army’ divided into eight army corps based on the District Commands. 4th Corps was to be formed within Irish Command, based in Dublin. This scheme disappeared in 1881, when the districts were retitled ‘District Commands.

The 1901 Army Estimates introduced by St John Brodrick allowed for six army corps based on six regional commands. As outlined in a paper published in 1903, III Corps was to be formed in a reconstituted Irish Command, with headquarters at Dublin. Field Marshal The Duke of Connaught was appointed acting General Officer Commanding-in-Chief (GOCinC) of III Corps in October 1901. The title was withdrawn in 1904.

Army Order No 324, issued on 21 August 1914, authorised the formation of a 'New Army' of six Divisions, composed of volunteers who had responded to Earl Kitchener's appeal (hence the First New Army was known as 'K1'). Each division was to be under the administration of one of the Home Commands, and Irish Command formed what became the 10th (Irish) Division. It was followed by 16th (Irish) Division of K2 in September 1914.

In the Republic of Ireland, the "supreme command of the Defence Forces" is formally vested in the President of Ireland under the Constitution. The Chief of Staff is the senior officer. In Northern Ireland from 1922 to 2009, the senior British military appointment was General Officer Commanding Northern Ireland.

== Commanders-in-Chief, Ireland, 1700–1922 ==
Holders of the post have included:

- Lieutenant General Thomas Erle 1701–1705
- Lieutenant General John Cutts, 1st Baron Cutts 1705– January 1707;
- Lieutenant General Richard Ingoldsby February 1707–January 1712;
- General William Steuart 1711–1714
- Lieutenant General Charles O'Hara, 1st Baron Tyrawley 1714–1721
- Field Marshal Richard Boyle, 2nd Viscount Shannon 1721–1740
- Lieutenant-General Owen Wynne in 1728
- General Gervais Parker 1740–1750
- Field Marshal Richard Molesworth, 3rd Viscount Molesworth 1751–1758
- General Lord Rothes 1758–1767
- Lieutenant General William Keppel 1773–1774
- General George Eliott 1774–1775
- General Sir John Irwin 1775–1782
- Lieutenant-General John Burgoyne 1782–1784
- Lieutenant-General Sir William Augustus Pitt 1784–1791
- Lieutenant-General George Warde 1791–1793
- General Robert Cuninghame 1793–1796
- Lieutenant-General Henry Luttrell, 2nd Earl of Carhampton 1796–1797
- Lieutenant-General Sir Ralph Abercromby 1797–1798
- Lieutenant-General Gerard Lake 1798
- General Charles Cornwallis, 1st Marquess Cornwallis 1798–1801
- General Sir William Medows 1801–1803
- Lieutenant-General Henry Edward Fox 1803
- Lieutenant-General William Cathcart, 10th Baron Cathcart 1803–1805
- Lieutenant-General John Floyd 1805
- General Charles Stanhope, 3rd Earl of Harrington 1805–1812
- Lieutenant-General Sir John Hope 1812–1813
- General Sir George Hewett, 1st Baronet 1813–1816
- General Sir George Beckwith 1816–1820
- General Sir David Baird, 1st Baronet 1820–1822
- General Sir Samuel Auchmuty 1822
- Field Marshal Stapleton Cotton, 1st Viscount Combermere 1822–1825
- General Sir George Murray 1825–1828
- Field Marshal John Byng, 1st Baron Strafford 1828–1831
- Lieutenant-General Hussey Vivian, 1st Baron Vivian 1831–1836
- Field Marshal Sir Edward Blakeney 1836–1855
- Field Marshal John Colborne, 1st Baron Seaton 1855–1860
- General Sir George Brown 1860–1865
- Field Marshal Hugh Rose, 1st Baron Strathnairn 1865–1870
- General William Mansfield, 1st Baron Sandhurst 1870–1875
- Field Marshal Sir John Michel 1875–1880
- General Sir Thomas Steele 1880–1885
- Field Marshal Prince Edward of Saxe-Weimar 1885–1890
- Field Marshal Garnet Wolseley, 1st Viscount Wolseley 1890–1895
- Field Marshal Frederick Roberts, 1st Earl Roberts 1895–1900
- Field Marshal Prince Arthur, Duke of Connaught and Strathearn 1900–1904
  - December 1902–March 1903: Major-General Sir Hugh McCalmont (acting while the Duke of Connaught was on a tour of India)
- Field Marshal Francis Grenfell, 1st Baron Grenfell 1904–1908
- General Sir Neville Lyttelton 1908–1912
- General Sir Arthur Paget 1912–1914
- Major-General Sir Lovick Friend 1914–1916
- General Sir John Maxwell 1916
- Lieutenant-General Sir Bryan Mahon 1916–1918
- Lieutenant-General Sir Frederick Shaw 1918–1920
- General Sir Nevil Macready 1920–1922
