= Lovick Friend =

British Army major general (1856–1944)

Major-General The Right Honourable Sir Lovick Friend KBE CB
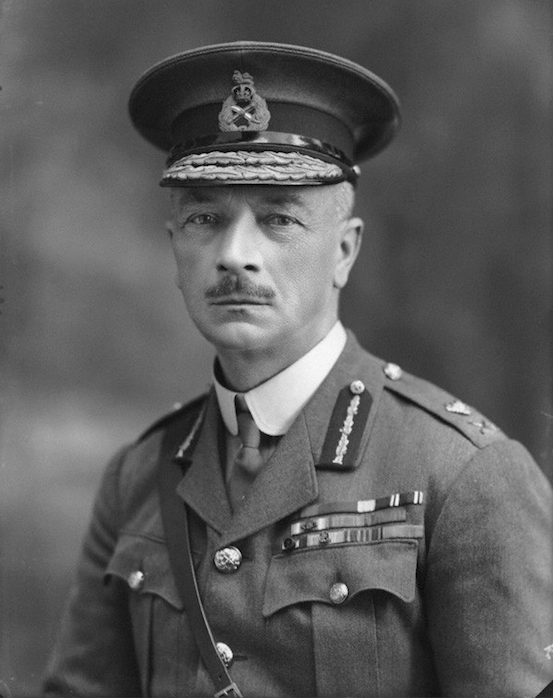
- Friend photographed in 1920
- Born: 25 April 1856; Halfay Street, Sidcup, Kent, England
- Died: 19 November 1944 (aged 88); West Kensington, London, England
- Military career
- Allegiance: United Kingdom
- Branch: British Army
- Service years: 1874–1920
- Rank: Major-General
- Unit: Royal Engineers
- Commands: Ireland
- Conflicts: Mahdist War; First World War; Easter Rising
- Awards: Knight Commander of the Order of the British Empire; Companion of the Order of the Bath
- Cricket career

Cricket information
- Batting: Right-handed
- Role: Wicket-keeper

Domestic team information
- Years: Team
- 1873–1897: Royal Engineers
- 1886–1887: Kent
- FC debut: 8 July 1886 Kent v Sussex
- Last FC: 15 June 1891 Marylebone Cricket Club (MCC) v Kent
- Source: CricketArchive, 18 June 2022

Major-General Sir Lovick Bransby Friend KBE CB (25 April 1856 – 19 November 1944) was a British Army major general and amateur sportsman. He served with the Royal Engineers and was Commander-in-Chief, Ireland, during the 1916 Easter Rising. As a sportsman, Friend played in goal for the Royal Engineers in the 1878 FA Cup Final and as a wicket-keeper in first-class cricket for Kent County Cricket Club.

== Early life ==
Friend was born at Halfway Street near Sidcup in Kent in 1856, the fourth son of wealthy merchant Frederick Friend and his wife Fanny (née Tyrell). He grew up at the family home, Woollett Hall at North Cray, and was educated at Cheltenham College and the Royal Military Academy, Woolwich. He was a mathematics scholar at Cheltenham and was awarded the Dobson Scholarship and the Cheltonian Society Prize in 1872, his final year at school. Although his Times obituary said that he was "proficient in all games, at cricket being exceptionally good", he did not play for the College XI, despite showing what his Wisden obituary described as "good batting form".

== Military career ==
Friend won a prize for artillery whilst at the Woolwich and was commissioned into the Royal Engineers in 1874 as a Temporary Lieutenant. His commission was made permanent in 1876 and he spent time stationed in Ireland and Hong Kong before being appointed as an instructor at the Royal Military College, Sandhurst, in 1883 and promoted to captain in 1885.

In 1885 he was made Secretary of the Royal Engineers Experimental Committee and served in the British West Indies, training the West Indies Fortress Company, before being promoted to major in 1893. He was posted to Egypt in 1897 and served as a staff officer in charge of organising supplies during the Anglo-Egyptian invasion of Sudan in 1898 before being attached to the Intelligence Department before the Battle of Omdurman where he was an aide to Sir Herbert Kitchener, the commander in chief of British forces. He was mentioned in dispatches after the battle and received the Khedive's Sudan Medal and Queen's Sudan Medal as well as the Order of Osmanieh, fourth class.

He was Director of Works and Stores for the Egyptian Army from 1900 to 1904, during which he received the Order of Medjidie, third class. He subsequently held a variety of roles both in Egypt and in Britain in the years before the First World War. Promotions continued and Friend rose to the rank of major general in June 1912. He was appointed Major-General in charge of Administration at Irish Command in 1912 and succeeded Sir Arthur Paget as Commander-in-Chief, Ireland, in 1914 the year the First World War began in Europe. He became a member of the Privy Council of Ireland in January 1916.

Friend was in command in Ireland when the Easter Rising broke out in 1916. In the lead up to the Rising he was in command during the capture of the arms ship Aud and the arrest of Roger Casement on 21 April, but went on leave to England after the arrest, apparently "satisfied that the danger had passed". When the Rising began on 24 April, Friend returned to Dublin and he received the surrender of the rebel leaders. Although The Times wrote that he had "firmly handled" the Rising, his decision to leave Ireland in advance was seen as an error of judgement and he was replaced by Sir John Maxwell, although he was not criticised in the Royal Commission which examined the conduct of British officials leading up to the Rising.

From 1916 until his retirement in 1921 Friend was President of the Claims Commission of the British Armies in France. He was awarded the Ordre de Léopold, Legion d'Honneur and Croix de Guerre for his role and in 1919 was made KBE and mentioned in despatches for a fourth time in his career, his organisational skills being praised by Sir Douglas Haig. He was placed on retirement pay in June 1920 after 47 years of military service, although he continued to serve as Chairman of the French Committee of the Disposal Board.

== Sporting career ==
Friend played cricket for the Royal Military Academy, Woolwich and then regularly for the Royal Engineers Cricket Club after he was commissioned in 1873. He was one of the club's most prolific batsmen in its history and served as its secretary for many years. He was described in his Wisden obituary as a "good wicket-keeper", and scored 10 centuries for the RE, his first in 1877 and five during the 1885 season alone. In 1885 he made 198 runs against Band of Brothers, who included Lord Harris, a key administrator and the captain of Kent County Cricket Club at the time. Friend made his first-class cricket debut for Kent during the following season, playing against Sussex at Hove.

In total Friend played six first-class matches, scoring 189 runs at an average of 17.18 runs per innings. He played twice more for Kent in 1887 as well as appearing for I Zingari against the Gentlemen of England the same year. In 1888 he played for the Gentlemen of England against Oxford University, making his highest first-class score of 72 runs, and his final first-class appearance was for Marylebone Cricket Club (MCC) against Kent at Lord's in 1891. He played Army and club cricket, making his highest score of 208 for United Services Portsmouth in 1897, the last year he played for the RE. Whilst serving in the Far East he played for Hong Kong Cricket Club in 1880. He played for South Northumberland and Northumberland between 1887 and 1891 whilst stationed at Newcastle-upon-Tyne and such as Free Foresters and United Services.

Friend played association football for Royal Engineers. Described as "always cool and a sure kick", he played in goal for the team in the 1878 FA Cup Final.

== Later life ==
Friend spent time during his retirement in South Africa and Australia. He died in a nursing home at West Kensington in London on 19 November 1944 aged 88.

== Bibliography ==
- Carlaw, Derek (2020). Kent County Cricketers, A to Z: Part One (1806–1914) (PDF). Cardiff: ACS.

Military offices
Preceded by Arthur Paget	Commander-in-Chief, Ireland; 1914–1916	Succeeded by John Maxwell
