= Victor Bonham-Carter =

English author, farmer and publisher

Victor Bonham-Carter (13 December 1913 – 13 March 2007) was an English author, farmer and publisher.

== Early life ==
Born into the prominent Bonham Carter family, he was the son of General Sir Charles Bonham-Carter, who was Governor of Malta (1936–1940), and he was educated at Winchester College and Magdalene College, Cambridge, where he studied modern languages and rural economics. After graduating, he worked for The Countryman and from 1937 he was a director of School Prints Ltd. During the Second World War, Bonham-Carter joined the Royal Berkshire Regiment and was seconded to the Intelligence Corps, which was based in the War Office. He returned to School Prints after the war, where he remained until 1960.

== Career ==
He was appointed the historian of Dartington Hall, Devon and his findings were published in Dartington Hall (1958), which he co-authored with W. B. Curry. Bonham-Carter managed a farm in Somerset and he wrote extensively on rural affairs. His 1952 work, The English Village, explored the history of the village. He also composed a textbook for secondary school pupils, Farming the Land (1959). The Survival of the Countryside demonstrated how changes in the use of land damaged the countryside.

During 1963–64 he was a scriptwriter for the BBC television series The Great War.

He also wrote on military history, including biographies of Field-Marshal Sir William Robertson (1965) and George Lawson (1969), a surgeon in the Crimean War.

From 1966 until 1982 he was secretary of the Royal Literary Fund and from 1971 until 1978 he was joint-secretary of the Society of Authors.

== Personal life and death ==
Bonham-Carter married Audrey Stogdon in 1938 and they had two sons. They divorced in 1979. In 1980 he married Cynthia Sanford.

Bonham-Carter died on 13 March 2007, aged 93.

== Works ==
- The English Village (1952)
- Exploring Parish Churches (1959)
- Farming the Land (1959)
- In a Liberal Tradition (1960)
- Soldier True: the life and times of Field-Marshal Sir William Robertson (1965), published in America as The Strategy of Victory 1914-1918
- Surgeon in the Crimea (1969; collection of letters by George Lawson during the Crimean War)
- The Survival of the English Countryside (1971)
- Authors by Profession: Volume One (1978)
- Authors by Profession: Volume Two (1984)
- Exmoor Writers (1987)
- The Essence of Exmoor (1991)
- What Countryman, Sir? (1996; autobiography)
- A Filthy Barren Ground (1998; edited letters of Rev William Thornton)
