= House Grey Memorandum =

U.S. diplomatic proposal in World War I

The House-Grey Memorandum was a memorandum prepared by U.S. President Woodrow Wilson's diplomatic emissary to Europe, "Colonel" Edward M. House, and British Foreign Secretary Sir Edward Grey.

The memorandum, drafted in memo form by Grey, was an invitation from the U.S. to all those involved in the First World War to participation in a U.S.-sponsored peace convention. Wilson aimed to have a role at the peace conference in order to curb the big European powers' ambitions. If the German Empire declined to attend, the U.S. would probably become militarily involved in the European conflict.

Wilson "approved the whole of the agreement", but added the word 'probably'. Grey showed the Memorandum to the French Ambassador Paul Cambon, who believed that the Memorandum was just an election tactic for Wilson who would be standing again for President that year.

The British government, led by Prime Minister H. H. Asquith, vetoed the proposal, as it and its French ally wanted not a return to the status quo ante bellum but a victory over the German Empire.

== Text ==
Confidential 22 February 1916.

Colonel House told me that President Wilson was ready, on hearing from France and England that the moment was opportune, to propose that a Conference should be summoned to put an end to the war.

Should the Allies accept this proposal, and should Germany refuse it, the United States would probably enter the war against Germany.

Colonel House expressed the opinion that, if such a Conference met, it would secure peace on terms not unfavourable to the Allies; and, if it failed to secure peace, the United States would leave the Conference as a belligerent on the side of the Allies, if Germany was unreasonable.

Colonel House expressed an opinion decidedly favourable to the restoration of Belgium, the transfer of Alsace and Lorraine to France, and the acquisition by Russia of an outlet to the sea, though he thought that the loss of territory incurred by Germany in one place would have to be compensated to her by concessions to her in other places outside Europe.

If the Allies delayed accepting the offer of President Wilson, and if, later on, the course of the war was so unfavourable to them that the intervention of the United States would not be effective, the United States would probably disinterest themselves in Europe and look to their own protection in their own way.

I said that I felt the statement, coming from the President of the United States, to be a matter of such importance that I must inform the Prime Minister and my colleagues; but that I could say nothing until it had received their consideration.

The British Government could, under no circumstances accept or make any proposal except in consultation and agreement with the Allies...

(Initialled 'E.G.' by Sir Edward Grey) Foreign Office.
