= No. 47 Squadron RAF =

Royal Air Force flying squadron

- Active: 1 March 1916 – 1 April 1918 (RFC); 1 April 1918 – 7 October 1919 (RAF); 1 February 1920 – 21 March 1946; 1 Sept 1946 – 31 October 1967; 25 Feb 1968 – 21 September 2023
- Country: United Kingdom
- Branch: Royal Air Force
- Type: Flying squadron
- Mottos: Nili nomen roboris omen (Latin for 'The name of the Nile is an omen of our strength')
- Battle honours: Macedonia (1916–1918)*, East Africa (1940–1941)*, Egypt and Libya (1942)*, Mediterranean (1942–1943)*, Burma (1945)*, South Atlantic (1982), Gulf (1991), Iraq (2003–2011)*, Afghanistan (2001–2014)*, Libya (2011)*; Honours marked with an asterisk may be emblazoned on the Squadron Standard

Insignia
- Squadron badge heraldry: In front of a fountain, a demoiselle crane's head erased. The unofficial badge had been a sun rising over a pyramid, but tours in Russia and Sudan inspired the use of a crane (found in both countries) which, when navigating, flies high like a bomber. The fountain commemorates the amphibious role when seaplanes were flown off the River Nile. Approved by King George VI in November 1938.
- Squadron Codes: EW (Apr 1939 – Sep 1939); KU (Sep 1939 – Sep 1942) (Feb 1945 – Mar 1946)

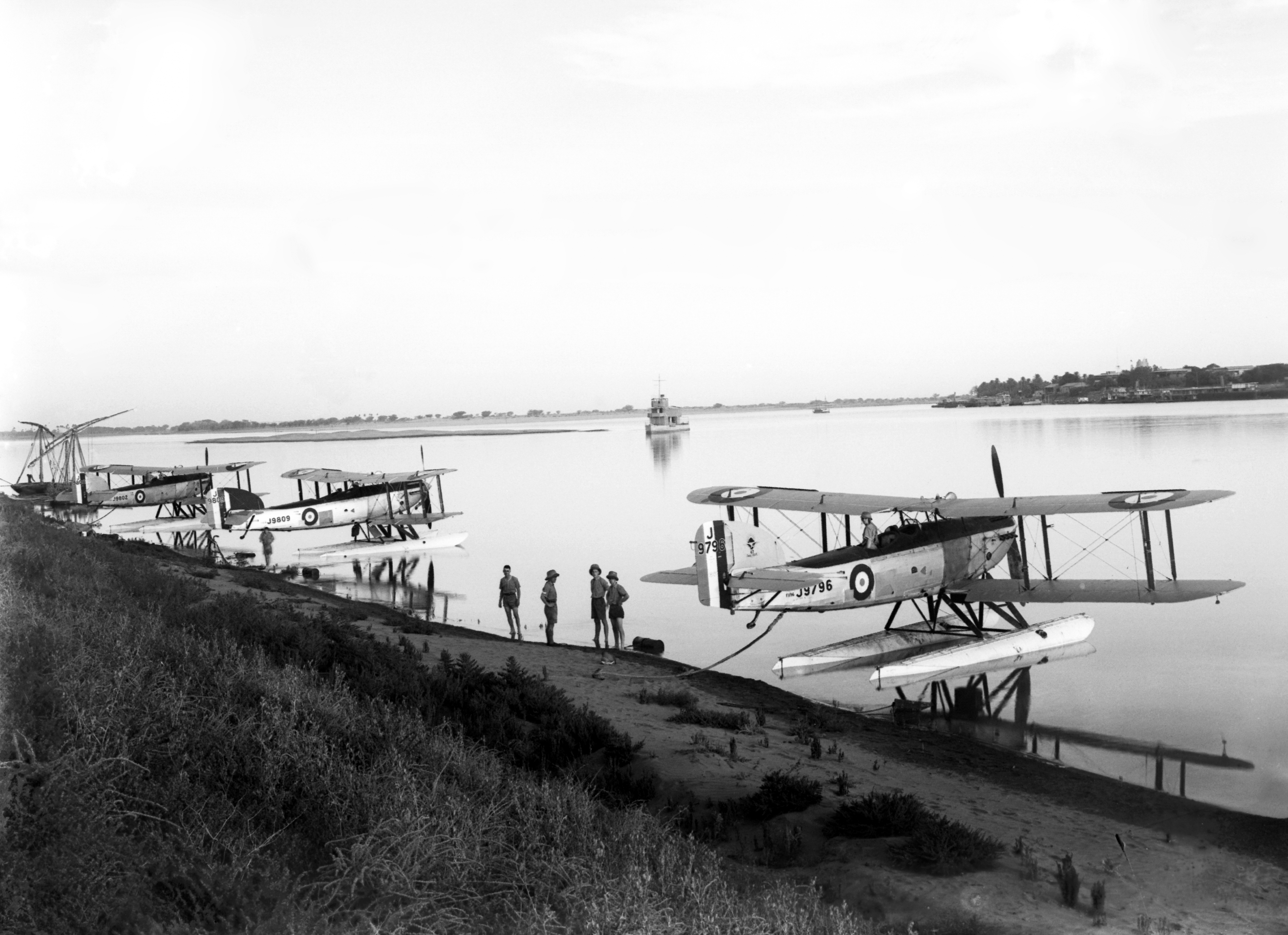
Fairey IIIFs of 47 Squadron on the Blue Nile at Khartoum in 1930

No. 47 Squadron is an inactive squadron of the Royal Air Force. Formed in 1916, it saw service during the First World War in the UK and in Greece. Between the wars it served in Egypt and Sudan, and at the outbreak of the Second World War undertook bombing operations against Italian positions in Eritrea. Later it was based in Libya and Tunisia, taking part in anti-shipping operations in the Mediterranean. In 1944 the squadron moved to India, and began operations against the Japanese in Burma and elsewhere.

After the end of the war, it became a transport squadron, and returned to the United Kingdom. In 1968 it began a long association with the Lockheed Hercules, becoming part of the Lyneham Transport Wing. Subsequently, it was based at RAF Brize Norton, Oxfordshire, until it was disbanded in 2023.

== History ==
=== First World War ===
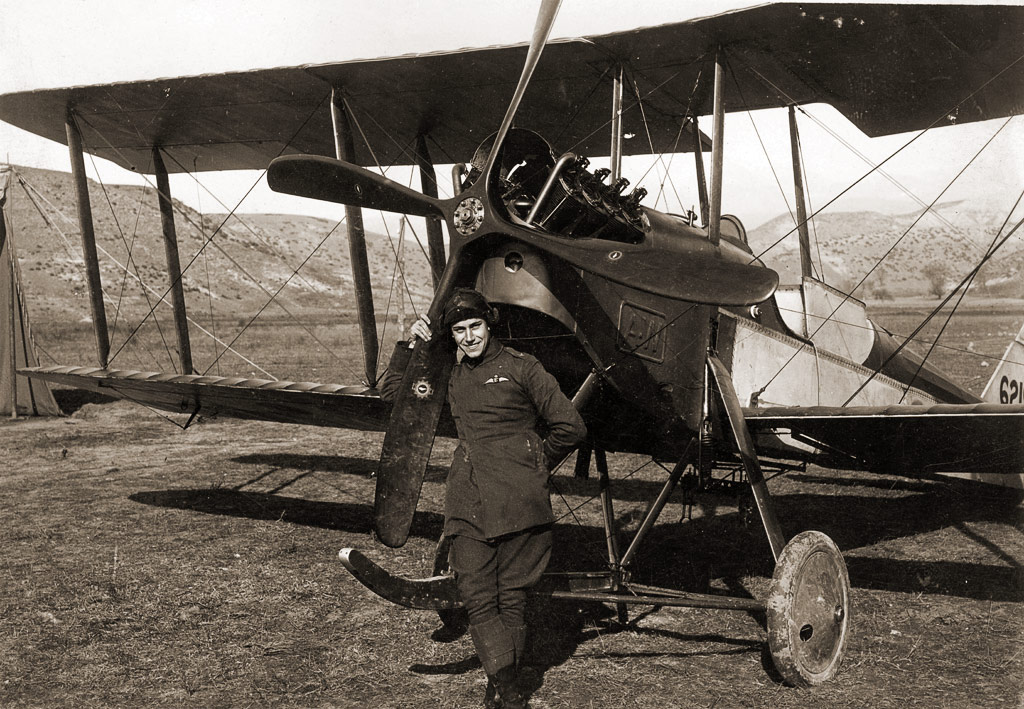
Armstrong-Whitworth F.K.3 – as used by No. 47 Squadron in Thessalonika

No. 47 Squadron Royal Flying Corps was formed at Beverley, East Riding of Yorkshire on 1 March 1916 as a home defence unit, protecting Hull and East Yorkshire against attack by German Zeppelins, being equipped with a mix of aircraft, including Armstrong Whitworth F.K.3s, FK.8s and Royal Aircraft Factory BE.12s. After six months training and flying defensive patrols, the squadron was sent to Salonika in Greece, to support forces fighting on the Macedonian Front, arriving on 20 September 1916, although two flights were left behind in Yorkshire, joining 33 Squadron.

Whilst in Greece, it retained a mixture of aircraft, with two flights being used for reconnaissance and bombing while the third flight operated fighters. When the German battlecruiser Goeben ran aground in the Dardanelles after the Battle of Imbros, three 47 Squadron aircraft were sent to attack the stranded ship. Despite continual attacks from these and other aircraft little damage was done to the Goeben owing to the light bombs used. On 1 April 1918, the Royal Flying Corps became part of the Royal Air Force, and the fighter flights (by now equipped with the Royal Aircraft Factory S.E.5A) of both 47 Squadron and No. 17 Squadron were detached to form 150 Squadron. 47 Squadron, now divested of its fighters, and solely equipped with Armstrong Whitworth F.K.8s, was used mainly in the Corps Reconnaissance role, but were used to bomb the retreating Bulgarian forces following the Allied offensive of September 1918.

=== Interwar ===
After the end of World War I, in April 1919, the squadron was sent to Southern Russia to help General Denikin's White Russian forces in their fight against the Bolsheviks in the Russian Civil War. While the RAF's ostensible mission was purely to provide training to Denikin's forces, No. 47 Squadron was included in the mission in order to carry out operational sorties. It was equipped with a mixture of aircraft, with flights equipped with Airco DH.9 and DH.9A bombers and Sopwith Camel fighters. The squadron's flights operated independently, carrying out bombing and strafing missions against Bolshevik forces. One notable incident occurred on 30 July 1919, when, during an attack by C Flight DH.9s on Bolshevik gunboats at Tcherni-Yar, the DH.9 flown by William Elliot was shot down. On seeing this, the DH.9 flown by Captain Anderson, despite itself receiving damage that required his gunner, Lt Mitchell to climb onto the wing and block a leaking fuel tank with his thumb, landed next to the stricken aircraft to rescue its crew. Anderson and Mitchell were recommended for the Victoria Cross for this action, but in the end they were awarded the Distinguished Service Order. No. 47 Squadron was disbanded on 7 October 1919, being re-designated 'A' Squadron, Royal Air Force Instructional Mission, South Russia.

Although it was not a fighter unit, the squadron did have at least two aces serve in it: Samuel Kinkead and Charles Green.

On 1 February 1920 the squadron was re-formed at RAF Helwan in Egypt when 206 Squadron was re-numbered. It was a day bomber squadron equipped with the DH.9, re-equipping with Airco DH.9As in 1921. One of the duties was policing in Sudan and the squadron detached aircraft to Khartoum. Another important task carried out during the Squadron's early years in Egypt was to help survey and mark out the route of the Cairo to Baghdad air route, and to carry air mail along that route. Between 27 October and 19 November 1925, three aircraft, led by Squadron Leader Arthur Coningham (later an Air Vice Marshal and commander of the Western Desert Air Force during the Second World War), carried out the first RAF round trip flight between Egypt and Kano, Nigeria, covering 6,500 miles in 24 days, with 85 hours flying time.

In October 1927 the squadron moved completely to Khartoum and in December it discarded its aging DH.9As in favour of Fairey IIIFs, becoming the first Squadron to receive this aircraft. The squadron co-operated with the Sudan Defence Force, regularly carrying out border patrols, while a flight of IIIFs was fitted with floats, flying patrols over the River Nile and the Red Sea. It also continued to carry out long range flights, flying from Egypt to The Gambia in 1930, and carrying out four training flights to South Africa. The Squadron replaced its IIIFs with Fairey Gordons (effectively IIIFs powered by a radial engine) in January 1933, continuing its operations in support of the Sudan Defence Force and floatplane patrols over the Red Sea.

In July 1936 the squadron re-equipped with the Vickers Vincent, although some float-equipped Gordons were kept until June 1939. In June 1939 the squadron started to operate the Vickers Wellesley monoplane, retaining a flight of Vincents for Army co-operation purposes.

=== Second World War ===
==== East Africa and the Mediterranean (1939–1944) ====
To counter Italian forces entering the war the squadron moved north to Erkowit and flew its first combat mission of the Second World War against Asmara airfield in Eritrea on 11 June 1940. The Vincent equipped D Flight was split off to form No. 430 Flight in August 1940, that flight continuing in support of Orde Wingate's Gideon Force. In December 1940, 14 Squadron, which had re-equipped with Bristol Blenheims, passed its old Wellesleys on to 47 Squadron, helping to restore the squadron's strength (47 Squadron had already lost 36 Wellesleys to enemy action, accidents or mechanical failure). The squadron was further reinforced in April 1941, when it received Wellesleys from 223 Squadron when that squadron reequipped with Martin Marylands, with 47 Squadron becoming the only Wellesley-equipped unit operating over East Africa. 47 Squadron continued to bomb Italian forces in Eritrea until they surrendered in May 1941, and then flying operations in support of British and Commonwealth forces in Ethiopia, including dropping supplies to allied troops, until the final Italian surrender in Gondar in November 1941.

The squadron moved to Egypt using the now old Wellesleys in anti-submarine patrols in RAF Kasfareet, while in July 1942 it acquired a detachment of Bristol Beaufort torpedo bombers from 42 Squadron. It flew its first anti-shipping strikes against enemy convoys supplying the Afrika Korps in Libya on 8 October 1942. It carried on operating Beauforts on anti-shipping as well as convoy escort duties until 1943. In June 1943 the Squadron, by now based in Tunisia, re-equipped with Bristol Beaufighters. Now better equipped at striking against enemy shipping, they carried out armed reconnaissance in different areas of the Mediterranean and Aegean sea looking for shipping to attack.

==== India and the Far East (1944–1945) ====
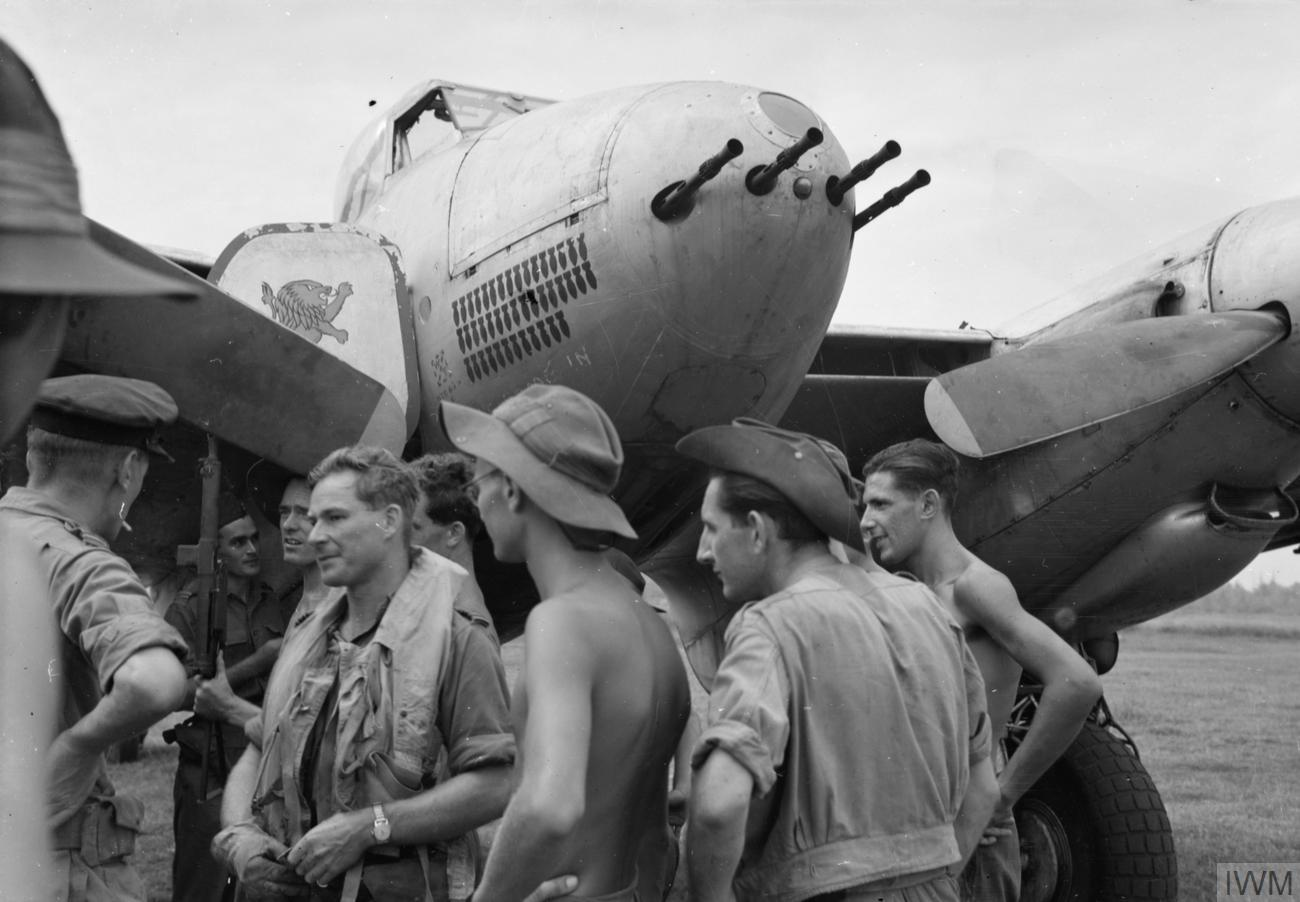
47 Squadron crew at Batavia/Kemajoran airfield after a mission against Indonesian nationalist forces

The squadron moved with the Beaufighters to India in March 1944, re-equipping with de Havilland Mosquitos in October that year. This was not a success as the Mosquito was almost immediately grounded owing to failures of the wooden structure due to the hot and humid Indian climate, and it re-acquired the Beaufighter in November. They were soon supporting operations in Burma in both day and night attacks with rockets. The squadron partly re-equipped with Mosquitos in February 1945, with both its Beaufighters and Mosquitos being heavily used to support General Slim's 14th Army in its attack against Mandalay. It completely re-equipped with Mosquitos in April 1945, continuing operations against Japanese forces until the end of the war. After the war it moved to Java to operate against Indonesian nationalist forces but it was disbanded at Butterworth on 21 March 1946.

=== Transport (1946–1967) ===
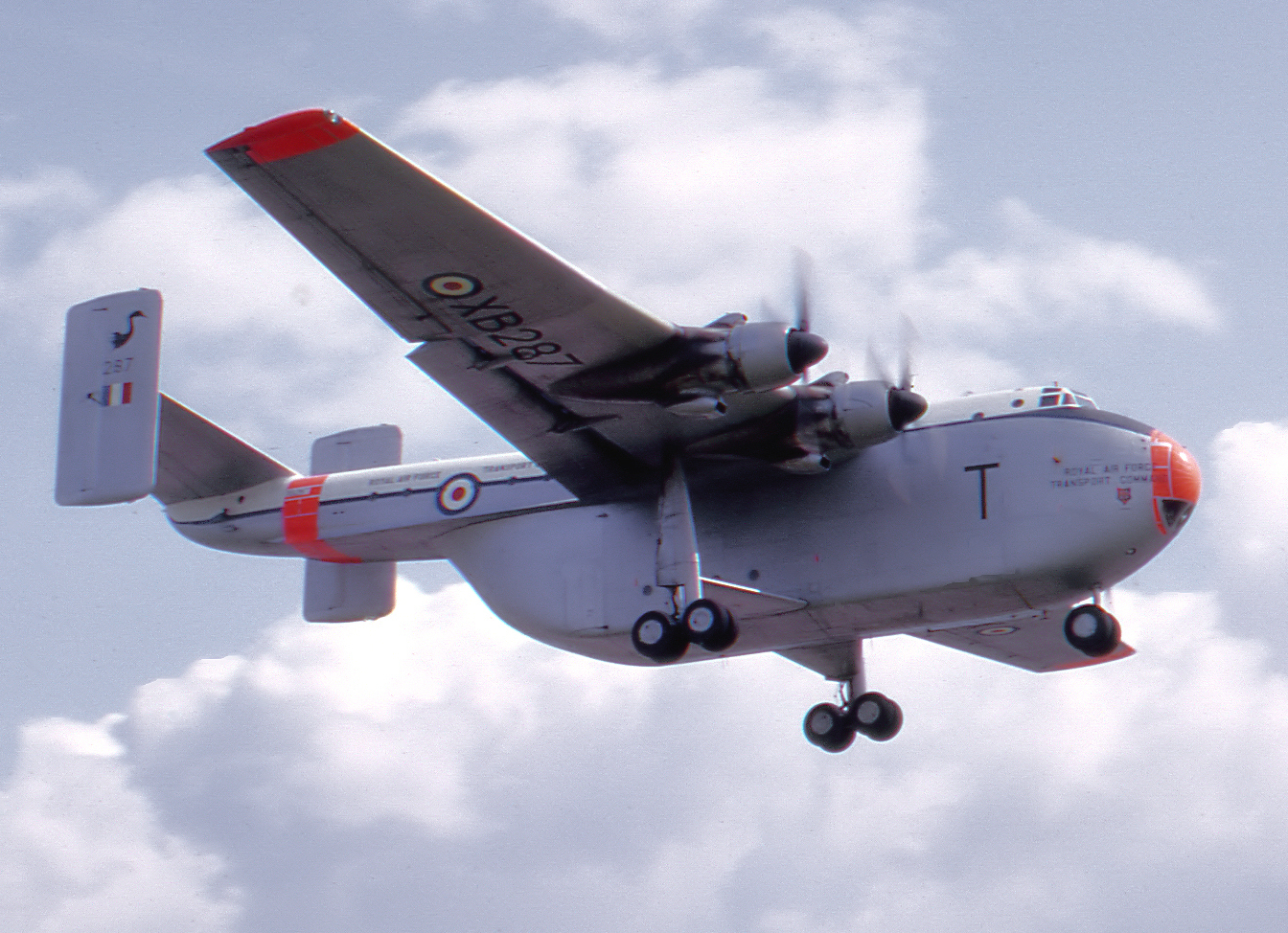
47 Squadron Beverley in 1964

On 1 September 1946 the squadron was re-formed at RAF Qastina in Palestine when 644 Squadron was renumbered. It was now a transport squadron using converted four-engined Handley Page Halifax bombers. It soon returned to the United Kingdom where it flew the Halifax from RAF Fairford in the Army support role. The Squadron moved to RAF Dishforth in September 1948, where it became the first RAF Squadron to receive the Handley Page Hastings four-engined transport. The conversion process was rushed as the aircraft were needed to support the Berlin Airlift, with the Squadron moving to Schleswigland, near Kiel in West Germany on 1 November 1948. The aircraft was mainly used to carry coal, carrying out 3,000 trips to Berlin and carrying 22,000 tons of supplies. When the blockade ended the Squadron returned to the United Kingdom, moving to RAF Topcliffe on 22 August 1949, operating in support of airborne forces, moving to RAF Abingdon in May 1953.

In May 1956 the squadron became the first to re-equip with the Blackburn Beverley heavy-lift transport, the large aircraft were used on Transport Command trooping and freight routes. The squadron also supported operations in Cyprus, Kuwait and East Africa and carried out mercy flights related to floods, droughts and natural disasters. The Beverley was withdrawn and the squadron disbanded on 31 October 1967.

=== Hercules (1968–2023) ===
==== C-130K (1968–2013) ====
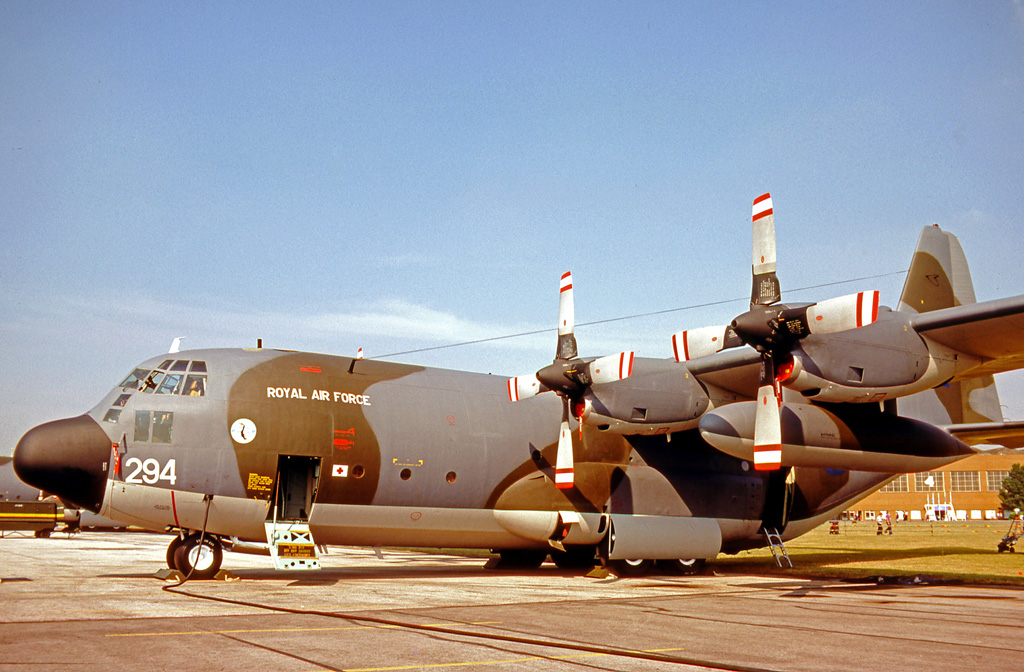
Lockheed Hercules C.1 in 1977 wearing the 47 Squadron Cranes head badge behind its cockpit.

The squadron was re-formed at RAF Fairford, Gloucestershire, on 25 February 1968 to operate the Lockheed C-130K Hercules, moving to RAF Lyneham in September 1971.

During the Falklands War, the squadron airlifted supplies to Ascension Island and, later, air dropped men and supplies to ships of the British task force in the South Atlantic. To make the trip from Ascension to the Falklands, several Hercules were given additional fuel tanks and fitted with refuelling probes. No. 47 Squadron also prepared to fly elements of the Special Air Service to Argentina for the aborted Operation Mikado.

The Hercules C.1/C.3s were withdrawn from service on 28 October 2013.

==== C-130J (1999–2023) ====
No. 47 Squadron received its first Lockheed Martin C-130J Super Hercules on 21 November 1999.

The squadron was subsequently heavily involved in Operation Telic in Iraq in the 2000s and then in Operation Ellamy in Libya in 2011. The squadron moved to RAF Brize Norton in 2011.

On 25 August 2017, Hercules C4 ZH873, operated by the squadron, was seriously damaged in flight operations during Operation Shader. In response to an issue of "crew fatigue" over this incident, the RAF approved an uplift of trained aircrews for the C-130J from 20 to 28.

In March 2020, the squadron was awarded the right to emblazon a new battle honour on its squadron standard, recognising its role in War in Afghanistan between 2001 and 2014.

On 4 June 2023, No. 47 Squadron carried out the RAF's last Hercules operational flight when Hercules C4 ZH871 returned from RAF Akrotiri, Cyprus, to RAF Brize Norton. On 8 June 2023, No. 47 Squadron held its disbandment parade at RAF Brize Norton, in a service led by the Princess Royal, ahead of its official stand down on 21 September 2023 due to the retirement of the Hercules. On 14 June 2023 No.47 Squadron led a three aircraft flypast round all four nations of the United Kingdom,taking in many sites linked to the history of the Hercules and 47 Squadron. On 23 June 2023, at a farewell party for the Hercules at RAF Brize Norton in Oxfordshire, 47 Squadron's band performed in front of a Hercules rear cargo ramp, joined by vocalist Bruce Dickinson for songs by Dickinson's band Iron Maiden.

The squadron disbanded on 21 September 2023, after the squadron standard was laid up at RAF Cranwell on 31 July 2023.
