= Baron Tedder =

Barony in the Peerage of the United Kingdom

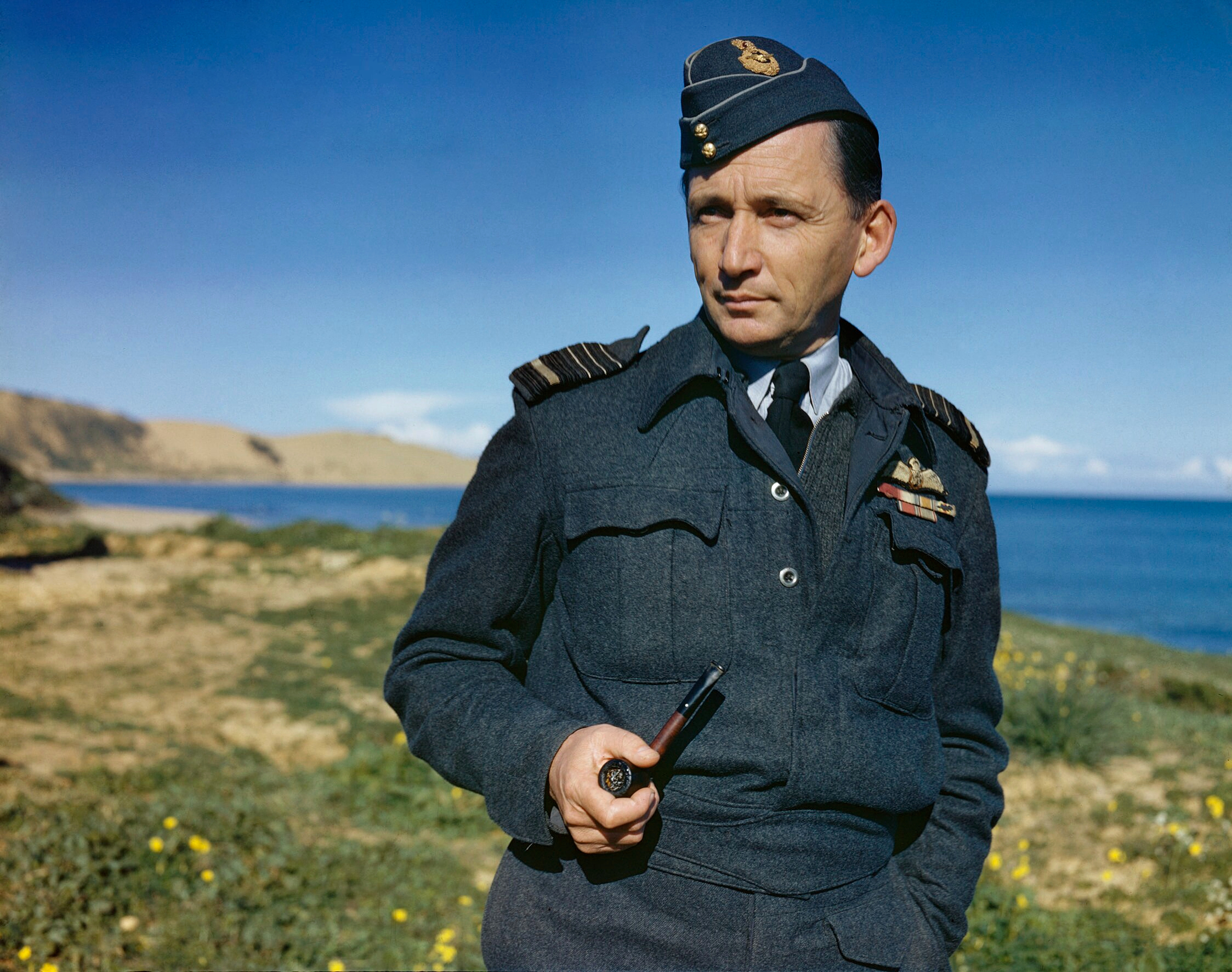
Arthur Tedder, 1st Baron Tedder

Baron Tedder, of Glenguin in the County of Stirling, is a title in the Peerage of the United Kingdom. It was created in 1946 for Marshal of the Royal Air Force, Sir Arthur Tedder. His second son, the second Baron, was Purdie Professor of Chemistry at the University of St Andrews. As of 2010 the title is held by the latter's son, the third Baron, who succeeded in 1994.

Sir Arthur John Tedder, father of the first Baron, was Commissioner of the Board of Customs and devised the old age pension scheme.

== Barons Tedder (1946) ==
- Arthur William Tedder, 1st Baron Tedder (1890–1967)
- John Michael Tedder, 2nd Baron Tedder (1926–1994)
- Robin John Tedder, 3rd Baron Tedder (b. 1955)

The heir apparent is the present holder's son Hon. Benjamin John Tedder (b. 1985).

== Arms ==
Coat of arms of Baron Tedder
Crest Issuant from an astral crown Or a lion sejant guardant Sable armed and langued Or holding in the sinister forepaw a sword enflamed as in the arms. Escutcheon Sable a sword enflamed palewise all Proper in chief an eagle affrontee volant head to sinister Or. Supporters Two representations of the God Horus all Proper. Motto For Freedom
