= John Cunningham (Royal Navy officer) =

Royal Navy Admiral of the Fleet (1885–1962)

Admiral of the Fleet Sir John Cunningham GCB MVO DL
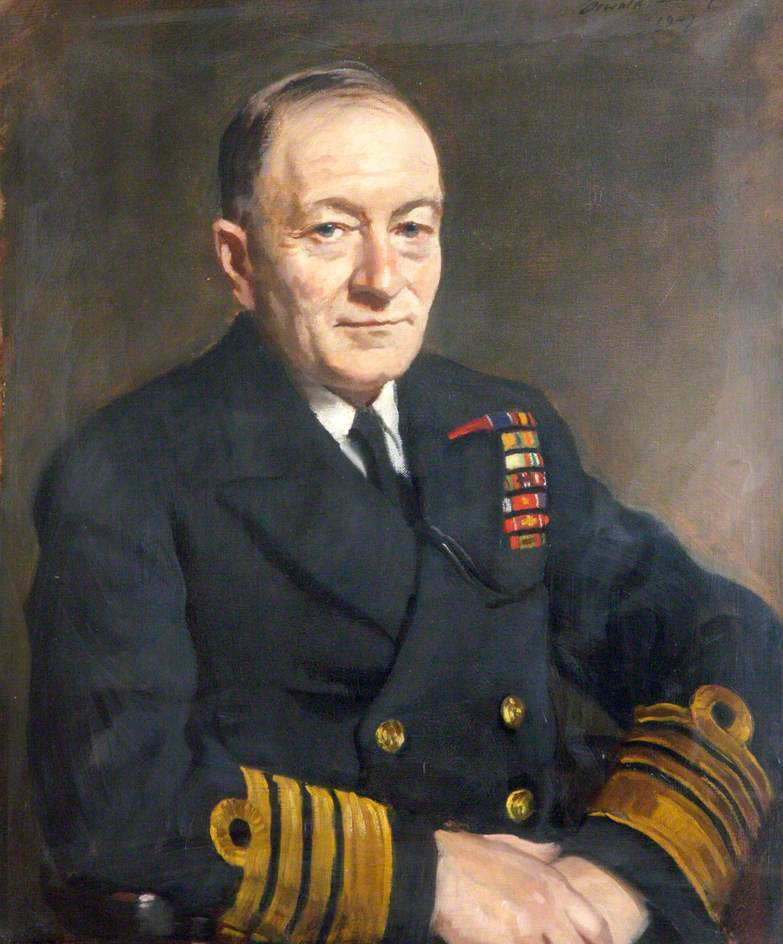
- Portrait of Sir John Cunningham by Oswald Birley
- Born: 13 April 1885; Demerara, British Guiana
- Died: 13 December 1962 (aged 77); London, United Kingdom
- Military career
- Allegiance: United Kingdom
- Branch: Royal Navy
- Service years: 1900–1948
- Rank: Admiral of the fleet
- Commands: First Sea Lord; Mediterranean Fleet; Levant Fleet; 1st Cruiser Squadron; HMS Resolution; HMS Adventure
- Conflicts: First World War; Second World War
- Awards: Knight Grand Cross of the Order of the Bath; Member of the Royal Victorian Order; Mentioned in Despatches; Legion of Merit (United States); Order of St Olav (Norway); Legion d'honneur (France); Croix de Guerre (France); Order of George I (Greece); War Cross (Greece)

Admiral of the Fleet Sir John Henry Dacres Cunningham GCB, MVO, DL (13 April 1885 – 13 December 1962) was a Royal Navy officer. A qualified senior navigator, he became Director of Plans at the Admiralty in 1930. He saw action as Commander-in-Chief of the Mediterranean Fleet during the Second World War with responsibility for the allied landings at Anzio and in the south of France. He served as First Sea Lord in the late 1940s: his focus was on implementing the Government's policy of scrapping many serviceable ships.

== Early life ==
Born the son of Henry Hutt Cunningham QC and Elizabeth Mary Cunningham (née Park), Cunningham was educated at Stubbington House School. He joined the Royal Navy as a cadet in the training ship HMS Britannia in January 1900 and was posted as a midshipman to the cruiser HMS Gibraltar on the Cape of Good Hope Station in June 1901.

Cunningham was promoted to sub lieutenant on 30 July 1904; he returned home to take the qualifying examinations for promotion, obtaining four out of five first-class certificates and was therefore promoted to lieutenant on 30 October 1905. He qualified as a navigator at the Royal Navy Navigation School and he was appointed as assistant navigator for the battleship HMS Illustrious in May 1906. He graduated to the role of senior navigator of the gunboat HMS Hebe in September 1906, of the cruiser HMS Indefatigable in the West Indies Station in January 1908 and then of the minelayer HMS Iphigenia in the Home Fleet in April 1909. He undertook an instructor's course and became an instructor at the Royal Navy Navigation School in 1910. He became navigator on the cruiser HMS Berwick on the West Indies Station in May 1911 and was promoted to lieutenant commander on 30 October 1913.

== First World War ==
Cunningham served in the First World War initially in HMS Berwick before he was transferred to the battleship HMS Russell in the Mediterranean in July 1915. He survived her sinking by mines in Maltese waters in April 1916. After a brief rest, Cunningham was appointed as senior navigator in the battlecruiser HMS Renown in the Grand Fleet. While serving in the Mediterranean he was promoted to commander, on 30 June 1917. He became navigator of HMS Lion in the Grand Fleet in July 1918.

== The Interwar years ==
After the war Cunningham served again as an instructor but was appointed as navigator in the newly commissioned battlecruiser HMS Hood in December 1919. During his time on the Hood, he became the squadron navigator for the entire battle-cruiser squadron, commanded at the time by Sir Roger Keyes.

He returned ashore in April 1921 to serve as commander of the navigation school and followed this in August 1923 by appointment as master of the fleet in HMS Queen Elizabeth, the flagship of Admiral Sir John de Robeck. He was promoted captain on 30 June 1924 and, having been appointed a Member of the Royal Victorian Order on 26 July 1924, he joined the staff of the Royal Naval College, Greenwich, in February 1925. He again returned to sea in January 1928 as commanding officer of the minelayer HMS Adventure. He then became deputy Director of Plans at the Admiralty in December 1929.

Cunningham was posted to the Admiralty as Director of Plans in December 1930. He took command of the battleship HMS Resolution as flag captain to Admiral Sir William Fisher, the commander-in-chief of the Mediterranean Fleet in September 1933. After being appointed Naval Aide-de-Camp to the King on 1 September 1935, he was promoted to rear admiral on 1 January 1936. He became Assistant Chief of the Naval Staff in October 1936 and appointed a Companion of the Order of the Bath in the 1937 Coronation Honours. His responsibilities increased significantly when the Fleet Air Arm transferred from the Air Ministry to the Admiralty and he was re-designated Assistant Chief of the Naval Staff (Air) in August 1937. Duff Cooper, then First Lord of the Admiralty, removed him from his position as he felt he was not making a success of his running of the Fleet Air Arm, and, as he later recorded (5 January 1944) "had not [had] a very high opinion of his qualities". He was given command of the 1st Cruiser Squadron in the Mediterranean Fleet flying his flag in HMS Devonshire from 19 August 1938 and promoted to vice admiral on 30 June 1939.

== Second World War ==
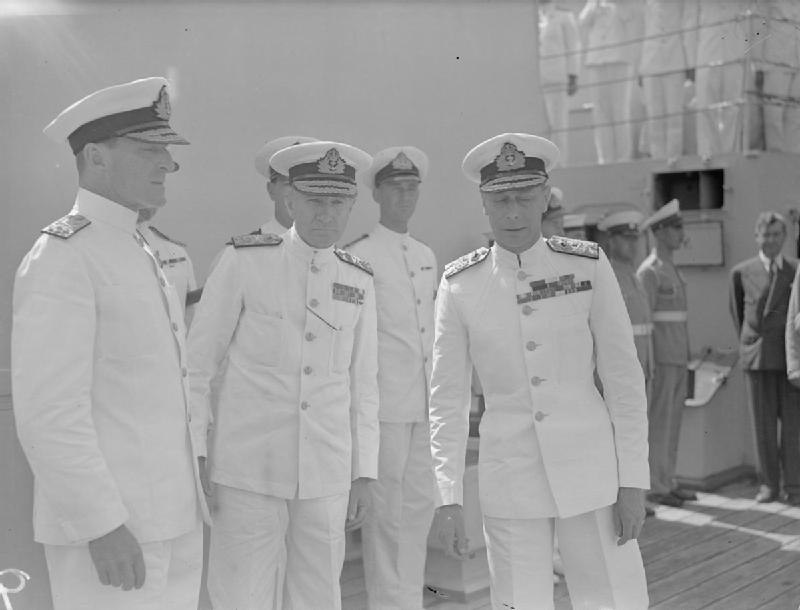
Cunningham (centre) with Rear Admiral John Mansfield (left) and King George VI (right).

Cunningham's cruiser squadron was asked to reinforce the Home Fleet under Admiral Sir Charles Forbes and assigned to the Norwegian campaign. He took part in the evacuation of allied troops from Namsos in May 1940 and the following month embarked King Haakon VII and his government ministers aboard the Devonshire under orders to take them to the United Kingdom. Shortly after their departure from Tromsø on this voyage, the aircraft carrier HMS Glorious and her two screening destroyers HMS Acasta and HMS Ardent were attacked and sunk on 8 June by the battlecruisers Scharnhorst and Gneisenau. The 39 sailors who survived this debacle, and then two days on life rafts on the cold ocean, were rescued by Norwegian ships on their way to the Faeroe Islands.

An analysis of this battle, supported by eyewitness statements from the Devonshire, concluded that the Glorious transmitted a radio signal about the sighting of the German warships, but it was received only by the Devonshire. Cunningham took steps to suppress the news about the signal, and he and his fleet continued on their way. According to a Norwegian report, there were 461 passengers on board the Devonshire, and Cunningham showed the message to King Haakon who asked what his orders were: Cunningham replied, "to bring you safely to England". The King later remarked, "I realised this was not to Admiral Cunningham's liking". Cunningham was "mentioned in dispatches" on 11 July 1940.

Cunningham was appointed joint commander of Operation Menace, an unsuccessful attempt in September 1940 to take Dakar in Senegal (formerly French West Africa) as a potential base for the Free French forces there.

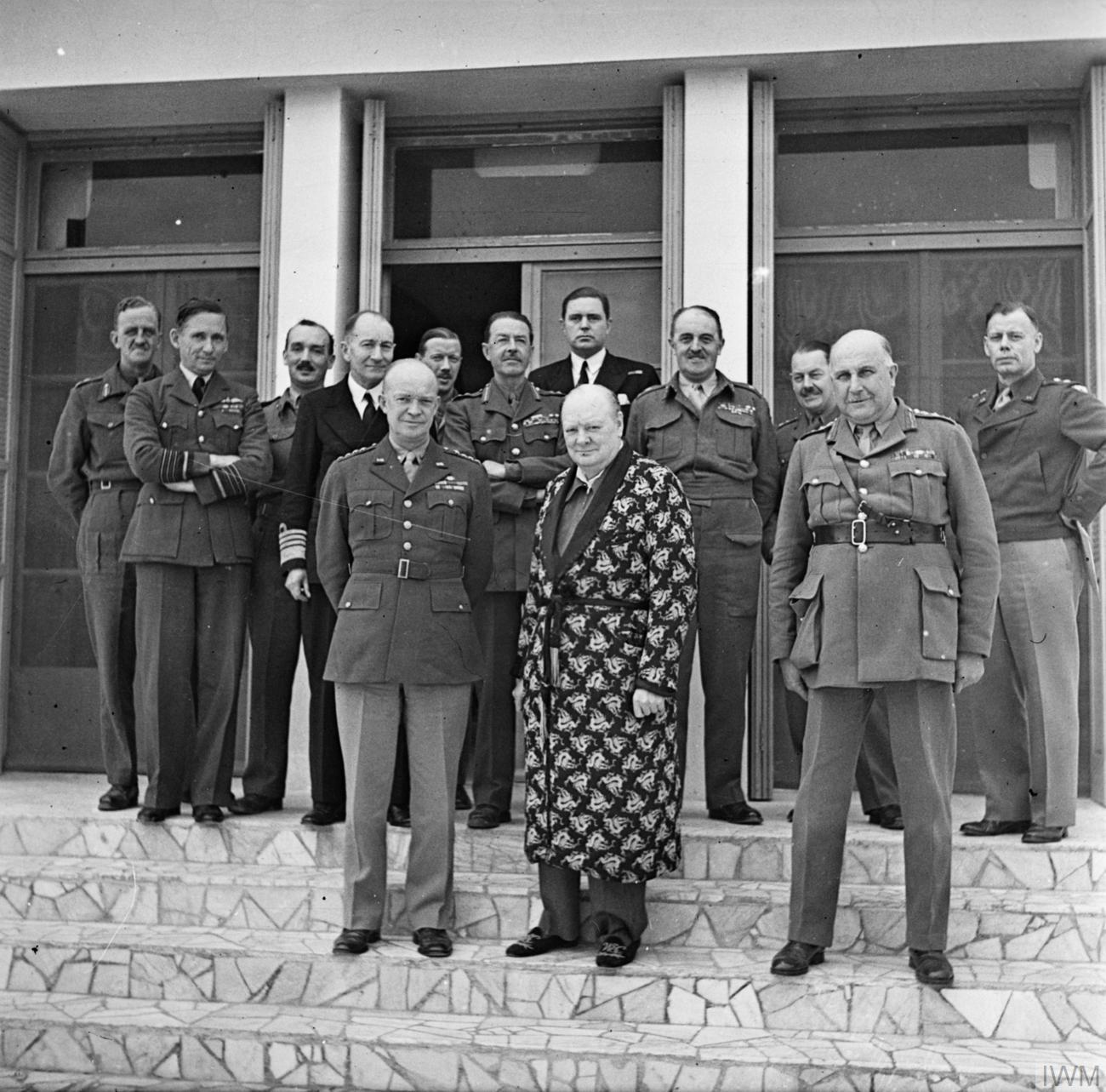
A convalescent Winston Churchill meets the outgoing and incoming Supreme Commanders in the Mediterranean, Dwight D. Eisenhower, to Churchill's right, and Henry Maitland Wilson, to his left. Behind them stand (from left to right), John Whiteley, Air Marshal Arthur Tedder, Brigadier G. S. Thompson, Admiral Sir John Cunningham, unknown, Sir Harold Alexander, Captain M. L. Power, Humfrey Gale, Leslie Hollis, and Eisenhower's chief of staff, Walter Bedell Smith.

Cunningham became the Fourth Sea Lord and Chief of Supplies and Transport early in 1941, and he was promoted to Knight Commander of the Order of the Bath in the 1941 Birthday Honours. Cunningham went on to be Commander-in-Chief, Levant in June 1943, and after having been promoted to full Admiral on 4 August 1943, he became the Commander-in-Chief, Mediterranean Fleet in December 1943. He was in command for the Allied landing at Anzio, Italy, in 1944, and for the large landing of Operation Dragoon on the southern coast of France, in September 1944.

Cunningham was appointed as a Chief Commander of the American Legion of Merit on 17 July 1945. He was appointed a Grand Officier of the French Legion of Honneur and also awarded the French Croix de Guerre avec Palmes in 1945. He was also appointed a Knight Grand Cross of the Greek Order of George I on 22 May 1945 and then awarded the Greek War Cross 1st Class on 19 March 1946. Additionally he was appointed Commander of the Norwegian Order of St. Olav on 13 October 1942 and appointed a Knight Grand Cross of that Order on 22 July 1947.

== First Sea Lord and last years ==
Cunningham was promoted to Knight Grand Cross of the Order of the Bath in the 1946 New Year Honours, and he succeeded Andrew Cunningham (no relation) as the First Sea Lord in May 1946. As the First Sea Lord his focus was on implementing the Government's policy of scrapping numerous serviceable ships. He was made a Freeman of the City of London in 1946, and he was promoted to Admiral of the Fleet on 21 January 1948 before retiring in September 1948. After leaving the Royal Navy, Cunningham became the chairman of the Iraq Petroleum Company and the Deputy Lieutenant of Bedfordshire.

Admiral Cunningham attended the coronation of Queen Elizabeth II in June 1953. He retired from the Iraq Petroleum Company in 1958 and as the Deputy Lieutenant of Bedfordshire in 1959. Cunningham died in the Middlesex Hospital on 13 December 1962.

== Family ==
On 8 March 1910 Cunningham married his first cousin, Dorothy May. He had spent some of his early years in Ulverston with Dorothy, after his parents had both died at sea. They had two sons, John and Richard; John became a fire brigade chief and Richard a Royal Navy lieutenant in the Submarine Service. Richard was killed during World War II, in action on board HMS P33 in August 1941.

== Sources ==
- Cooper, Duff (2006). The Duff Cooper Diaries: 1915-1951. Weidenfeld & Nicolson. ISBN 978-0-75382-105-3.
- Haarr, Geirr H (2010). Battle for Norway: April-June 1940. Seaforth Publishing, UK. ISBN 978-1-84832-057-4.
- Heathcote, Tony (2002). The British Admirals of the Fleet 1734 – 1995. Pen & Sword Ltd. ISBN 0-85052-835-6.
- Winton, John (1999). Carrier "Glorious": The Life and Death of an Aircraft Carrier. Cassell Military, London. ISBN 0-304-35244-6.

Military offices
Preceded by Sir Geoffrey Arbuthnot	Fourth Sea Lord; 1941–1943	Succeeded by Frank Pegram
Preceded by Sir Henry Harwood	C-in-C, Levant; June – August 1943	Succeeded by Sir Algernon Willis
Preceded by Sir Andrew Cunningham	C-in-C, Mediterranean Fleet; 1943–1946	Succeeded by Sir Algernon Willis
Preceded by The Viscount Cunningham of Hyndhope	First Sea Lord; 1946–1948	Succeeded by The Lord Fraser of North Cape
