= Walter Anderson (RAF officer, died 1936) =

- Born: 6 October 1890; Ryde, Isle of Wight
- Died: 15 September 1936 (aged 45); Gatwick Airport, London
- Military career
- Allegiance: United Kingdom
- Branch: Royal Air Force
- Rank: Flight Lieutenant
- Conflicts: First World War; Southern Russia Intervention
- Awards: Companion of the Distinguished Service Order; Distinguished Flying Cross; Order of St Vladimir, 4th Class with Swords; Order of St Stanislaus, 2nd Class with Swords; Cross of St George, 4th Class

Flight Lieutenant Walter Fraser Anderson DSO, DFC (6 October 1890 – 15 September 1936) was a Royal Flying Corps (RFC) and Royal Air Force (RAF) pilot who served in World War I and the Allied effort in the Southern Russia Intervention. He was later a commercial pilot for British Airways Ltd.

== Early life ==
Born in Ryde, Isle of Wight, Anderson was the youngest son of Capt John Weir Anderson and moved to Toronto when a child.

== Military career ==
In Russia the RAF supported the Allies in their efforts to defend against and attack Bolshevik forces. During a reconnaissance mission three de Havilland DH.9A planes of the RAF's No. 47 Squadron were flying over southern Russia. While taking pictures of Bolshevik units, ground fire punched holes in the fuel tank of the DH.9A of Flight Lieutenant Walter Anderson (pilot) and observer officer John Mitchell. Mitchell was able to stop the loss of fuel by climbing onto the wing and plugging the holes with his fingers. When another DH.9A was forced down by the anti-aircraft fire, Anderson and Mitchell landed to pick up its crew, Captain William Elliot (later Air Chief Marshal) and Lieutenant Laidlaw. Mitchell was still on the wing and Laidlaw took over his Lewis machine gun in the rear cockpit in order to hold off a Bolshevik cavalry charge. With a punctured fuel tank, Mitchell holding onto the wing to plug the fuel tank, and two extra passengers, Anderson was able to get his plane into the air again. The four of them returned safely to the Russian RAF base.

On 30th July, 1919, near Cherni Yar (Volga), these officers were pilot and observer respectively, on a D.H. 9 machine, which descended to an altitude of 1,000 feet to take oblique photographs of the enemy's position. A second machine of the same flight which followed as escort was completely disabled by machine-gun fire and forced to land five miles behind the enemy's foremost troops. Parties of hostile cavalry which attempted to capture the pilot and observer of the crashed machine were kept away by the observer's Lewis gun whilst the pilot burnt the machine.

Flight Lieut. Anderson, notwithstanding that his petrol tank had been pierced by a machine-gun bullet, landed alongside the wrecked aeroplane, picked up the pilot and observer, and got safely home.

The risk involved in attempting this gallant rescue was very great, as had any accident occurred in landing the fate of all four officers can only be conjectured. The difficult circumstances of the rescue will be fully appreciated when it is remembered that Observer Officer Mitchell had to mount the port plane to stop the holes in the petrol tank with his thumbs for a period of fifty minutes flying on the return journey.

— The London Gazette Supplement: 31847

Anderson and Mitchell would be nominated for the Victoria Cross, but supporting documentation was lost during the evacuation from Russia. On another mission in Russia, Anderson and another observer, Captain George G. MacLennan of Owen Sound, Ontario, shot down an observation balloon and then bombed a Bolshevik airfield at Tcherni-Yar. During the engagement, MacLennan was mortally wounded by anti-aircraft fire and bled to death before the plane could land.

== Later life and death ==
Walter Anderson left the RAF in 1927 and became a commercial pilot for British Airways Ltd. He died in a crash at Gatwick Airport, London, on 15 September 1936. The crash of the de Havilland D.H.86A was suspected to be caused by the radio operator getting his foot caught between the fire extinguisher and the second rudder bar.

He was buried at St Nicholas' Church, Worth in West Sussex.

== Personal life ==
He married Phyllis Mary Joseph of Zeitorin, Cairo on 2 February 1922 at the British Consulate and later at the All Saints' Cathedral, Cairo. They had two sons, John Fraser Anderson and Maurice Fraser Anderson. They both came to Canada after his death. He petitioned for divorce in 1934. In 1936 he remarried, Vivian ?. He died not long after.

== Bibliography ==
Notes

References

- Dobson, Christopher; Miller, John (1986). The Day They Almost Bombed Moscow: The Allied War in Russia, 1918-1920. New York: Atheneum. ISBN 9780689117138. - Total pages: 288
- FlightGlobal (24 September 1936). "The Gatwick Accident". FlightGlobal.
- FlightGlobal (22 October 1936a). "Gatwick and Mirabella". FlightGlobal.
- The London Gazette (30 March 1920). "Distinguished Conduct Medal announcements in the Fifth Supplement to the London Gazette 31128". The London Gazette. London, UK: Government of the United Kingdom. ISSN 0374-3721. OCLC 6672113.
- Halliday, Hugh A. (8 January 2008). "Canadians Against The Bolsheviks: Air Force, Part 25". Legion Magazine. Archived from the original on 30 July 2019.
