= John Westall =

New Zealand Royal Marines officer

General Sir John Westall KCB CBE
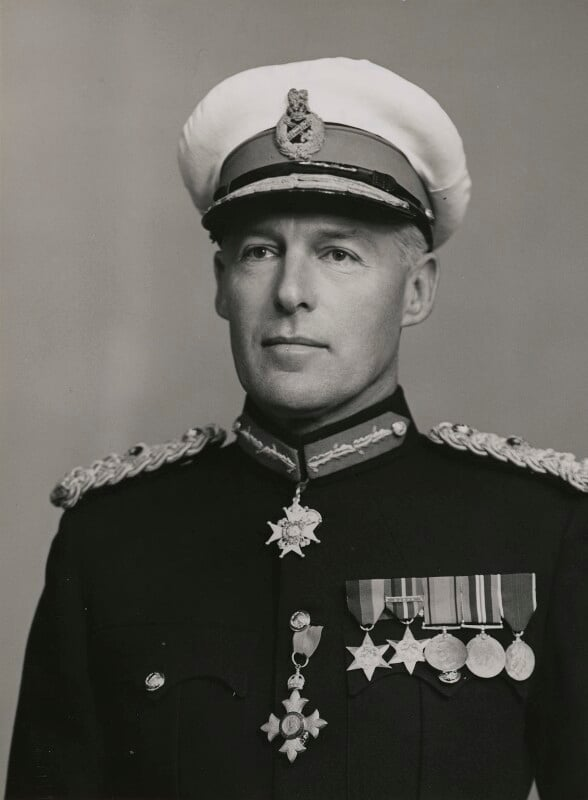
- Westall in 1953
- Born: 2 July 1901; Napier, New Zealand
- Died: 30 September 1986 (aged 85); Christchurch, New Zealand
- Military career
- Allegiance: United Kingdom
- Branch: Royal Marines
- Service years: 1919–1955
- Rank: General
- Commands: Commandant General Royal Marines; Infantry Training Centre, Royal Marines
- Conflicts: Second World War
- Awards: Knight Commander of the Order of the Bath; Commander of the Order of the British Empire

General Sir John Chaddesley Westall, KCB, CBE (2 July 1901 – 30 September 1986) was a New Zealand Royal Marines officer who served as Commandant General Royal Marines from 1952 to 1955.

== Military career ==
Born in Napier, New Zealand, Westall joined the Royal Marines in 1919. He served in the Second World War as a Staff Officer in intelligence activities in Singapore and Malaya from 1939 and as a Staff Officer in intelligence activities in India and Burma from 1942, before becoming a Staff Officer at the Director of Naval Intelligence Department in the Admiralty in 1944.

After the war he became commander of the Infantry Training Centre, Royal Marines and then a Staff Officer in intelligence activities in Cape Town from 1947. He was appointed Chief Staff Officer at Plymouth in 1948, commander of the Royal Marine Barracks at Plymouth in 1949 and commander of the Royal Marine Barracks at Deal in 1950. He went on to be chief of staff to the Commandant General Royal Marines in 1951, and Commandant General Royal Marines in 1952 before retiring in 1955.

Military offices
Preceded by Sir Leslie Hollis	Commandant General Royal Marines; 1952–1955	Succeeded by Sir Campbell Hardy
