= Geoffrey Thompson (British Army officer) =

British Army general

Lieutenant-General Sir Geoffrey Thompson KBE CB DSO
- Thompson in 1957
- Born: 6 January 1905; Berkshire, England
- Died: 15 November 1983 (aged 78)
- Military career
- Allegiance: United Kingdom
- Branch: British Army
- Service years: 1925–1961
- Rank: Lieutenant-General
- Service number: 31611
- Unit: Royal Artillery
- Commands: 1st Field Regiment, Royal Artillery; 2nd Army Group Royal Artillery
- Conflicts: World War II
- Awards: Knight Commander of the Order of the British Empire; Companion of the Order of the Bath; Distinguished Service Order; Legion of Merit (United States)

Lieutenant-General Sir Geoffrey Stuart Thompson KBE CB DSO (6 January 1905 – 15 November 1983) was a senior British Army officer who became military secretary.

== Military career ==
Thompson was born as the youngest of three sons in Wokingham, Berkshire, in 1905, the son of Brigadier-General William Arthur Murray Thompson and his wife, Henrietta Rickman. He was educated at the Royal Naval College, Osborne and Britannia Royal Naval College before going to the Royal Military Academy, Woolwich. After passing out from Woolwich, Thompson was commissioned into the Royal Artillery on 28 January 1925.

He served in World War II and from 1942 was attached the French Forces in the Middle East. In 1944 he was made commanding officer of 1st Field Regiment in Italy. He took part in the liberation of Athens in 1945.

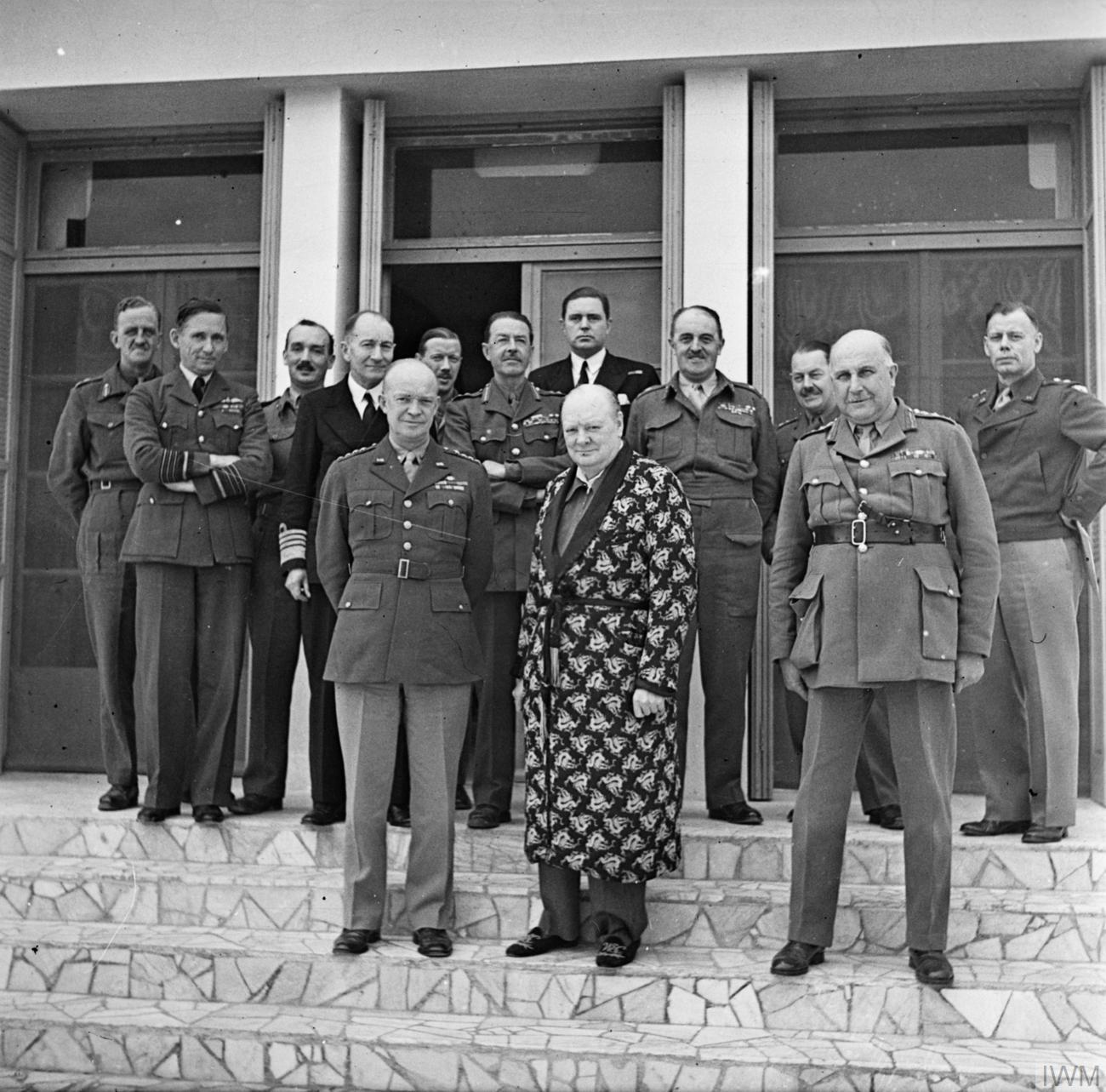
A convalescent Winston Churchill meets the outgoing and incoming Supreme Commanders in the Mediterranean, Dwight D. Eisenhower, to Churchill's right, and Henry Maitland Wilson, to his left. Behind them stand (from left to right), John Whiteley, Air Marshal Arthur Tedder, Brigadier G. S. Thompson, Admiral Sir John Cunningham, unknown, Sir Harold Alexander, Captain M. L. Power, Humfrey Gale, Leslie Hollis, and Eisenhower's chief of staff, Walter Bedell Smith.

In 1945 Winston Churchill ordered the planning of "Operation Unthinkable", to launch an offensive against the Soviet Forces after the defeat of Germany to wrest Eastern Europe from the Soviet Union. Thompson was asked to create a plan to push back the Soviet Forces into Poland. The plan could only muster some 47 UK and US Divisions against 170 Soviet ones and controversially sought to rearm Wehrmacht and SS troops to close the gap. Widespread opposition from the UK Chiefs of Staff eventually saw it shelved. He was awarded the Legion of Merit by the United States in 1947.

He later became chief of staff at Anti-Aircraft Command and then, from 1950, commander of No. 2 Army Group Royal Artillery in Egypt. He was appointed director of land/air warfare and director of NATO standardisation at the War Office in 1952 and went on to be senior army instructor at the Imperial Defence College in 1955. He was appointed director of staff duties at the War Office in 1957 and military secretary in 1959. He retired in 1961.

He was also colonel commandant of the Royal Artillery from 1961 to 1969.

In retirement he became a director of Arthur Guinness, Son & Co. (Dublin) Limited.

Military offices
Preceded by Sir Hugh Stockwell	Military Secretary; 1959−1961	Succeeded by Sir William Stirling
