= Campbell Hardy (Royal Marines officer) =

English Royal Marines officer

General Sir Campbell Hardy KCB CBE DSO**
- Born: 24 May 1906
- Died: 29 July 1984 (aged 78); Chichester, Sussex, England
- Military career
- Allegiance: United Kingdom
- Branch: Royal Marines
- Service years: 1924–1959
- Rank: General
- Commands: Commandant General Royal Marines (1955–1959); Royal Marine Depot, Deal (1951–1952); 3 Commando Brigade (1944–1945; 1948–1951); 46 Commando (1943–1944)
- Conflicts: Second World War; Suez Crisis
- Awards: Knight Commander of the Order of the Bath; Commander of the Order of the British Empire; Companion of the Distinguished Service Order & Two Bars

General Sir Campbell Richard Hardy, KCB, CBE, DSO & Two Bars (24 May 1906 – 29 July 1984) was a Royal Marines officer who served as Commandant General Royal Marines from 1955 to 1959.

== Military career ==
Educated at Felsted School, Hardy was commissioned into the Royal Marines in 1924 and qualified as Physical Training Officer. He served in the Second World War, being appointed as the first Commanding Officer of 46 Commando from 1943 and was appointed a Companion of the Distinguished Service Order (DSO) for his "gallant and distinguished services while operating with the Army in Normandy" This was followed by the award of a Bar to his DSO for "Courage, example and enthusiasm during commando operations in Northern Europe", before he transferred to the Pacific theatre in 1944 and was appointed to command 3 Commando Brigade in Burma and Hong Kong. On 29 December 1944, 3 Commando Brigade, under Hardy's command, carried out an unopposed landing on the island of Akyab in Burma. Between 22 and 23 January 1945 he led a successful defence against Japanese forces at the Battle of Hill 170. After the battle, the commander of the XV Indian Corps—Lieutenant-General Philip Christison—stated in a special order of the day to 3 Commando Brigade, "The Battle of Kangaw had been the decisive battle of the whole Arakan campaign and that it was won was very largely due to your magnificent defence of Hill 170."

After the war Hardy became Chief Instructor at the School of Combined Operations at Fremington, was appointed an Officer of the Order of the British Empire in 1948, and then served as commander of 3 Commando Brigade again in Malta, Hong Kong and Malaya. He went on to be commander of the Royal Marine Depot, Deal in 1951, was advanced to Commander of the Order of the British Empire in October of that year, made chief of staff of the Royal Marines in 1952 and appointed Commandant General Royal Marines in 1955. He made an unofficial visit to the 45 Commando landing zone at Suez in 1956, was knighted as a Knight Commander of the Order of the Bath in 1957, and retired in 1959.

== Retirement ==
In retirement Hardy became Director of the Coal Utilisation Council. He lived at Bunch Lane House at Bunch Lane in Haslemere.

== Bibliography ==
- Fowler, Will (2009). Royal Marine Commando 1950–82: From Korea to the Falklands. Osprey Publishing. ISBN 978-1-84603-372-8.
- Moreman, Tim (2006). British Commandos 1940–46. Osprey Publishing. ISBN 978-1-84176-986-8.
- Saunders, Hilary St. George (1959) [1949]. The Green Beret: The Commandos at War. London: Four Square Books. OCLC 1260659.

Military offices
Preceded by Sir John Westall	Commandant General Royal Marines; 1955–1959	Succeeded by Sir Ian Riches
