= John Whiteley (British Army officer) =

British army officer (1896–1970)

General Sir John Whiteley GBE KCB MC
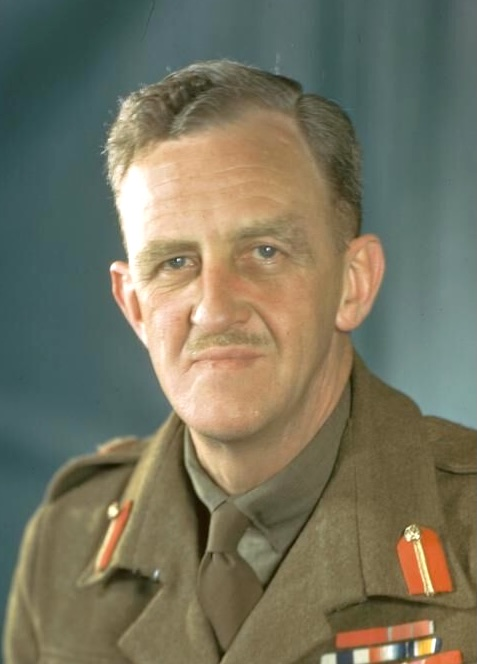
- Born: 7 June 1896
- Died: 20 May 1970 (aged 73)
- Military career
- Allegiance: United Kingdom
- Branch: British Army
- Service years: 1915–1956
- Rank: General
- Nickname: "Jock"
- Service number: 10235
- Unit: Royal Engineers
- Commands: National Defence College, Canada; Canadian Army Staff College
- Conflicts: First World War: Salonika campaign; Sinai and Palestine campaign; Second World War: Western Desert campaign; Battle of Greece; Operation Torch; Tunisian campaign; Allied invasion of Sicily; Allied invasion of Italy; Operation Overlord; Siegfried Line Campaign; Battle of the Bulge; Western Allied invasion of Germany
- Awards: Knight Grand Cross of the Order of the British Empire; Knight Commander of the Order of the Bath; Military Cross; Mentioned in Despatches; Distinguished Service Medal (United States); Legion of Merit (United States)

General Sir John Francis Martin Whiteley, GBE, KCB, MC (7 June 1896 – 20 May 1970) was a senior British Army officer who became Deputy Chief of the Imperial General Staff (DCIGS). A career soldier, Whiteley was commissioned into the Royal Engineers from the Royal Military Academy, Woolwich in 1915 during the First World War. During the war he served in Salonika and the Middle East.

In May 1940, during the Second World War, he was posted to General Headquarters (GHQ) Middle East in Cairo as Brigadier, General Staff (BGS) (Operations) under General Sir Archibald Wavell. In March 1942 he became chief of staff of the British Eighth Army, participating in the Battle of Gazala and the First Battle of El Alamein. In September 1942 Whiteley joined Lieutenant General Dwight D. Eisenhower's Allied Force Headquarters (AFHQ) as the British Deputy Chief of Staff. When Eisenhower was appointed Supreme Allied Commander for Operation Overlord in January 1944, Whiteley was one of three key British staff officers Eisenhower brought to England to staff the Supreme Headquarters Allied Expeditionary Force (SHAEF). Whiteley initially became Assistant Chief of Staff, Intelligence (G-2) at SHAEF before becoming deputy to the Assistant Chief of Staff, Operations (G-3), Major General Harold R. Bull in May 1944.

After a few months in Germany as Assistant Chief of Staff in the Control Commission, Whiteley was appointed Army Instructor at the Imperial Defence College to initiate the post-war courses under General Sir William Slim as commandant. In 1947 Whiteley was selected for an exchange of appointments with Canada, and became Commandant of the Royal Military College of Canada. He was DCIGS under Slim from 1949 until 1953, when he was promoted to full general, and took up his last appointment, as chairman of the British Joint Services Mission, Washington, D.C., and UK Representative on the NATO Standing Group from 1953 to 1956.

== Early life and interbellum ==
John Francis Martin Whiteley was educated at Blundell's School in Tiverton and at the Royal Military Academy at Woolwich. He was commissioned as an officer in February 1915, some six months after the British entry into World War I, into the Royal Engineers of the British Army. During the war he served in Salonika and the Middle East. He was awarded the Military Cross, and was mentioned in despatches.

With the war now over, Whiteley attended the Staff College, Camberley from January 1927 to December 1928. He was married the year after graduating and served in India where he was a Deputy Assistant Adjutant General from 1932 to 1934 before returning to the United Kingdom to serve as a staff officer at the War Office in London from 1932 to 1934. He served there as a GSO2 from January 1935.

== Second World War ==
=== Middle East ===
When the Second World War began in September 1939, Whiteley was serving in the War Office as a General Staff Officer, Grade 1 (GSO1). In May 1940 he was posted to General Headquarters (GHQ) Middle East in Cairo as Brigadier, General Staff (Operations) under General Sir Archibald Wavell. In February 1941, Whiteley conducted a series of meetings with President Franklin D. Roosevelt's emissary to Britain, William J. Donovan, who had been sent to the Middle East on a fact-finding mission. Following the passage of the United States Lend-Lease Act on 11 March 1941, Whiteley was sent to Washington, D.C., in May 1941 to present the President with Wavell's requirements. Whiteley's mission was fairly successful, and resulted in sixteen ships a month for the remainder of the year delivering supplies to the Middle East. Although not all of the requested items could be supplied, by the end of July store and equipment including nearly 10,000 trucks, 84 M3 Stuart tanks and 174 combat aircraft had arrived.

Whiteley returned via London, where he briefed the Chief of the Imperial General Staff (CIGS), General Sir John Dill and the prime minister, Winston Churchill, on his mission to the United States. Churchill expressed his displeasure with the progress of the Western Desert campaign, which resulted in Wavell's replacement by General Sir Claude Auchinleck in July 1941. In October 1941 Whiteley became Auchinleck's envoy to London to brief the Prime Minister on the plans for Operation Crusader and the reasons why Auchinleck was resisting pressure to advance its date.

During Operation Crusader, Auchinleck relieved the commander of the Eighth Army, Lieutenant General Alan Cunningham, replacing him with his Deputy Chief of the General Staff (DCGS), Major General Neil Ritchie. Amid doubts about Ritchie's suitability for the post, Auchinleck and his new DCGS, Brigadier Eric Dorman-Smith, decided that Whiteley should become Chief of Staff of the Eighth Army. Whiteley assumed his new post on 28 March 1942. His time in the post saw British fortunes fall to their lowest ebb, with the disastrous Battle of Gazala and the fall of Tobruk. Auchinleck assumed personal command of the Eighth Army on 25 June, and Whiteley was superseded by the "dangerous super-numerary" Dorman-Smith to some extent. However, Whiteley remained in the job until after the First Battle of El Alamein, when he was replaced by Brigadier Freddie de Guingand. In Auchinleck's opinion, Whiteley had proved himself a disappointment as Chief of Staff of the Eighth Army, describing him as "not cut out for high staff appointments in a field formation." Despite this, he still recommended Whiteley for promotion on the basis of his performance at GHQ.

=== North West Europe ===
Whiteley joined Lieutenant General Dwight D. Eisenhower's Allied Forces Headquarters (AFHQ) as the British Deputy Chief of Staff, working with the American Deputy Chief of Staff, Brigadier General Alfred Gruenther, and the Chief of Staff, Brigadier General Walter Bedell Smith. As such, Whiteley, who was duly promoted to major general in February 1943, was involved in the planning and direction of the Tunisian campaign and the Allied invasion of Sicily (codenamed Operation Husky). In August 1943 he acted as an envoy once more, travelling to London to brief Churchill on plans for the Allied invasion of Italy.

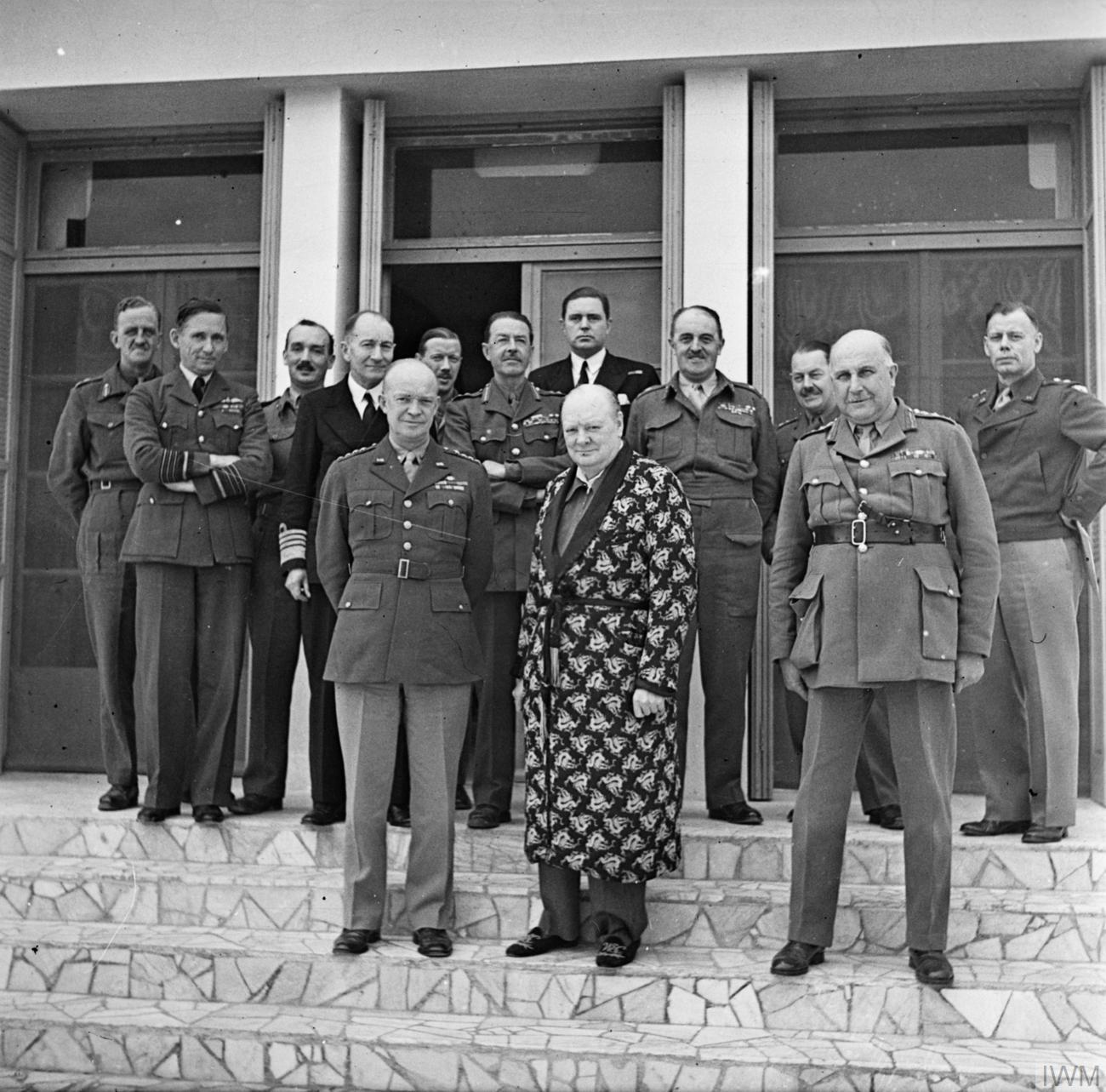
A convalescent Winston Churchill meets the outgoing and incoming Supreme Commanders in the Mediterranean, Dwight D. Eisenhower, to Churchill's right, and Henry Maitland Wilson, to his left. Behind them stand (from left to right), John Whiteley, Air Marshal Arthur Tedder, Brigadier G. S. Thompson, Admiral Sir John Cunningham, unknown, Sir Harold Alexander, Captain M. L. Power, Humfrey Gale, Leslie Hollis, and Eisenhower's chief of staff, Walter Bedell Smith.

When Eisenhower was appointed Supreme Allied Commander for Operation Overlord in January 1944, Whiteley was one of three key British staff officers he wanted to take with him to England to staff the Supreme Headquarters Allied Expeditionary Force (SHAEF), the others being Kenneth Strong and Humfrey Gale. Eisenhower encountered resistance to this from the CIGS, now General Sir Alan Brooke, who agreed to transfer Whiteley and, reluctantly, Gale, but not Strong. Accordingly, Whiteley initially became Assistant Chief of Staff, Intelligence (G-2) at SHAEF, with American Brigadier General Thomas J. Betts as his deputy. However Eisenhower eventually had his way and Strong assumed the post on 25 May 1944. Whiteley then became deputy to the Assistant Chief of Staff, Operations (G-3), Major General Harold R. Bull. Whiteley remained in this post for the rest of the war.

Whiteley remained on good terms with the staff at 21st Army Group, particularly de Guingand, who was now its chief of staff, although the relationship between the two headquarters was often stormy. In December, during the Battle of the Bulge, Whiteley and Betts visited the U.S. First Army headquarters and were unimpressed with the way that it was handling the situation. Strong, Whiteley and Betts then recommended that the American armies north of the Ardennes be transferred to Montgomery's command. Smith realized the military and political implications of this, and knew that such a recommendation had to come from an American officer. Smith's immediate reaction was to dismiss it out of hand, and tell Strong and Whiteley that they were fired and should pack their bags and return to the United Kingdom, but that night Smith had second thoughts. The next morning he apologized, and informed them that he would present their recommendation to Eisenhower as his own. Eisenhower immediately ordered it. This decision was greatly resented by many Americans.

== Post-war ==
After a few months in Germany as Assistant Chief of Staff in the Control Commission, Whiteley was appointed Army Instructor at the Imperial Defence College to initiate the post-war courses under General Sir William Slim as Commandant. In 1947 Whiteley was selected for an exchange of appointments with Canada, and became Commandant of the Royal Military College of Canada in Kingston, Ontario. His next appointment was as Deputy Chief of the Imperial General Staff (DCIGS) at the War Office under Slim and he served in this post from 1949 until 1953. In 1953 Whiteley was promoted general and took up his last appointment as chairman of the British Joint Services Mission in Washington, D.C., and UK Representative on the NATO Standing Group. It fell to him as the representative of the British Chiefs of Staff to conduct the discussions on the introduction of tactical atomic weapons and the consequent adjustments to defence plans.

Following his retirement in 1956, Whiteley and his wife settled in Wiltshire, at The Mill House, Steeple Langford. He died on 20 May 1970, at the age of 73, just a few weeks away from his 74th birthday.

== Notes ==
Academic offices
Preceded by Donald Agnew	Commandant of the Royal Military College of Canada; 1947	Succeeded by J. Desmond B. Smith
Military offices
Preceded by Sir Kenneth Crawford	Deputy Chief of the Imperial General Staff; 1949–1953	Succeeded by Sir Dudley Ward
Preceded by Sir William Elliott	Chief of the British Joint Staff Mission to Washington and UK Military Representative to NATO; 1953–1956	Succeeded by Sir Michael Denny
