= Leslie Hollis =

General Sir Leslie Hollis KCB KBE
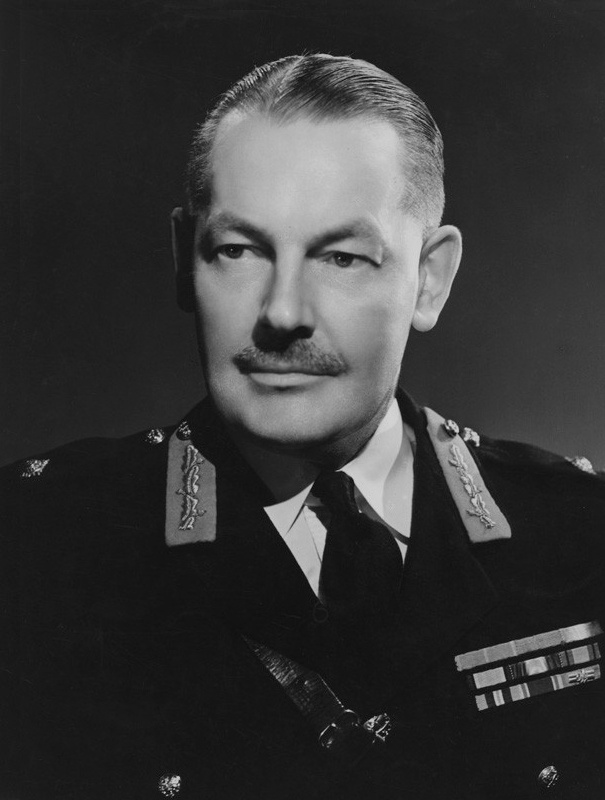
- General Sir Leslie Hollis, pictured here in 1946 when he was a major general
- Born: 9 February 1897; Bath, Somerset
- Died: 9 August 1963 (aged 66); Cuckfield, Sussex
- Military career
- Allegiance: United Kingdom
- Branch: Royal Marines
- Service years: 1914–1952
- Rank: General
- Nickname: "Jo"
- Unit: Royal Marine Light Infantry
- Commands: Commandant General Royal Marines
- Conflicts: First World War; Second World War
- Awards: Knight Commander of the Order of the Bath; Knight Commander of the Order of the British Empire; Legion of Merit (United States)

General Sir Leslie Chasemore Hollis, KCB, KBE (9 February 1897 – 9 August 1963) was a Royal Marines officer who served as Commandant General Royal Marines from 1949 to 1952.

== Military career ==
Hollis was commissioned into the Royal Marine Light Infantry in 1914 and served in the First World War in the Grand Fleet and the Harwich Force.

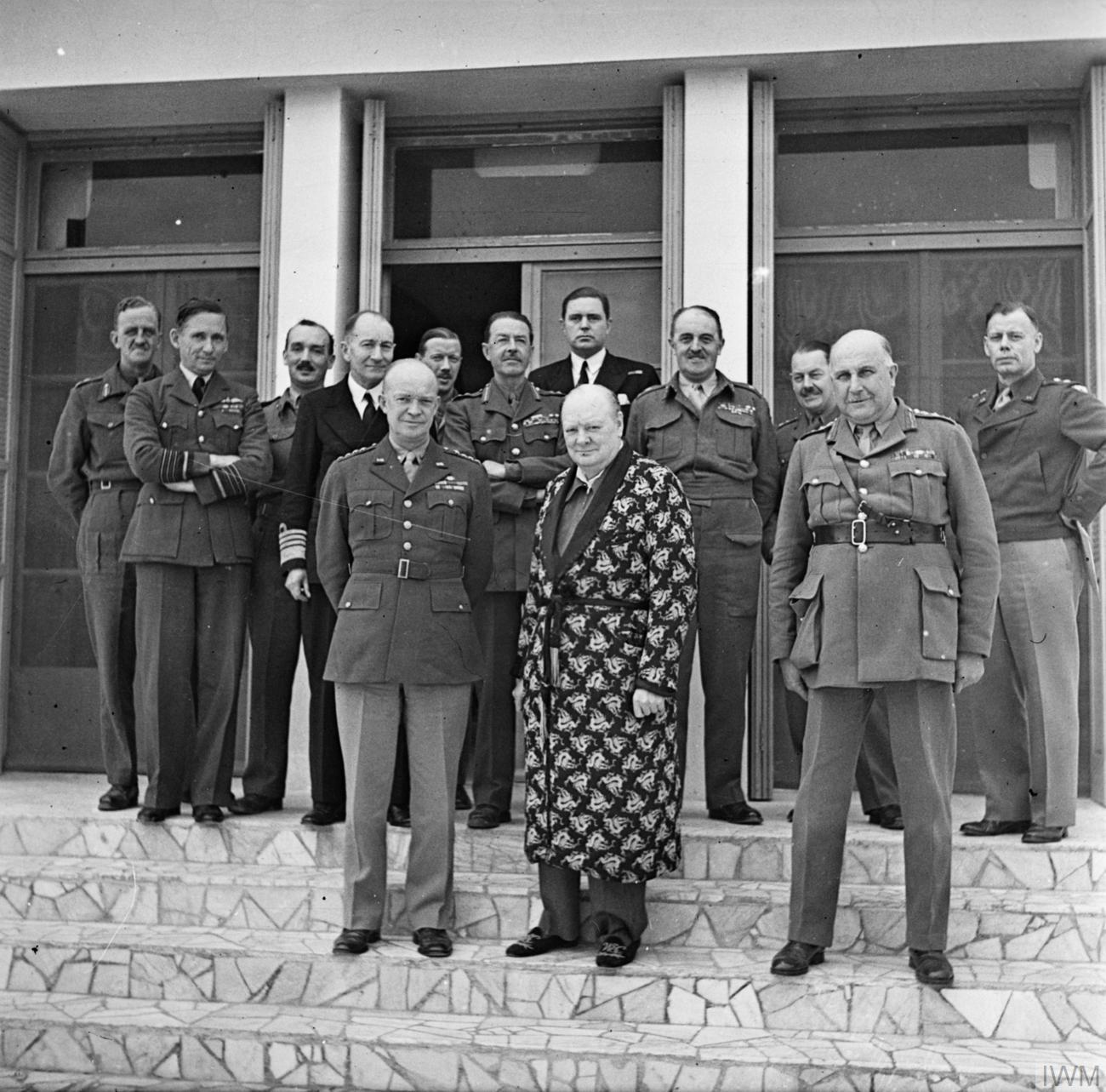
A convalescent Winston Churchill meets the outgoing and incoming Supreme Commanders in the Mediterranean, Dwight D. Eisenhower, to Churchill's right, and Henry Maitland Wilson, to his left. Behind them stand (from left to right), John Whiteley, Air Marshal Arthur Tedder, Brigadier G. S. Thompson, Admiral Sir John Cunningham, unknown, Sir Harold Alexander, Captain M. L. Power, Humfrey Gale, Leslie Hollis, and Eisenhower's chief of staff, Walter Bedell Smith.

Between the wars he attended the Royal Naval College, Greenwich, from 1927 to 1928, and later served on the staff of the Commander-in-Chief Africa Station and of the Plans Division at the Admiralty before being appointed assistant secretary of the Committee of Imperial Defence in 1936.

He served in the Second World War as senior assistant secretary in the War Cabinet Office. He was present at virtually every major decision during that period, attending all the major conferences—Washington, Cairo, Tehran, Yalta and Potsdam—and was instrumental in establishing what became known as the Cabinet War Rooms (now known the Churchill War Rooms).

After the war Hollis became deputy secretary (military) to the Cabinet in 1947 and Commandant General Royal Marines in 1949. He was credited with saving the Royal Marines from being disbanded and retired in July 1952.

== Bibliography ==
- Mead, Richard (2007). Churchill's Lions: a biographical guide to the key British generals of World War II. Stroud (UK): Spellmount. ISBN 978-1-86227-431-0.

Military offices
Preceded by Sir Dallas Brooks	Commandant General Royal Marines; 1949–1952	Succeeded by Sir John Westall
