= John Tedder, 2nd Baron Tedder =

English academic (1926–1994)

John Michael Tedder, 2nd Baron Tedder, FRSE FRSC (4 July 1926 – 18 February 1994) was a British academic who was the Purdie Professor of Chemistry at St. Andrews University, Scotland.

== Early life and education ==
He was born in London on 4 July 1926, the second born son of Arthur William Tedder and Rosalinde Maclardy. His father had a military career in the Royal Air Force, that culminated in his becoming Marshal of the Royal Air Force. As his father's military appointments involved frequent changes, the Tedder family's residences also shifted. He attended schools in Surrey, Whitgift School (1934–36), Sumatra in Indonesia (1936–38) and Dauntsey's School in Wiltshire (1938–44). He suffered with disabilities in both hearing and eyesight, and was rejected as a candidate for military service in the Second World War.

Tedder's early life was shaped by two significant tragedies. His older brother Dick was killed on active service in France in 1940. His mother, Rosalinde Tedder, died in January 1943 in an air crash in Egypt. His father was a witness to the air crash and was deeply affected by the death of his wife.

As Tedder was unfit to serve in military action, in 1944 he went to university to study chemistry. He studied at Magdalene College, Cambridge, for his undergraduate degree and, owing to the impact of the family tragedies, initially obtained poor grades. However, he persisted and was awarded a degree (B.A.) in 1947. He received encouragement from some of his lecturers and went on to receive both an M.A in 1951, and then his first doctorate (PhD) at Birmingham University in 1951. He undertook post-doctoral studies at Ohio State University from 1952–53. He subsequently obtained a second honorary doctorate (D.Sc.) from Birmingham University in 1961, and an honorary Sc. D. from the University of Cambridge in 1965.

== Career ==
Tedder became a lecturer in chemistry at Sheffield University in 1955, and in 1964 was appointed to the Roscoe Chair in Chemistry at Queen's College, Dundee, which in 1967 became the University of Dundee. He became Purdie Professor of Chemistry at St. Andrews University in 1969, and held the post until retiral 1989, thereafter retaining the title emeritus professor. In 1977 he submitted a paper to the Courts of the Universities of St Andrews and Dundee which called for the reunification of the two Universities, which had separated when Queen's College became the University of Dundee a decade earlier. Although this proposal was rejected it did lead to closer co-operation between the two institutions.

Tedder became an authority on a number of topics within the field of chemistry, and was the author or co-author of some 200 technical essays and several textbooks. One of his areas of expertise concerned organofluorine chemistry, and he pioneered the use of gas-liquid chromatography at Sheffield University in the 1950s. He composed a number of technical papers on the reactivity of orthoquinones. He developed a two-stage ion-beam spectrometer. He was also recognised by his peers as an important authority in free radical chemistry.

In addition to his distinguished work in chemistry, Tedder succeeded his father as baron and served in the House of Lords. Although he was apparently reluctant to perpetuate the title, he was persuaded by colleagues that the peerage system could benefit by the presence of a scientist and educator. He served on the House of Lords Committee on Hazardous Waste, and contributed to discussions in the House about matters of science and tertiary education.

In 1968 he was elected a Fellow of the Royal Society of Edinburgh. His proposers were Sir Edmund Hirst, Peter Pauson, Ralph Raphael, D. W. A. Sharp, Neil Campbell, Manfred Gordon, Patrick Dunbar Ritchie and Thomas Stevens Stevens.

In 1981, Tedder became a founding member of the World Cultural Council.

Tedder maintained a lively interest in the Royal Air Force and attended many honorary functions related to the squadrons in which his father had served. He also followed in his father's steps in his deep reading about Oliver Cromwell, and had planned to write a book on Cromwell. Tedder was also interested in classical music and played the piano. Near the end of his life he developed Parkinson's disease (the same affliction from which his father died). He then developed Alzheimer's disease, which forced him into retirement, and he was eventually placed in permanent nursing care until his death in 1994.

== Politics ==
In addition to his distinguished work in chemistry, Tedder succeeded his father as baron and served in the House of Lords. Although he was apparently reluctant to perpetuate the title, he was persuaded by colleagues that the peerage system could benefit by the presence of a scientist and educator. Having arrived as a crossbencher, he later joined the Social Democratic Party (SDP), and when the SDP merged with the Liberals in 1988 he instead joined David Owen's 'continuing' SDP, serving as that party's spokesman on higher education and science until it was dissolved in 1990. He also served on the House of Lords Committee on Hazardous Waste.

== Family ==
Tedder was married to Peggy Eileen Growcott, and they were the parents of two sons and a daughter. The elder son, Robin, is now the 3rd Baron Tedder.

== Arms ==
Coat of arms of John Tedder, 2nd Baron Tedder
Crest Issuant from an astral crown Or a lion sejant guardant Sable armed and langued Or holding in the sinister forepaw a sword enflamed as in the arms. Escutcheon Sable a sword enflamed palewise all Proper in chief an eagle affrontee volant head to sinister Or. Supporters Two representations of the God Horus all Proper. Motto For Freedom

== Publications ==
- Valence Theory (1966)
- Basic Organic Chemistry (1966)

== Obituaries ==
- Tam Dalyell, Obituary: Lord Tedder, dated 24 February 1994, at independent.co.uk
- Peter Pauson, (pdf) at Royal Society online

== Relevant biographical data ==
- See the biographical study of the 1st Baron Tedder (Arthur William Tedder) in Vincent Orange, Tedder: Quietly in Command (London/Portland: Frank Cass Publishers, 2004). ISBN 0-7146-4817-5
- Trinity College Library at the University of Cambridge holds in its archives correspondence between John Michael Tedder and Richard Laurence Millington Synge for the years 1967–74.

== Bibliography ==
- Valence Theory (with John N. Murrell and Sydney F. A. Kettle) (London and New York: John Wiley, 1965; revised 1969). ISBN 0-471-62688-0
- Basic Organic Chemistry (with Antony Nechvatal), 3 Vols. (London and New York: John Wiley, 1966–1970). ISBN 0-471-85013-6 (Revised in 1987) ISBN 0-471-90977-7
- The Chemical Bond (with John N. Murrell and Sydney F. A. Kettle) (Chichester and New York: John Wiley, 1978). ISBN 0-471-99577-0 (revised 1985). ISBN 0-471-90759-6
- Radicals (with D.C. Nonhebel and J.C.Walton) (Cambridge and New York: Cambridge University Press, 1979).
- Pictorial Orbital Theory (with Antony Nechvatal) (London and Marshfield: Pitman, 1985). ISBN 0-273-02265-2

Peerage of the United Kingdom
Preceded by Arthur Tedder	Baron Tedder; 1967–1994	Succeeded by Robin Tedder
