= Manley Laurence Power =

Royal Navy Admiral (1904–1981)

Admiral Sir Manley Laurence Power KCB CBE DSO* DL
- Born: 10 January 1904; Kingston, Surrey
- Died: 17 May 1981 (aged 77) Yarmouth, Isle of Wight
- Allegiance: United Kingdom
- Branch: Royal Navy
- Service years: 1917–1961
- Rank: Admiral
- Commands: HMS H32 (21 Apr 1933 – Jan 1934); HMS Severn (31 May 1937 – Apr 1939); HMS Opportune (9 Jun 1942 – Aug 1942); HMS Kempenfelt & Captain (D) 26th Destroyer Flotilla (24 Apr 1944 – Jun 1944); HMS Myngs (Jun 1944? – Nov 1944); HMS Saumarez (17 Nov 1944 – Jul 1945); HMS Osprey (Royal Naval Air Station, Portland) (4 May 1949 – May 1950); Flag Officer Aircraft Carriers (1956–1957); Commander-in-Chief, Portsmouth (HMS Victory) & Allied Commander-in-Chief, Channel & Commander-in-Chief, Home Station (Designate) (9 Mar 1959 – 1961)
- Conflicts: World War II: Operation Torch (landings in North Africa); Operation Husky (invasion of Sicily); Operation Shingle (landing at Anzio ); Operation Neptune (Normandy landings); Sinking of the Haguro; Suez Crisis
- Awards: KCB 12 June 1958; CB (9 June 1955); CBE (20 April 1943); OBE (1 January 1941); DSO (14 November 1944); DSO (10 July 1945); Mentioned in Despatches (21 Dec 1943 and 6 Jun 1944); Legion of Merit (19 March 1946); Croix de Guerre (5 April 1958)
- Other work: County Court, Isle of Wight (1964–1974); Deputy Lieutenant, Hampshire (1965–1974); Deputy Lieutenant, Isle of Wight (1974)

Admiral Sir Manley Laurence Power, KCB, CBE, DSO & Bar, DL (10 January 1904 – 17 May 1981) was a Royal Navy admiral who fought in World War II as a captain and later rose to more senior ranks, including the NATO position Allied Commander-in-Chief, Channel. One of his chief accomplishments was leading the 26th Destroyer Flotilla into the Malacca Strait during Operation Dukedom to sink the Japanese cruiser Haguro.

== Early career ==
Born the son of Admiral Sir Laurence E. Power KCB, CVO, Power was educated at the Royal Naval Colleges at Osborne and Dartmouth, becoming a Royal Navy officer cadet in 1917. In the early part of his career, he served mainly in submarines, attaining his first command (HMS H32) in 1933.

== World War II ==
In 1939 he was promoted to Commander and appointed as Staff Officer (Operations) to the Commander-in-Chief, Mediterranean, Vice-Admiral Sir Andrew Cunningham.

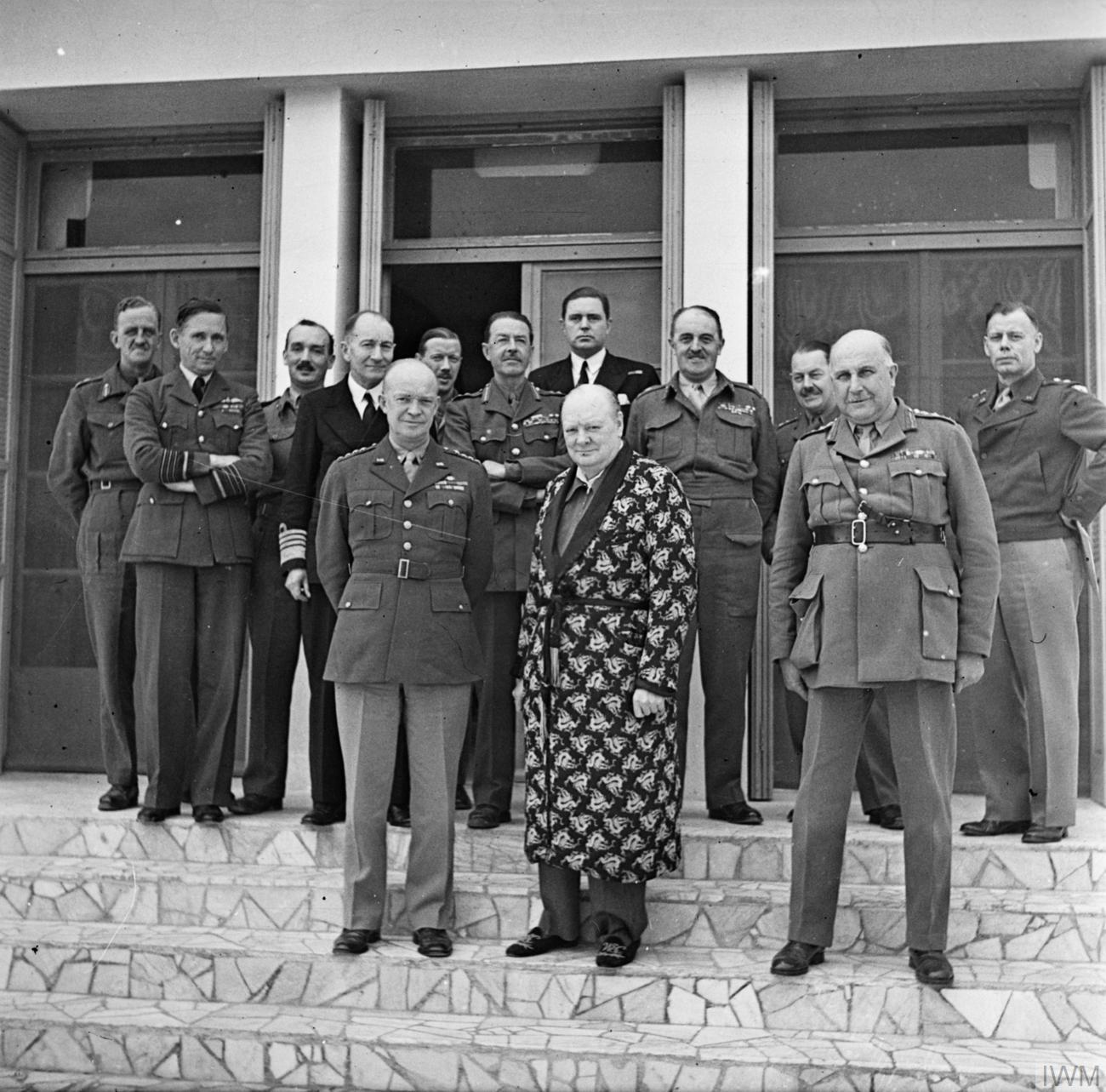
A convalescent Winston Churchill meets the outgoing and incoming Supreme Commanders in the Mediterranean, Dwight D. Eisenhower, to Churchill's right, and Henry Maitland Wilson, to his left. Behind them stand (from left to right), John Whiteley, Air Marshal Arthur Tedder, Brigadier G. S. Thompson, Admiral Sir John Cunningham, unknown, Sir Harold Alexander, Captain M. L. Power, Humfrey Gale, Leslie Hollis, and Eisenhower's chief of staff, Walter Bedell Smith.

In 1942, he was given command of HMS Opportune, escorting Arctic convoys, before returning as Staff Officer (Operations) in the Mediterranean in September 1942, in preparation for the invasion of North Africa and then became Staff Officer (Plans), on the staff of Commander-in-Chief, Mediterranean in January 1943, assisting the planning of the invasion of Sicily. He was promoted to Captain in 1943, and Deputy Chief of Staff (Plans), and stayed in the Mediterranean until March 1944, planning the invasion of Italy and the Anzio landings.

Power became captain of the 26th Destroyer Flotilla in April 1944, taking part in the Normandy landings, and as captain of the destroyer HMS Myngs participated in an action to destroy an enemy convoy off the Norwegian coast in November 1944. He was then appointed to command HMS Saumarez in the Eastern Fleet, and his flotilla destroyed the Japanese cruiser Haguro in May 1945.

== Post-war ==
Following the war, Power served as Deputy Director of Plans in the Admiralty between January and July 1946, then as Senior Naval Member of the Directing Staff at the Joint Services Staff College, later becoming commander of the Portland (Dorset) naval base. Following this he served as Flag Captain to the Commander-in-Chief, Home Fleet (Admiral Sir Philip Vian), then in May 1952 as Chief of Staff to the Commander-in-Chief Mediterranean (Admiral 1st Lord Mountbatten of Burma). He was promoted to rear-admiral in 1953, and in the following year was appointed Senior Naval Member of the Directing Staff of the Imperial Defence College. Promoted to vice-admiral, he became Flag Officer, Aircraft Carriers in 1956 and Deputy Chief of the Naval Staff and Fifth Sea Lord in 1957. Promoted to admiral in 1960, his final appointments were as Commander-in-Chief, Portsmouth and Allied Commander-in-Chief, Channel in 1959 before retiring in 1961.

== Family ==
He married Barbara Alice Mary Topham in 1930 and the couple had a daughter and a son.

== Honours and decorations ==
Knight Commander of the Order of the Bath (KCB)	12 June 1958
Companion of the Order of the Bath (CB)	9 June 1955
Commander of the Order of the British Empire (CBE)	20 April 1943 (Operation Torch – landings in N Africa 8 November 1942)
Officer of the Order of the British Empire (OBE)	1 January 1941
Companion of the Distinguished Service Order and Bar (DSO & Bar)	14 November 1944 (Operation Neptune – Normandy landings June 1944); 10 July 1945 (Operation Dukedom – destruction of a Japanese cruiser May 1945)
British War Medal	
Victory Medal	
1939–45 Star	
Africa Star	
Italy Star	
France and Germany Star	
War Medal 1939–1945 with palm for Mentioned in Despatches	21 December 1943 (Operation Husky – invasion of Sicily July 1943); 6 June 1944 (Operation Shingle – landing at Anzio 22 January 1944)
Queen Elizabeth II Coronation Medal	1952
Officer of the Legion of Merit (United States)	19 March 1946 (Staff Officer Planning C-in-C Mediterranean)
War Cross for foreign operational theaters (France)	15 April 1958 (Near East 1956)

Military offices
Preceded by Sir Alexander Bingley	Fifth Sea Lord; 1957–1959	Succeeded by Sir Laurence Durlacher
Preceded by Sir Guy Grantham	Commander-in-Chief, Portsmouth; 1959–1961	Succeeded by Sir Alexander Bingley
