= John Mitchell (RAF officer) =

RAF officer who served in World War I

- Born: 11 March 1888; Wilton, Scottish Borders
- Died: 2 January 1964 (aged 75); Isle of Guernsey
- Burial place: Isle of Guernsey
- Relatives: Agnes (wife); Charles; Adam; William Barrowman; Robina Lees
- Military career
- Allegiance: United Kingdom
- Branch: Royal Air Force
- Conflicts: First World War; North Russia Intervention
- Awards: Distinguished Service Order; Distinguished Flying Cross; Order of St Vladimir, 4th Class with Swords; Order of St Stanislaus, 2nd Class with Swords; Cross of St George, 4th Class

Lieutenant John Mitchell, DSO, DFC (11 March 1888 – 2 January 1964) was a Royal Air Force (RAF) officer who served in World War I and the Allies' North Russia Intervention.

== Early life ==
He was born in Wilton, Scottish Borders to Charles & Mary Ann. He was the fourth of seven children. Before the war he was a Police Constable in the English county of Durham.

== Military career ==
John Mitchell disembarked from Novorossisk, Russia on 25 June 1919 as part of a Royal Air Force air support group. On 30 July 1919 he was part of a reconnaissance mission of three de Havilland DH.9A planes of the RAF's No. 47 Squadron over southern Russia. While on their mission, ground fire punched holes in the fuel tank of the DH.9A of Flight Lieutenant Walter Anderson and observer officer Mitchell. Mitchell climbed onto the wing and plugged the holes with his fingers. When another DH.9A was forced down by anti-aircraft fire, Anderson and Mitchell landed to pick up its crew, Captain Eliot (Future Air Chief Marshal Sir William Elliot) and Lieutenant Laidlaw. Mitchell was still on the wing so Laidlaw took over the plane's Lewis machine gun in the rear cockpit and was able to hold off charging Bolshevik cavalry. Anderson was able to get their plane to take off again with Mitchell holding onto the wing to plug the fuel tank's hole with his fingers. Despite being burned by the aircraft's exhaust, they returned safely to base with the rescued crew.

On 30th July, 1919, near Cherni Yar (Volga), these officers were pilot and observer respectively, on a D.H. 9 machine, which descended to an altitude of 1,000 feet to take oblique photographs of the enemy's position. A second machine of the same flight which followed as escort was completely disabled by machine-gun fire and forced to land five miles behind the enemy's foremost troops. Parties of hostile cavalry which attempted to capture the pilot and observer of the crashed machine were kept away by the observer's Lewis gun whilst the pilot burnt the machine.

Flight Lieut. Anderson, notwithstanding that his petrol tank had been pierced by a machine-gun bullet, landed alongside the wrecked aeroplane, picked up the pilot and observer, and got safely home.

The risk involved in attempting this gallant rescue was very great, as had any accident occurred in landing the fate of all four officers can only be conjectured. The difficult circumstances of the rescue will be fully appreciated when it is remembered that Observer Officer Mitchell had to mount the port plane to stop the holes in the petrol tank with his thumbs for a period of fifty minutes flying on the return journey.

— The London Gazette Supplement: 31847

Mitchell was only dressed in shorts and a drill tunic but was still able to hold onto the plane against a 100 miles per hour (160 km/h) slipstream. His fingers were not totally able to plug the holes in the fuel tank and it leaked all over his body. If a fire had sparked his fuel-soaked clothes on the plane, he would have been covered in flame. While burned from the exhaust, he still went flying the next day.

Anderson and Mitchell were to be nominated for the Victoria Cross, but supporting documentation was lost during the evacuation from Russia. Instead of the Victoria Cross, the two received the Distinguished Service Order and later the Distinguished Flying Cross for their actions.

On 6 August 1919 Mitchell was shot from the ground and hospitalized while flying as an observer to Captain Anderson in DH9 D2942. He embarked to the United Kingdom on 28 March 1920. In June 1923 he transferred to the RAF Reserve and completed his service on 5 June 1929.

== Later life and death ==
He left his wife after the wife and moved to Canada where he worked as a mechanic at Rolls-Royce in Halifax, Canada before meeting his second wife, Minnie LaRue who was from the Isle of Guernsey. The two married and returned to Guernsey. During World War II the islands were occupied by Nazi troops. The occupying German forces deported over 1,000 Guernsey residents, including Mitchell, to camps in southern Germany, notably to the Lager Lindele (Lindele Camp) near Biberach an der Riß and to Laufen. He returned after the war. John Mitchell died on 2 January 1964 on the Isle of Guernsey of coronary thrombosis and arteriosclerosis.

== Bibliography ==
Notes

References

- Dobson, Christopher; Miller, John (1986). The Day They Almost Bombed Moscow: The Allied War in Russia, 1918-1920. New York: Atheneum. ISBN 9780689117138. - Total pages: 288
- Cooksley, Peter G. (2000). The RFC/RNAS Handbook, 1914-1918. Sutton Publishing. ISBN 9780750921695. - Total pages: 208
- The London Gazette (30 March 1920). "Distinguished Conduct Medal announcements in the Fifth Supplement to the London Gazette 31128". The London Gazette. London, UK: Government of the United Kingdom. ISSN 0374-3721. OCLC 6672113.
- Halliday, Hugh A. (8 January 2008). "Canadians Against The Bolsheviks: Air Force, Part 25". Legion Magazine. Archived from the original on 30 July 2019.
- Smith, John T. (2010). Gone to Russia to Fight: The RAF in South Russia 1918-1920. Amberley Publishing Limited. ISBN 9781445620343. - Total pages: 224
