= William Elliot (RAF officer) =

Royal Air Force Air Chief Marshal (1896-1971)

Sir William Elliot
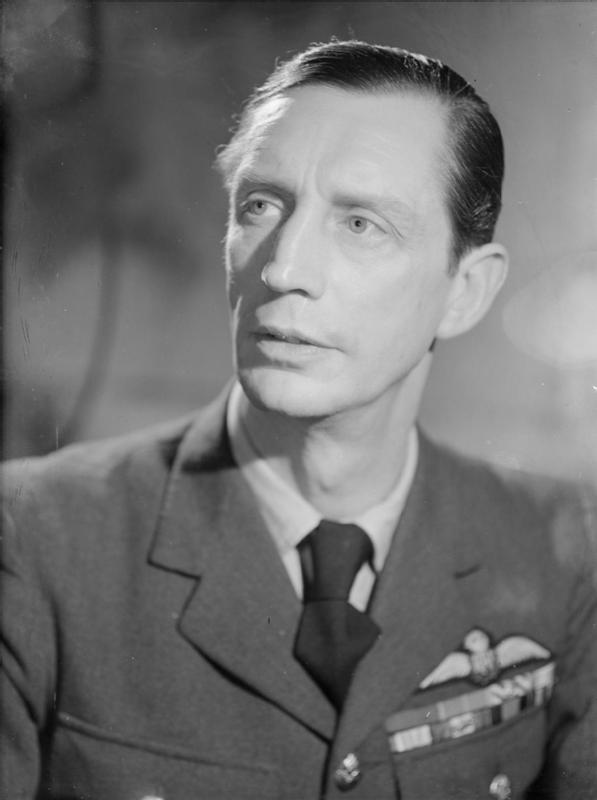
- William Elliot as Air Officer Commanding RAF Gibraltar during the Second World War
- Born: 3 June 1896
- Died: 27 June 1971 (aged 75)
- Spouse: Rosemary Chancellor
- Military career
- Allegiance: United Kingdom
- Branch: British Army (1915–1918); Royal Air Force (1918–1954)
- Service years: 1915–1954
- Rank: Air Chief Marshal
- Commands: RAF Fighter Command (1947–1949); Balkan Air Force (1944–1945); RAF Gibraltar (1944); RAF Middle Wallop (1941); No. 501 Squadron (1932–1937)
- Conflicts: First World War; Second World War
- Awards: Knight Grand Cross of the Royal Victorian Order; Knight Commander of the Order of the Bath; Knight Commander of the Order of the British Empire; Distinguished Flying Cross & Bar; Order of St. Vladimir, 4th Class with Sword and Bow (Russia); Order of St. George, 4th Class (Russia); Commander of the Legion of Merit (United States); Grand Cross of the Order of the Phoenix (Greece)

Air Chief Marshal Sir William Elliot, GCVO, KCB, KBE, DFC & Bar (3 June 1896 – 27 June 1971) was a senior Royal Air Force commander.

== Early life and education ==
Elliot was born on 3 June 1896 to Gilbert John Elliot, a schoolteacher, and Bessie Clark Davidson at Forgan in Fife, Scotland. He was educated both in Switzerland and, between 1910 and 1914, at Tonbridge School in the United Kingdom.

== RAF career ==
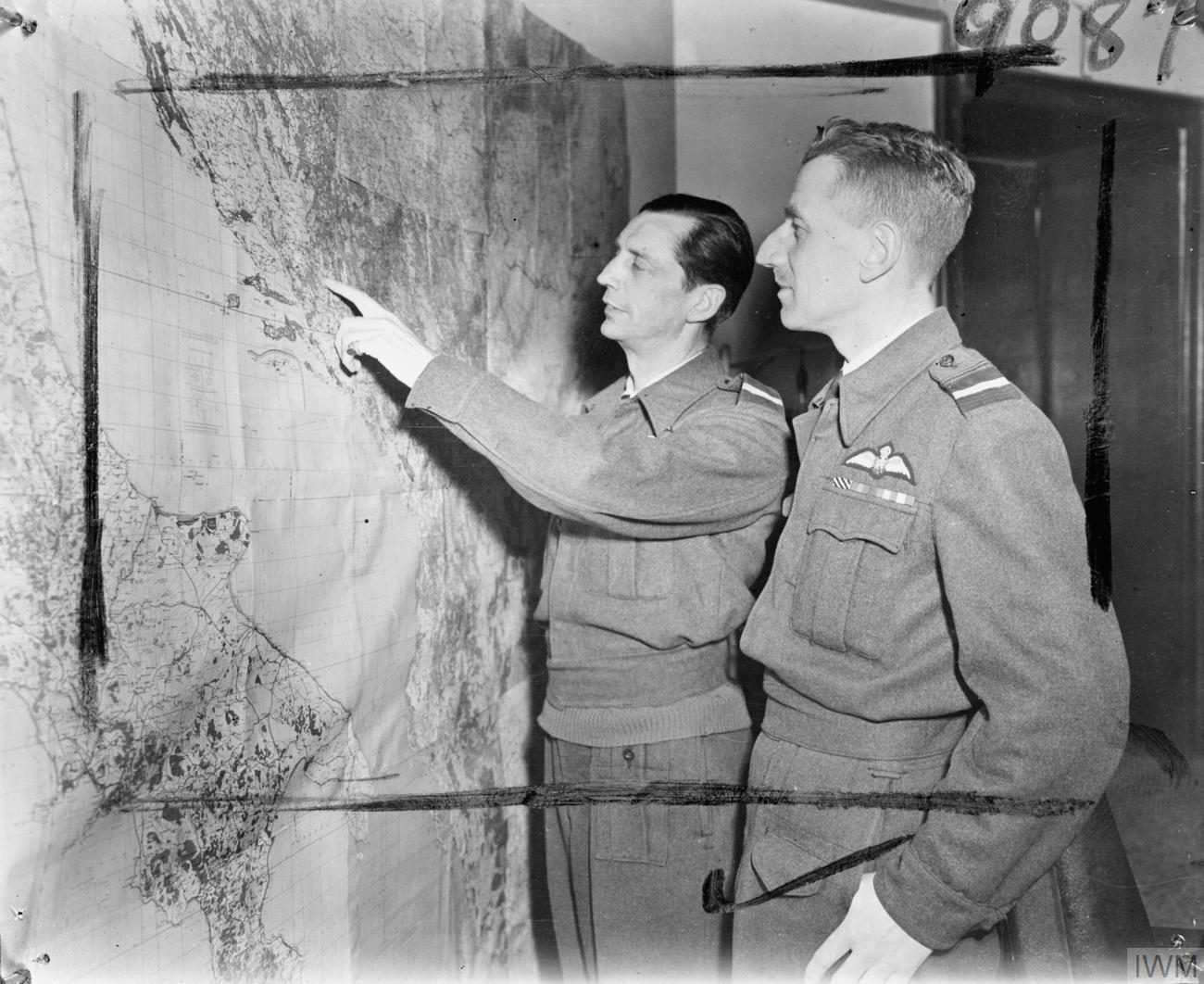
Air Vice Marshal W Elliot, the former Air Officer Commanding the Balkan Air Force (left), gives the latest information regarding Balkan operations to his successor, Air Vice Marshal George Mills (right) at BAF Headquarters, Bari, Italy, 1945

Elliot joined the Army Service Corps in 1915 and then transferred to the Royal Flying Corps in 1917.

On 30 July 1919 Elliot, then a captain, crashed behind enemy lines while fighting the Bolshevik forces during the North Russia Intervention. Another plane crewed by Lt John Mitchell and Captain Walter Anderson landed and picked up Elliot and flew him and his observer back to the base. He was appointed Officer Commanding No. 501 Squadron in 1932 before becoming Assistant Secretary to Committee of Imperial Defence in 1937 and being made Assistant Secretary of the War Cabinet Secretariat in 1939. He served in the Second World War as Officer Commanding RAF Middle Wallop and as a member of the Air Staff responsible for Night Defences at Headquarters RAF Fighter Command in 1941 and then as Director of Plans at the Air Ministry in 1942. He continued has war service as Air Officer Commanding RAF Gibraltar and then as Air Officer Commanding the RAF's Balkan Air Force during 1944 until he was made Assistant Chief Executive at the Ministry of Aircraft Production in March 1945.

After the War he served as Assistant Chief of the Air Staff (Policy) and then became Air Officer Commanding-in-Chief at RAF Fighter Command in 1947. He was knighted on 1 January 1946. He went on to be Chief Staff Officer to the Minister of Defence in 1949 and Chairman of the British Joint Services Mission to Washington, D.C. and UK Representative on the NATO Standing Group in 1951 before he retired in 1954.

== Family ==
In 1931 he married Rosemary Chancellor, daughter of Sir John Chancellor. Sir William and Lady Elliot had a daughter, Louise, and a son, Simon. In 1970, Louise married Stephen Simmons Halsey, an American corporate executive with American Express; over the course of their lives they have resided in New York City, Paris, Hong Kong, Hawaii, and Oregon. In 1972, Simon married Annabel, the daughter of Bruce Shand and sister of Queen Camilla.

Military offices
New title Air force established	Air Officer Commanding the Balkan Air Force; 1944–1945	Succeeded by George Mills
Preceded by Sir James Robb	Commander-in-Chief Fighter Command; 1947–1949	Succeeded by Sir Basil Embry
Preceded by Lord Tedder	Chief of the British Joint Staff Mission to Washington; 1951–1953	Succeeded by Sir John Whiteley
New title	UK Military Representative to NATO; 1951–1953	Succeeded by Sir John Whiteley
