= Francis Grenfell =

Francis Grenfell may refer to:

- Francis Grenfell, 1st Baron Grenfell (1841–1925), British Field Marshal
- Francis Octavius Grenfell (1880–1915), British Army officer and Victoria Cross recipient; nephew of Baron Grenfell
