= Lord Wilson =

Lord Wilson may refer to:

- Baron Wilson, a hereditary title created in 1946
  - Henry Maitland Wilson, 1st Baron Wilson (1881–1964), British field marshal
- Nicholas Wilson, Lord Wilson of Culworth (born 1945), justice of the Supreme Court of the United Kingdom
- Richard Wilson, Baron Wilson of Dinton (born 1942), British civil servant and politician
- Paul Wilson, Baron Wilson of High Wray (1908–1980), British engineer and administrator
- Henry Wilson, Baron Wilson of Langside (1916–1997), Scottish lawyer and politician
- Harold Wilson, Baron Wilson of Rievaulx (1916–1995), Prime Minister of the United Kingdom from 1964 to 1970 and from 1974 to 1976
- Phil Wilson, Baron Wilson of Sedgefield (born 1959), British Labour Party politician
- David Wilson, Baron Wilson of Tillyorn (born 1935), Scottish administrator, diplomat and Sinologist
