= Frederick Stephenson (British Army officer) =

British Army general

General Sir Frederick Stephenson GCB
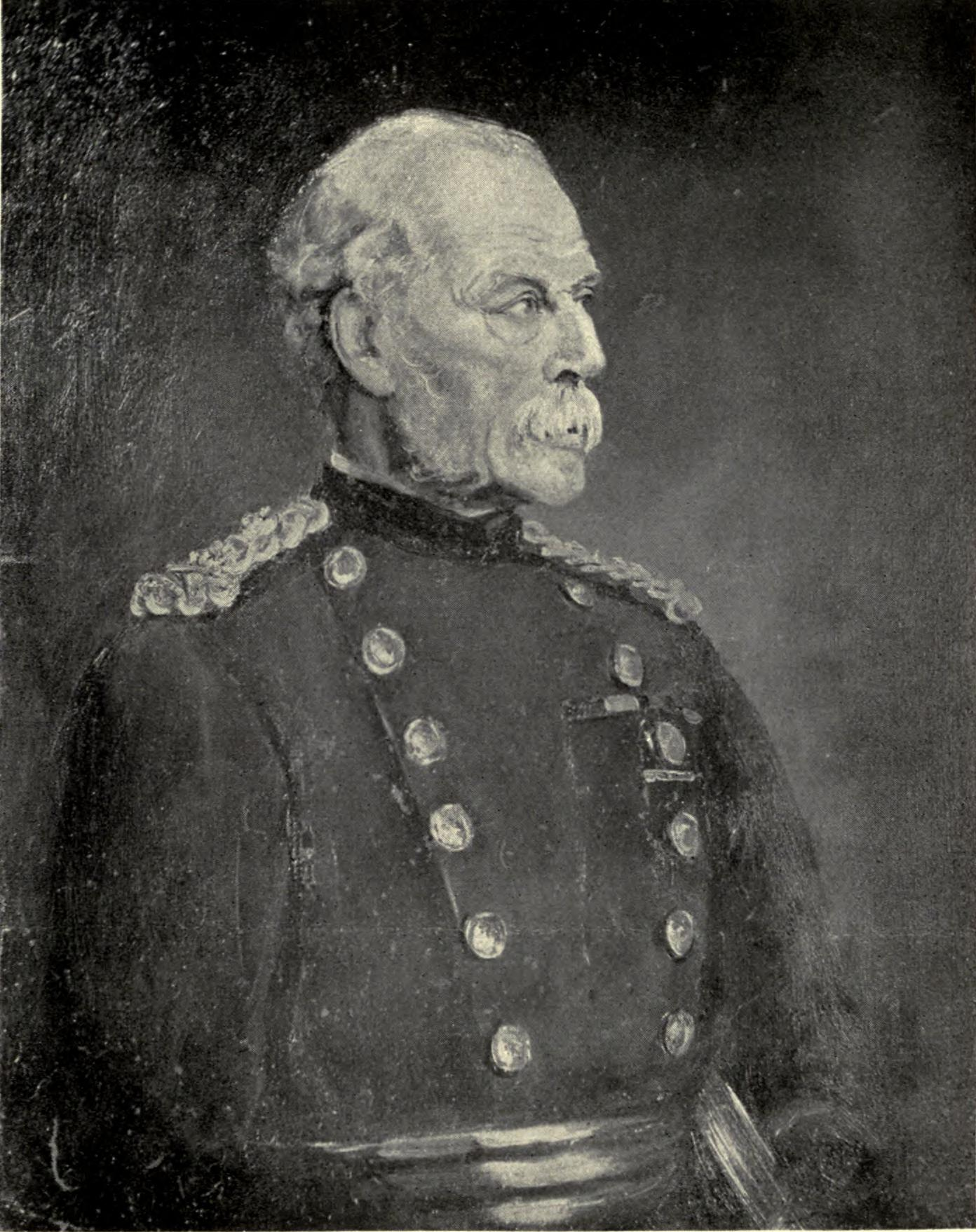
- Oil sketch by Lady Munro
- Born: 17 July 1821
- Died: 10 March 1911 (aged 89)
- Military career
- Allegiance: United Kingdom
- Branch: British Army
- Rank: General
- Commands: Home District; British Troops in Cairo
- Conflicts: Crimean War; Second Opium War; Mahdist War
- Awards: Knight Grand Cross of the Order of the Bath

General Sir Frederick Charles Arthur Stephenson, GCB (17 July 1821 – 10 March 1911) was a senior British Army officer who served as Major General commanding the Brigade of Guards and General Officer Commanding the Home District from 1876 to 1879.

== Military career ==
The second son of Major-General Sir Benjamin C. Stephenson, Stephenson was commissioned into the Scots Guards in 1837. He fought in the Crimean War and took part in the expeditions to China in 1858 and 1860 during the Second Opium War.

He was appointed acting Inspector-General of the Auxiliary Forces in 1873 and made Major General commanding the Brigade of Guards and General Officer Commanding the Home District in 1876.

He became Commander-in-Chief of the British Army of Occupation in Cairo in 1883 during the Mahdist War. He also led the Frontier Force and defeated the Dervish Army at the Battle of Ginnis in Sudan in 1885.

In retirement he was Constable of the Tower from 1898 to 1911.

Military offices
Preceded by Prince Edward	GOC Home District; 1876–1879	Succeeded by Sir George Higginson
New title	GOC British Troops in Egypt; 1883–1888	Succeeded by Sir James Dormer
Honorary titles
Preceded by Hon. Sir Arthur Hardinge	Colonel of the Coldstream Guards; 1892–1911	Succeeded by Lord William Seymour
Preceded by Sir Daniel Lysons	Constable of the Tower of London; 1898–1911	Succeeded by Sir Evelyn Wood
