= Battle of Ginnis =

Battle in the Mahdist War

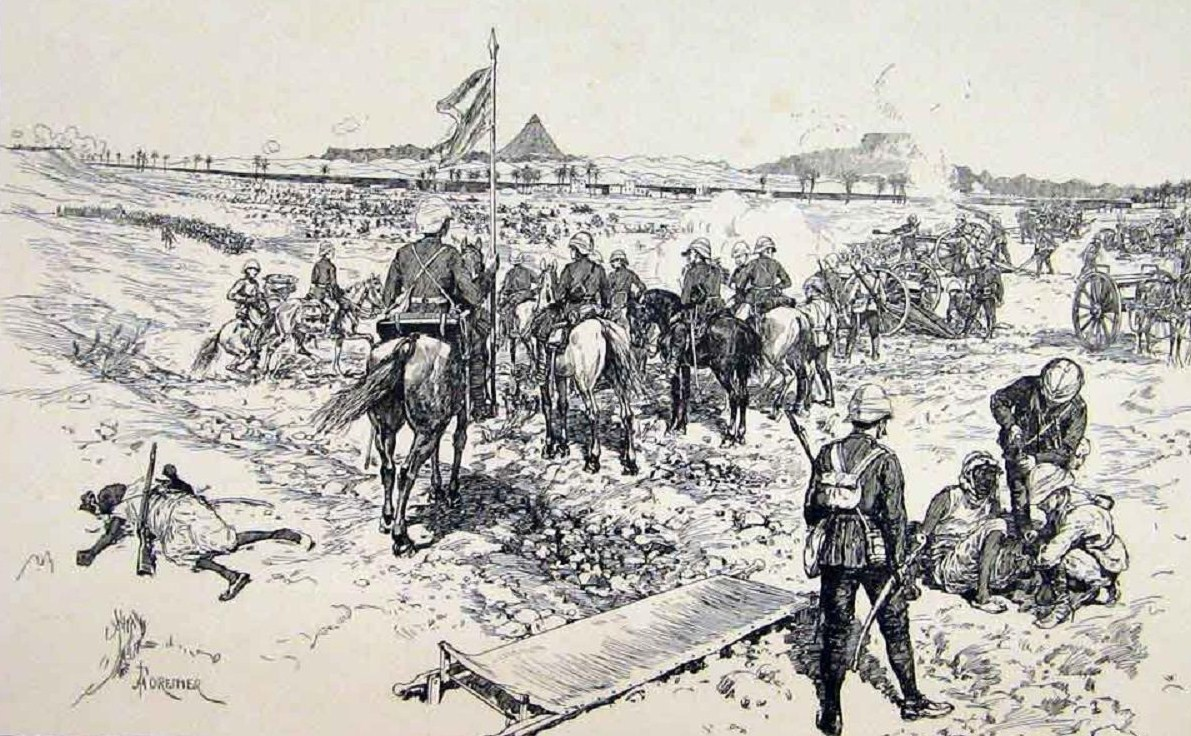
- Battle of Ginnis from The Illustrated London News
Date	30 December 1885
Location	Ginis, Sudan; 20.82047°N 30.49446°E
Result	British victory

Belligerents
United Kingdom	Mahdist State

Commanders and leaders
Francis Grenfell	unknown

Strength
3,500	6,000

Casualties and losses
10 killed 41 wounded	400 killed, many more wounded

The Battle of Ginnis (also known as the Battle of Gennis) was a minor battle of the Mahdist War that was fought on December 30, 1885, between soldiers of the Anglo-Egyptian Army and warriors of the Mahdist State. The battle was caused by the Mahdist blockade of the Ginnis-Kosha Fort, which British commanders hoped to relieve.

The fighting resulted in a British victory that is principally remarkable as the last battle that was certainly fought by the British Army in red coats, although a Maxim battery from the Connaught Rangers may have fought in red at the Battle of Ferkeh in 1896.

== Background ==
=== Situation ===
In 1884, a Sudanese Islamic religious leader and self proclaimed Mahdi, Muhammad Ahmad, planned and executed a series of attacks that left a British general, William Hicks, and thousands of ill-trained Egyptian soldiers dead at the hands of his supporters who he called the Ansār. Sudan was controlled by an Anglo-Egyptian administration. After it was decided that something must be done, General Charles Gordon was sent by the British government to be the Egyptian Army's Governor-General there. Gordon and his aide, Colonel John Donald Hamill Stewart, carried orders from both governments to evacuate the town of Khartoum from the Mahdi. Instead, Gordon built up the town's defenses and prepared for a siege. The British government sent two relief columns, the slow River Column and the mobile Desert Column, to rescue Gordon, Stewart and the Egyptian garrison. After both columns won hard-fought battles in Kirbekan and Abu Klea, respectively, Stewart was found to have been killed by wandering Arabs north of Khartoum after his steamboat ran aground, and Khartoum was found to have fallen. Gordon was killed, and the columns retreated, leaving behind a series of forts.

One of the forts was near the towns of Kosha and Ginnis, in northern Sudan, where a detachment of Cameron Highlanders and Egyptian-Sudanese troops from the Ninth Sudanese Battalion were stationed. Thousands of Mahdist warriors, led by their provincial amirs, began raiding in the vicinity of Ginnis. They besieged the fort, the garrison's Gardner gun was once dismounted by a Mahdist artillery barrage. General Evelyn Wood, the British commander in Egypt and the sirdar (commander) of the Egyptian Army, became concerned about the siege and the raids and ordered Major General Francis Grenfell, with a force of two infantry brigades and a cavalry brigade, to rid the area of Mahdists.

=== Grenfell's force ===
The First Brigade consisted of the First Berkshires, the West Kent Regiment, the Second Durham Light Infantry, an Egyptian artillery battery escorted by 60 Egyptian troops and a Royal Engineer detachment. The brigade was commanded by Brigadier General Butler. Colonel Huyshe's Second Brigade was composed of the Yorkshire Regiment, six companies of the Cameron Highlanders, 152 Sudanese soldiers, 278 men of the 1st Egyptian Battalion, a mule battery of the Royal Artillery and detachments from both the British Camel Corps and its Egyptian counterpart. Three Gardner guns were also brought along by the Second Brigade. The cavalry brigade, led by Colonel Blake, was formed by another detachment of the Egyptian Camel Corps, a British Mounted Infantry company and 57 Egyptian cavalrymen. Some of the British troops were dressed in scarlet coats, but the Durham Light Infantry had left their red coats in Cairo before they headed south and were wearing khaki. The Egyptians were dressed in white or khaki. Some Egyptian officers preferred their traditional blue coat. British soldiers and officers wore white sun helmets, and the Egyptians wore red fezes.

== Battle ==
=== Opening clashes ===
At 5:00 on the morning of December 30, 1885, General Grenfell and his troops marched out of their bivouack, which was between the Ginnis-Kosha fort and a smaller fort further north (downstream) on the Nile. The First Brigade was at the head of the column, and the Camel Corps and Second Brigade followed. The Second Brigade took up positions overlooking Kosha, and the fort garrison, seizing the opportunity, sortied and stormed the town. On the Nile, the steamer Lotus, which had mounted a Gardner gun, reported that a large body of Mahdists were moving out of Ginnis in the direction of Grenfell's column. The Camerons and Sudanese, followed by the Second Brigade and covered by the Lotus, moved to investigate and counter the threat.

=== Main battle ===
As the Second Brigade fought through the palm groves near Ginnis, Mahdist riflemen fired several volleys at the First Brigade. Although the firing was inaccurate, the smoke that it created allowed spearmen to surprise the Camel Corps. In the ensuing skirmish, that detachment was forced to withdraw, but the Durham Light Infantry moved forward and repulsed the Mahdist attack.

As the First Brigade prepared to attack the main Mahdist camp near Ginnis, the Second Brigade entered the town itself. Fighting their way through the streets, they took control of it. Nearby, the First Brigade's attack forced the Mahdists to retreat from their camp and pull back into the Atab Defile. Grenfell then ordered Colonel Blake's cavalry brigade to dislodge the Arabs in the Defile. After the Mounted Infantry took the Atab Defile with a bayonet charge, a general pursuit began, but Blake halted his men and the Mahdists fled to the desert.

As the First Egyptian Battalion marched through Kosha, the men noticed that some of the Mahdists, probably seeking shelter during the retreat from the town, had holed up, with their weapons, in a house. With a screw gun from the Mule Battery covering them, the Egyptians stormed the house. That encounter marked the end of the battle.

== Aftermath ==
The Anglo-Egyptian victory at Ginnis effectively ended the First Sudan Campaign and the first third of the Mahdist War, which had begun with the destruction of an Egyptian force near Fashoda in 1881. A few more campaigns, mainly defensive or relief operations, were fought until a large Anglo-Egyptian army, commanded by both Sirdar Sir Herbert Kitchener, a former intelligence officer, and General Sir Reginald Wingate reconquered Sudan in a massive campaign from 1896 to 1898. Most Mahdist resistance ended after the large-scale Battle of Omdurman in 1898.
