= James Charlemagne Dormer =

British Army officer

Lieutenant-General The Honourable Sir James Dormer
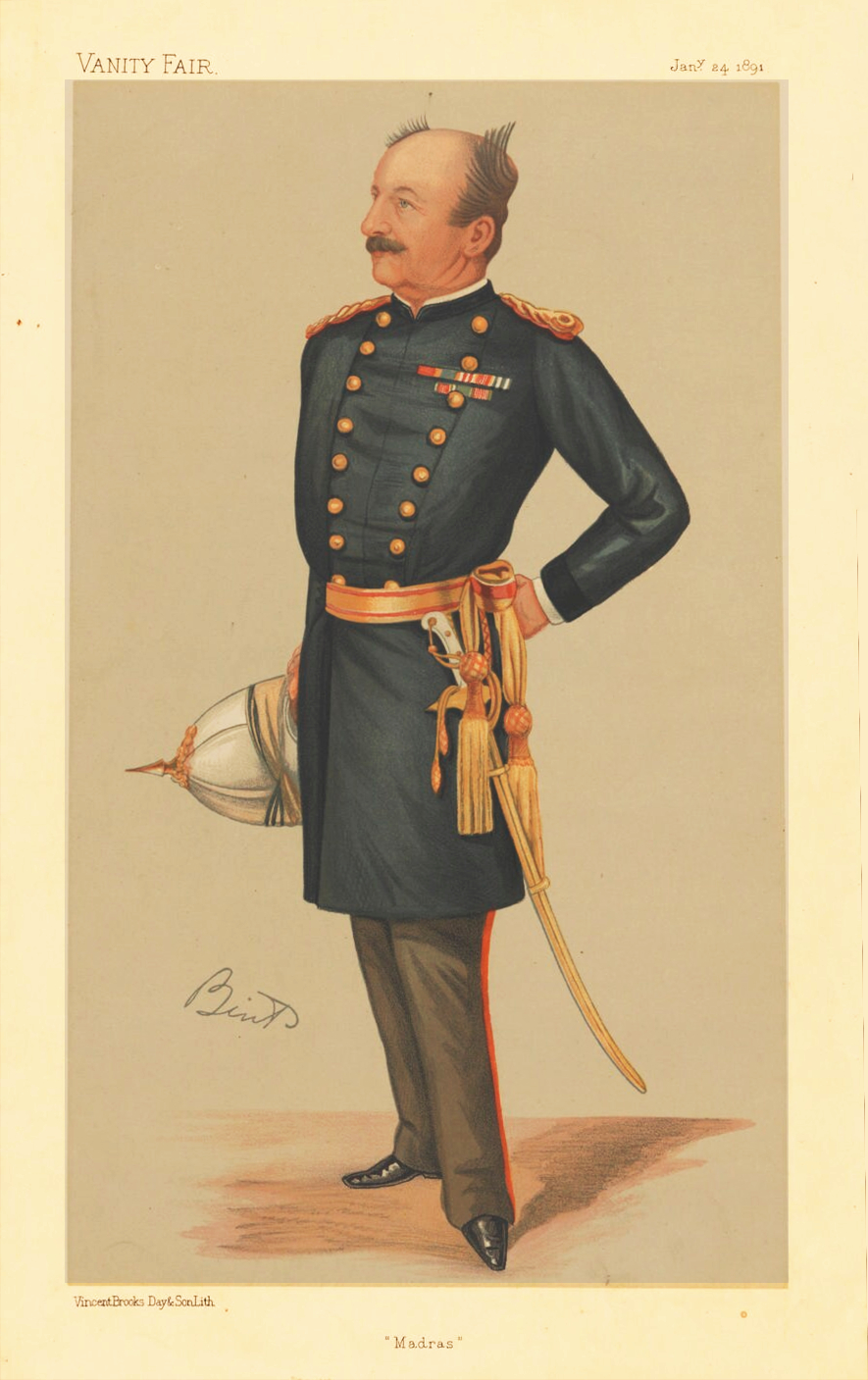
- "Madras" – Caricature by his daughter Mary Catherine Rees under the pseudonym "Bint" published in Vanity Fair in 1891
- Born: 26 January 1834
- Died: 3 May 1893 (aged 59)
- Military career
- Allegiance: United Kingdom
- Branch: British Army
- Rank: Lieutenant-General
- Commands: Madras Army
- Awards: Knight Commander of the Order of the Bath

Lieutenant General The Honourable Sir James Charlemagne Dormer KCB (26 January 1834 – 3 May 1893) was a British Army officer.

== Military career ==
Dormer was the younger son of Joseph Thaddeus Dormer, 11th Baron Dormer. He became Chief of Staff of the army of occupation in Egypt in 1882, Deputy Adjutant-General for auxiliary forces in 1885 and General Officer Commander commanding Dublin District in 1886. He went to command the British Troops in Egypt in 1888 and became Commander-in-Chief of the Madras Army and a Member of the Council of the Governor of Fort St George in 1891. He died from injuries on 3 May after being mauled by a tiger while on a hunt on 25 April 1893 in the Nilgiris. General Mansfield Clarke succeeded him as commander-in-chief of the Madras Army. His eldest son, Roland, succeeded his uncle as Baron Dormer.

== Sources ==
- The Plantagenet Roll of the Blood Royal: being a complete table of all the descendants now living of Edward III, King of England. The Anne of Exeter volume. Genealogical Pub. Co. 1994. p. 276. ISBN 0806314362.

Military offices
Preceded by Sir Frederick Stephenson	GOC British Troops in Egypt; 1888–1890	Succeeded by Sir Frederick Forestier-Walker
Preceded by Sir Charles Arbuthnot	C-in-C, Madras Army; 1891–1893	Succeeded by Sir Charles Clarke
