= Action of Elouges =

- Part of the Western Front of World War I
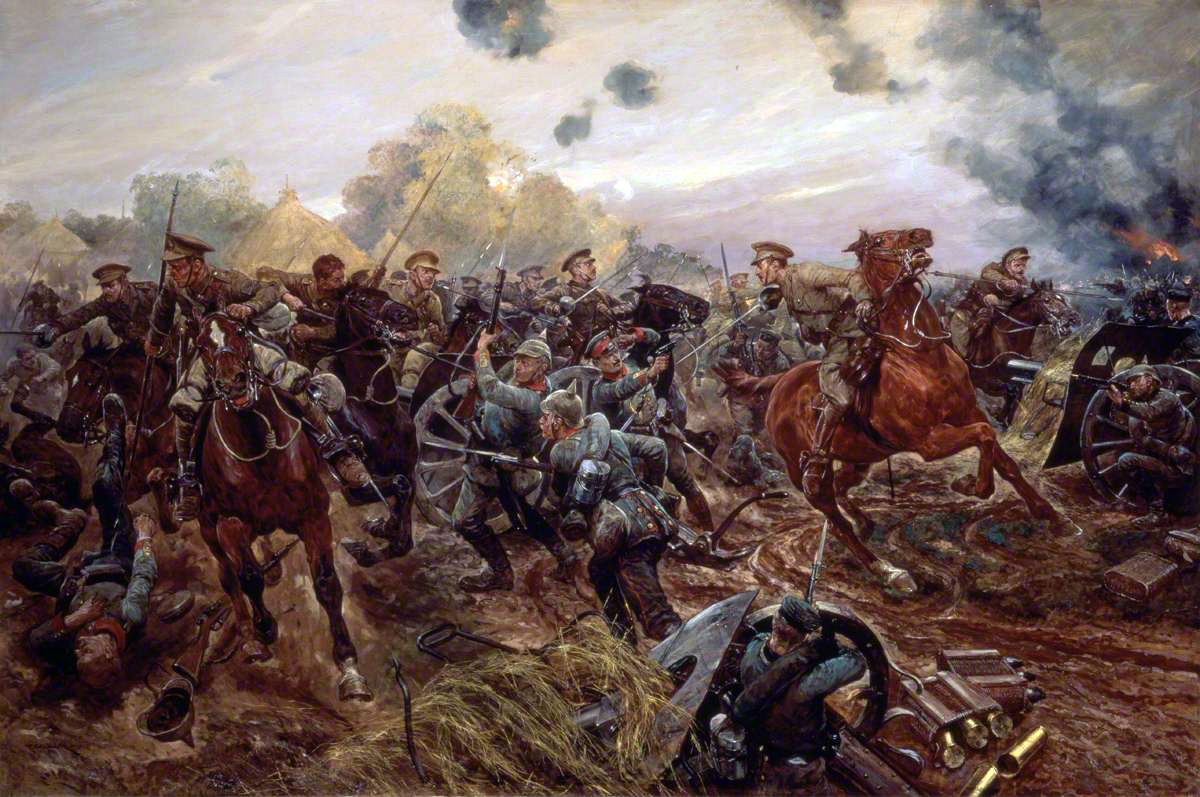
- 9th (Queen's Royal) Lancers charging German guns during the action of Elouges
Date	24 August 1914
Location	Elouge, Belgium and the surrounding countryside
Result	German victory

Belligerents
(United Kingdom of Great Britain and Ireland) British Empire	(German Empire) Germany

Units involved
5th Division	

Casualties and losses
250 dead or wounded 350 horses dead or wounded	Unknown

The action of Elouges on 24 August 1914 was fought during the First World War. Following the Battle of Mons the British Expeditionary Force was withdrawing, closely followed by the advancing German Army. The British 5th Division was assisted by the 2nd Cavalry Brigade and 3rd Cavalry Brigade.

During the action the 4th (Royal Irish) Dragoon Guards and 'A' Squadron, the 9th (Queen's Royal) Lancers charged the German guns. Major Ernest Alexander of the Royal Artillery and Captain Francis Grenfell of the 9th Lancers were awarded the Victoria Cross for saving an artillery battery while under fire. Eventually the 1st Battalion Cheshire Regiment was surrounded and destroyed.
