= Charles Knowles (British Army officer) =

British army officer (1835–1924)

Major-General Sir Charles Knowles KCB
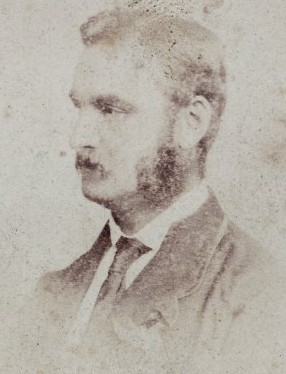
- Military career
- Allegiance: United Kingdom
- Branch: British Army
- Rank: Major-General
- Conflicts: Crimean War; Second Anglo-Afghan War
- Awards: Knight Commander of the Order of the Bath

Major-General Sir Charles Benjamin Knowles KCB (1835–1924) was a British Army officer.

== Military career ==
The son of John Knowles of Rugby, Warwickshire, he was commissioned into the 77th (East Middlesex) Regiment of Foot in February 1855. He saw action in the Crimean War in 1855 and served as commanding officer of the 67th (South Hampshire) Regiment of Foot at the Battle of Charasiab in October 1879 during the Second Anglo-Afghan War.

In April 1886 Knowles became Adjutant-General of the Bombay Army, where he was succeeded in 1890 by William Forbes Gatacre. That year he was promoted Major-General. He was commander of British troops in Malta in January 1892.

In October 1895 Knowles was made commander of the British Troops in Egypt. The appointment had a social dimension, and the Duke of Cambridge, Commander-in-Chief, had recommended Knowles or Reginald Thynne, on the grounds that they both had "very nice wives". In 1897 Knowles retired from the army.

Knowles was knighted in 1903. He served as colonel of the Hampshire Regiment from February 1908 to 1924.

== Family ==
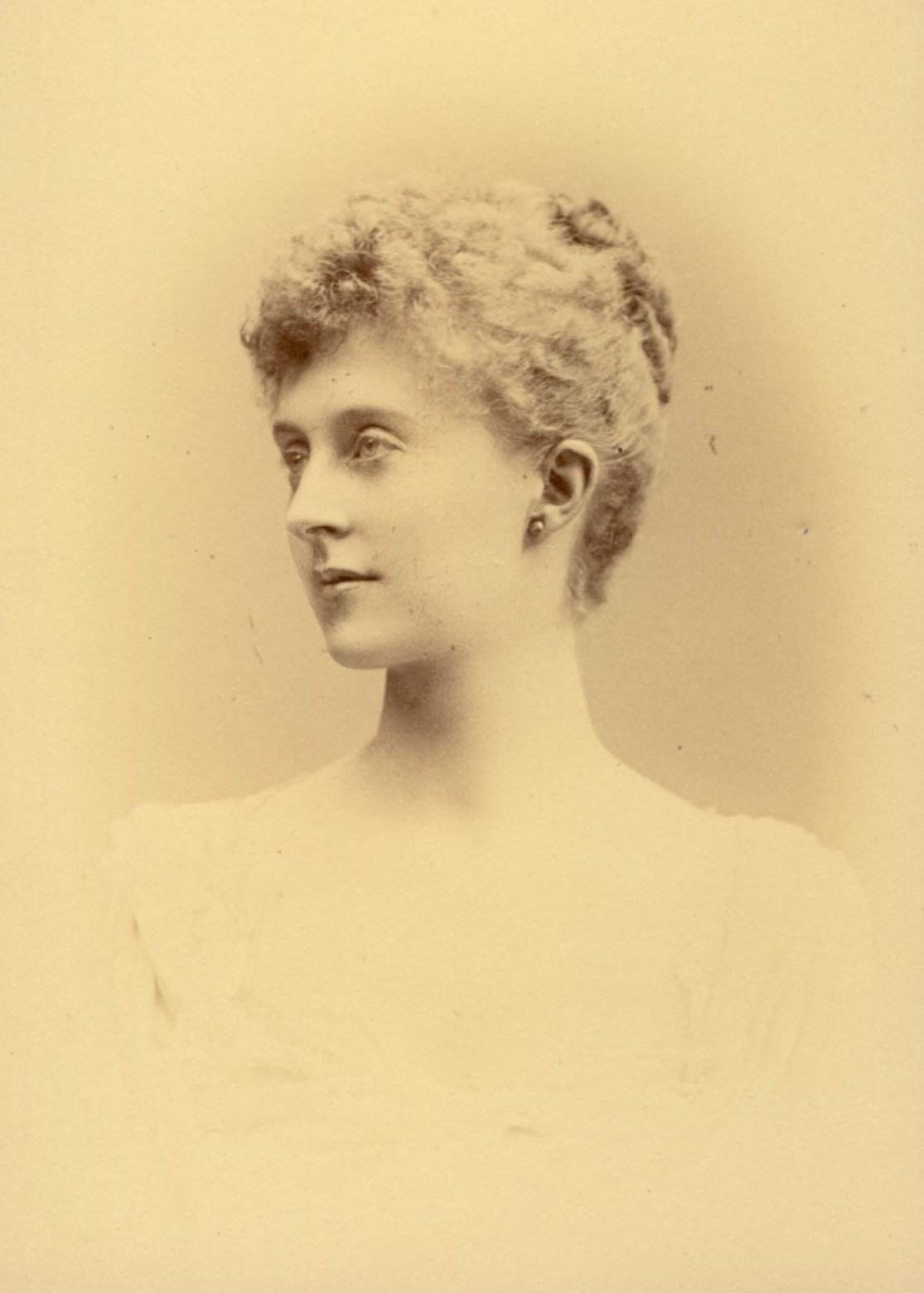
Constance Mary Elliott, about 1888

Knowles married in 1892 Constance Mary Elmslie. She was awarded an OBE and became a Dame of Grace, and in 1927 a Dame of Justice, of the Order of Saint John. Constance was a widow, having previously been married to the Rev. George Luther Elliott; their daughter Esme had married Francis Jearrad Bowker, who was ADC to Knowles in Malta.

Bowker was killed in the Mesopotamian Campaign, fighting at the Hanna defile on 21 January 1916; and Esme became involved in relief work for British prisoners of the Ottomans. Esme—an acronym nickname, for Edith Sophie Mary Elliott—remarried in 1922, to John Nicoll of Micheldever. Lady Constance Knowles died in 1931 at home in Camberley, an obituary notice appearing under the title "Fine Work for Red Cross and Ambulance. Commandant of Three Wartime Hospitals." From that time in the 1930s Esme was involved in restoring and adding to the Elliott family home at Egland, Awliscombe, now a listed building, working with the architect Walter Sarel.

Military offices
Preceded by Sir Frederick Forestier-Walker	GOC British Troops in Egypt; 1895–1897	Succeeded by Sir Francis Grenfell
