= Robert Stone (British Army officer) =

British general (1890–1974)

Lieutenant-General Robert Stone CB DSO MC
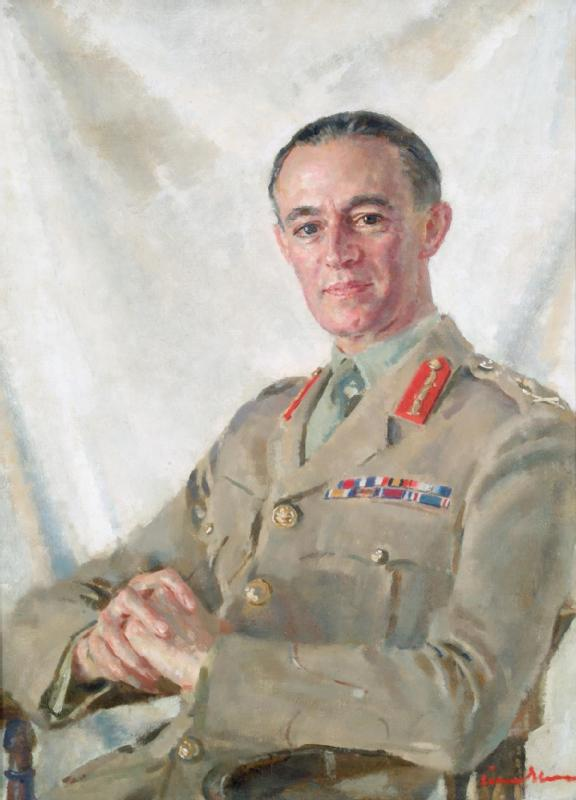
- Portrait by Simon Elwes
- Born: 16 January 1890; Dover, Kent, England
- Died: 27 June 1974 (aged 84)
- Military career
- Allegiance: United Kingdom
- Branch: British Army
- Service years: 1902−1947
- Rank: Lieutenant-General
- Service number: 4480
- Unit: Royal Engineers
- Commands: British Troops in Egypt
- Conflicts: Second Boer War; First World War; Second World War
- Awards: Companion of the Order of the Bath; Distinguished Service Order; Military Cross

Lieutenant-General Robert Graham William Hawkins Stone, CB, DSO, MC (16 January 1890 – 27 June 1974) was a senior British Army officer who became General Officer Commanding (GOC) British Troops in Egypt.

== Military career ==
As a child aged 12, Stone travelled to South Africa, enlisted in the District Mounted Troop, Aliwal North in early 1902, and fought as a private soldier in the Second Boer War.

Subsequently educated at Wellington College, Stone was commissioned into the Royal Engineers in December 1909. He served in the First World War in France, latterly as brigade major for 32nd Infantry Brigade.

After remaining in the army during the interwar period, he attended the Staff College, Camberley from 1923 to 1924, and became a general staff officer at the War Office in 1930, Commander Royal Engineers for Deccan District in India in 1934 and military attaché in Rome in 1935. He went on to be assistant commandant and chief of staff in Sudan in 1938.

Stone also served in the Second World War, initially as chief of British Mission to the Egyptian Army and then, from 1942 as general officer commanding the British Troops in Egypt. In this capacity he had to maintain control during a coup d'état that resulted in Ahmad Pasha becoming Prime Minister of Egypt in 1944 as well as a subsequent mutinies within the Egyptian Army.

He retired in 1947.

== Bibliography ==
- Smart, Nick (2005). Biographical Dictionary of British Generals of the Second World War. Barnsley, South Yorkshire: Pen and Sword Books. ISBN 1844150496.

Military offices
Preceded by William Holmes	GOC British Troops in Egypt; 1942−1944	Succeeded by Sir Charles Allfrey
