= William Holmes (British Army officer, born 1892) =

British Army general (1892–1969)

Lieutenant-General Sir William Holmes KBE CB DSO*
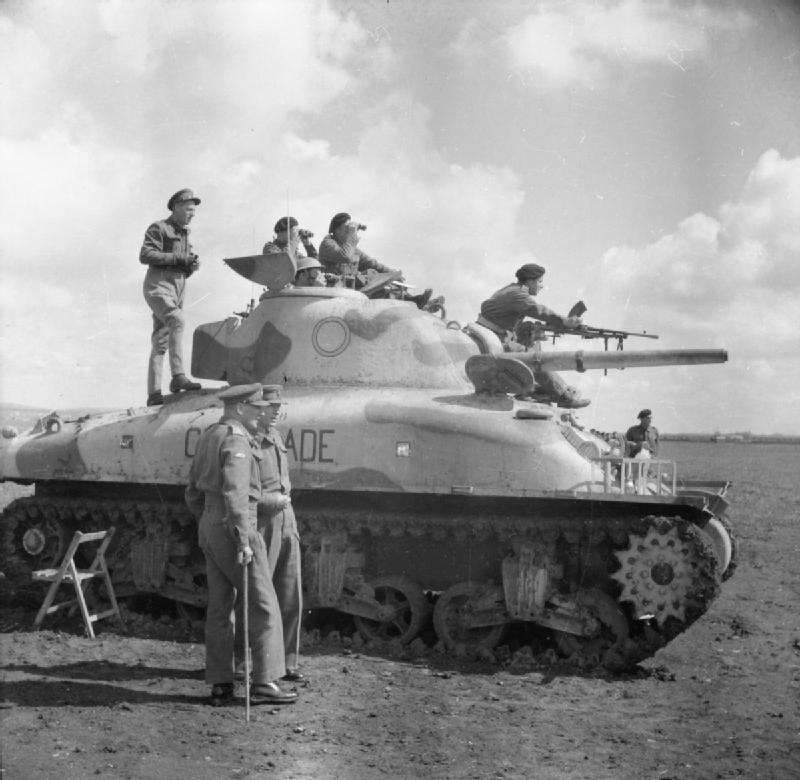
- Lieutenant-General William Holmes stands on a Sherman tank of the Royal Wiltshire Yeomanry, 5 April 1943
- Born: 20 August 1892; Westminster, London, England
- Died: 16 January 1969 (aged 76); Tucson Medical Center, Tucson, Arizona, United States
- Military career
- Allegiance: United Kingdom
- Branch: British Army
- Service years: 1911–1945
- Rank: Lieutenant-General
- Service number: 4613
- Units: Royal Welsh Fusiliers; East Lancashire Regiment
- Commands: Ninth Army (1942–45); British Troops in Egypt (1941–42); X Corps (1940–42); 42nd (East Lancashire) Infantry Division (1938–40); 8th Infantry Brigade (1935–37); 2nd Battalion, East Lancashire Regiment (1929–33); 1st Battalion, Royal Welsh Fusiliers (1916–19)
- Conflicts: First World War; Second World War
- Awards: Knight Commander of the Order of the British Empire; Companion of the Order of the Bath; Distinguished Service Order & Bar; Mentioned in Despatches (6); Silver Medal of Military Valor (Italy); Order of the Phoenix (Greece); Order of Polonia Restituta (Poland)

Lieutenant-General Sir William George Holmes, KBE, CB, DSO & Bar (20 August 1892 – 16 January 1969) was a senior British Army officer who fought with distinction in the First World War. He later served in the Second World War, where he commanded the 42nd (East Lancashire) Infantry Division during the Battle of France in May/June 1940.

== Early life and First World War ==
The son of a doctor from Aberdeen, Scotland, Holmes was educated at Gresham's School, Holt, and the Royal Military College, Sandhurst. Upon graduating from Sandhurst, Holmes was commissioned as a second lieutenant into the Royal Welsh Fusiliers on 11 October 1911. He served with his regiment, mainly the 1st Battalion, throughout the First World War, during which he was mentioned in despatches four times and received the Distinguished Service Order and bar, and the Italian Silver Medal of Military Valor, commanding his regiment's 1st Battalion on the Italian Front from 1917 to 1918. He received rapid promotion during the war, being promoted to captain in December 1914, temporary major in May 1916, and ending as an acting lieutenant-colonel, to which he was promoted on 10 December 1918, making him, at the age of just 26, one of the youngest of his rank in the British Army.

The citation for his DSO reads:

For conspicuous gallantry and devotion to duty. During the final stages of the fighting he was the soul of both defence and offence. He was placed in command of the remnants of all battalions in the vicinity, and it was mainly due to his gallantry and dash that the enemy counter-attack was defeated.

== Between the wars ==
In 1921 Holmes served in Waziristan and later returned to the United Kingdom and became adjutant of the 6th Battalion, Royal Welch Fusiliers, a Territorial Army formation serving as part of the 158th Brigade of the 53rd (Welsh) Infantry Division, from 12 March 1923. He relinquished the appointment on 12 September upon transferring to the East Lancashire Regiment. He attended the Staff College, Camberley, from 1928 to 1929, alongside fellow students like Gerald Templer, John Harding, Richard McCreery and Alexander Galloway.

In 1933 Holmes became commanding officer of the 2nd Battalion, East Lancashire Regiment. Promoted to colonel the same year, he was given a general staff position in the Northern Command in 1934 and, promoted to the temporary rank of brigadier on 1 October 1935, was given command of the 8th Infantry Brigade, part of the 3rd Infantry Division. On 14 June 1937, at the age of 44, Holmes became the British Army's youngest major-general, and after spending a period on half-pay, on 1 March 1938 received his first divisional command, the 42nd (East Lancashire) Infantry Division, a Territorial Army formation.

== Second World War ==
Holmes commanded the 42nd Division in France in 1940 with the British Expeditionary Force (BEF). The division was sent to France in April 1940 but had little time to get used to its new environment before the Germans launched their assault on Western Europe the following month.

Following the fall of France and the retreat and evacuation from Dunkirk, Holmes was promoted to lieutenant-general (with seniority dated back to 10 July 1938) and given command of the newly formed X Corps, which was stationed in Northern England, trying to ready itself to repel a German invasion. The youngest division commander in the BEF, he was also the first to be promoted to command a corps in the aftermath of Dunkirk.

Holmes and his corps were later sent overseas, serving in Syria and North Africa. In November 1941, after being mentioned in despatches for his services in the Middle East, Holmes became General Officer Commanding British Troops in Egypt, in addition to his responsibilities as commander of X Corps. In August 1942 he became General-Director of Transportation at the War Office. Holmes's last command was the Ninth Army, based in Palestine and Transjordan, a command he held from September 1942 until his retirement in 1945.

== Honours ==
- 1917: Distinguished Service Order
- 1918: Silver Medal of Military Valour (Italy)
- 1938: Companion of the Order of the Bath
- 1944: Order of the Phoenix, Class II (Greece)
- 1944: Knight Commander of the Order of the British Empire
- 1945: Order of Polonia Restituta, Class II (Poland)

== Bibliography ==
- Smart, Nick (2005). Biographical Dictionary of British Generals of the Second World War. Barnsley, South Yorkshire: Pen and Sword Books. ISBN 1844150496.

Military offices
Preceded by Kenneth Buchanan	GOC 42nd (East Lancashire) Infantry Division; 1938–1940	Succeeded by Henry Willcox
New command	GOC X Corps; 1940–1942	Succeeded by Herbert Lumsden
Preceded by Sir James Marshall-Cornwall	GOC British Troops in Egypt; 1941–1942	Succeeded by Robert Stone
Preceded by Sir Henry Maitland Wilson	GOC Ninth Army; 1942–1945	Post disbanded
