= Julian Grenfell, 3rd Baron Grenfell =

British Labour hereditary peer (born 1935)

The Right Honourable The Lord Grenfell
- Coat of arms Blazon Escutcheon: Gules, on a fess between three organ rests or, a mural crown of the first. Crest: On the battlements of a tower gules, a griffin passant or, holding in the beak a sprig of laurel. Supporters: Dexter: An Egyptian cavalryman. Sinister: An Egyptian infantryman. Motto: Loyal devoir (Honest duty) These arms are a difference of the arms of the ancient family of Grenville (alias Granville, Greenfield, etc) of Bideford in Devon and Stowe in Cornwall

Member of the House of Lords
- Lord Temporal
- Hereditary peerage 24 September 1976 – 11 November 1999
- Preceded by: The 2nd Baron Grenfell
- Succeeded by: Seat abolished
- Life peerage 17 April 2000 – 1 October 2014

Personal details
- Born: Julian Pascoe Francis St Leger Grenfell; 23 May 1935 (age 91)
- Party: Labour
- Parent: Pascoe Grenfell, 2nd Baron Grenfell (father)
- Education: King's College, Cambridge

Julian Pascoe Francis St Leger Grenfell, 3rd Baron Grenfell, Baron Grenfell of Kilvey (born 23 May 1935), is a Labour hereditary peer, life peer, and former member of the House of Lords known for his strong Europhile views.

== Background and education ==
Grenfell is the son of Pascoe Grenfell, 2nd Baron Grenfell, by his first wife Elizabeth Sarah Polk Shaughnessy, daughter of Captain the Honourable Alfred Thomas Shaughnessy, second son of Thomas Shaughnessy, 1st Baron Shaughnessy. He was educated at Eton and King's College, Cambridge, where he was President of the Cambridge Union. He was commissioned in the King's Royal Rifle Corps (60th Rifles) in 1954 and became a Captain in the Queen's Royal Rifles (TA) in 1962.

== Career ==
Grenfell was a programme presenter at Associated Television from 1960 to 1963 and worked as a free-lance journalist from 1963 to 1964. He was with the World Bank between 1965 and 1995, serving in Washington D.C., New York City (where he was Special Representative to the United Nations from 1974 to 1981) and Paris.

== Political career ==
Lord Grenfell first entered the House of Lords on his father's death in 1976. He was a member of the UK Delegation to Parliamentary Assemblies of the Council of Europe and Western European Union from 1997 to 1999. He lost his seat in Parliament after the House of Lords Act 1999 removed the automatic right of hereditary peers to sit in that body. However, in 2000 he was created a life peer as Baron Grenfell of Kilvey, of Kilvey in the County of Swansea, which allowed him to return to the House of Lords. He was Principal Deputy Chairman of Committees from 2002 to 2008, a Deputy Speaker from 2002 to 2008, Chairman of the Select Committee on the European Union from 2002 to 2008 and a member of the Procedure Committee from 2003 to 2007. Lord Grenfell took formal voluntary retirement from the House of Lords on 31 March 2014, under a procedure laid down in a Resolution of the House of 27 June 2011. In addition, on 1 October 2014 he became the first peer to retire permanently under the statutory provisions of the House of Lords Reform Act 2014. He retired to Paris.

Lord Grenfell was President of the Anglo-Belgian Society of the UK, 2006–2014.

== Honours and awards ==
Orders

- (France) Chevalier de la Légion d'honneur
- Commander of the Order of Merit of the Federal Republic of Germany
- Commander of the Order of the Crown of Belgium
- (Croatia) Member of the Order of Duke Branimir

Medal

- Medal of Honour of the Senate of France

== Notes ==
Peerage of the United Kingdom
Preceded by Pascoe Grenfell	Baron Grenfell; 1976–present Member of the House of Lords (1976–1999)	Incumbent; Heir presumptive: Richard Grenfell
