= Frederick Forestier-Walker =

British military officer (1844–1910)

General Sir Frederick Forestier-Walker GCMG KCB KStJ
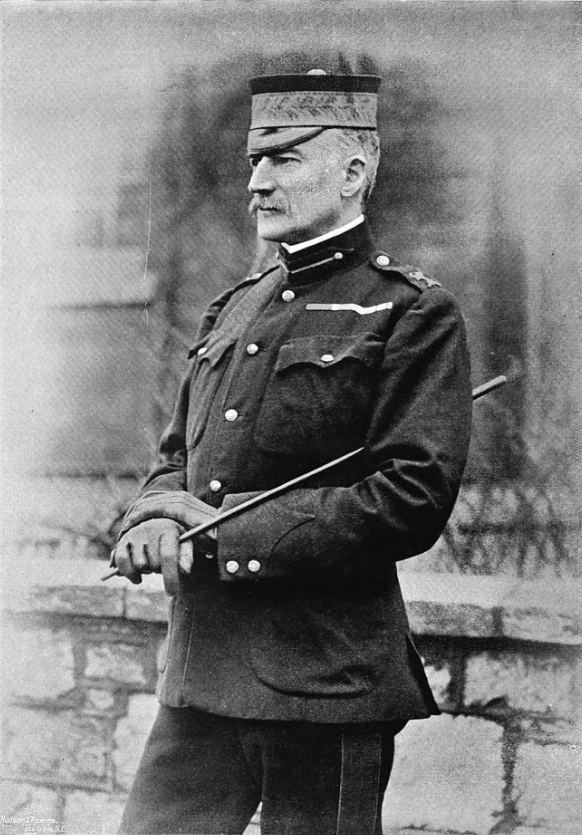
- Forestier-Walker in 1898

Governor of Gibraltar
- In office 1905–1910
- Preceded by: Sir George White
- Succeeded by: Sir Archibald Hunter

Personal details
- Born: 14 April 1844 Bushey, Hertfordshire
- Died: 30 August 1910 (aged 66) Tenby, Pembrokeshire
- Spouse: Mabel Louisa Ross (after 1887)
- Relations: Francis Ogilvy-Grant, 6th Earl of Seafield (grandfather)
- Children: 1
- Parent(s): Sir Edward Forestier-Walker; Lady Jane Ogilvy-Grant
- Education: Royal Military College, Sandhurst

Military service
- Allegiance: United Kingdom
- Branch/service: British Army
- Years of service: 1862–1910
- Rank: General
- Commands: Cape Colony; Western District; British Troops in Egypt
- Battles/wars: Cape Frontier Wars; Anglo-Zulu War; Second Boer War
- Awards: Mentioned in Despatches

General Sir Frederick William Edward Forestier-Walker, GCMG, KCB, KStJ (17 April 1844 – 30 August 1910) was a British senior military officer and Governor of Gibraltar.

== Early life ==
Forestier-Walker was born on 17 April 1844 in Bushey, Hertfordshire. He was the eldest son of General Sir Edward Forestier-Walker (previously Walker), by his first wife, Lady Jane Ogilvy-Grant, daughter of the 6th Earl of Seafield. He was educated at the Royal Military College, Sandhurst.

== Career ==
Forestier-Walker was commissioned into the Scots Guards as ensign and lieutenant, by purchase, on 5 September 1862, and was appointed a lieutenant and captain, by purchase, on 11 July 1865.

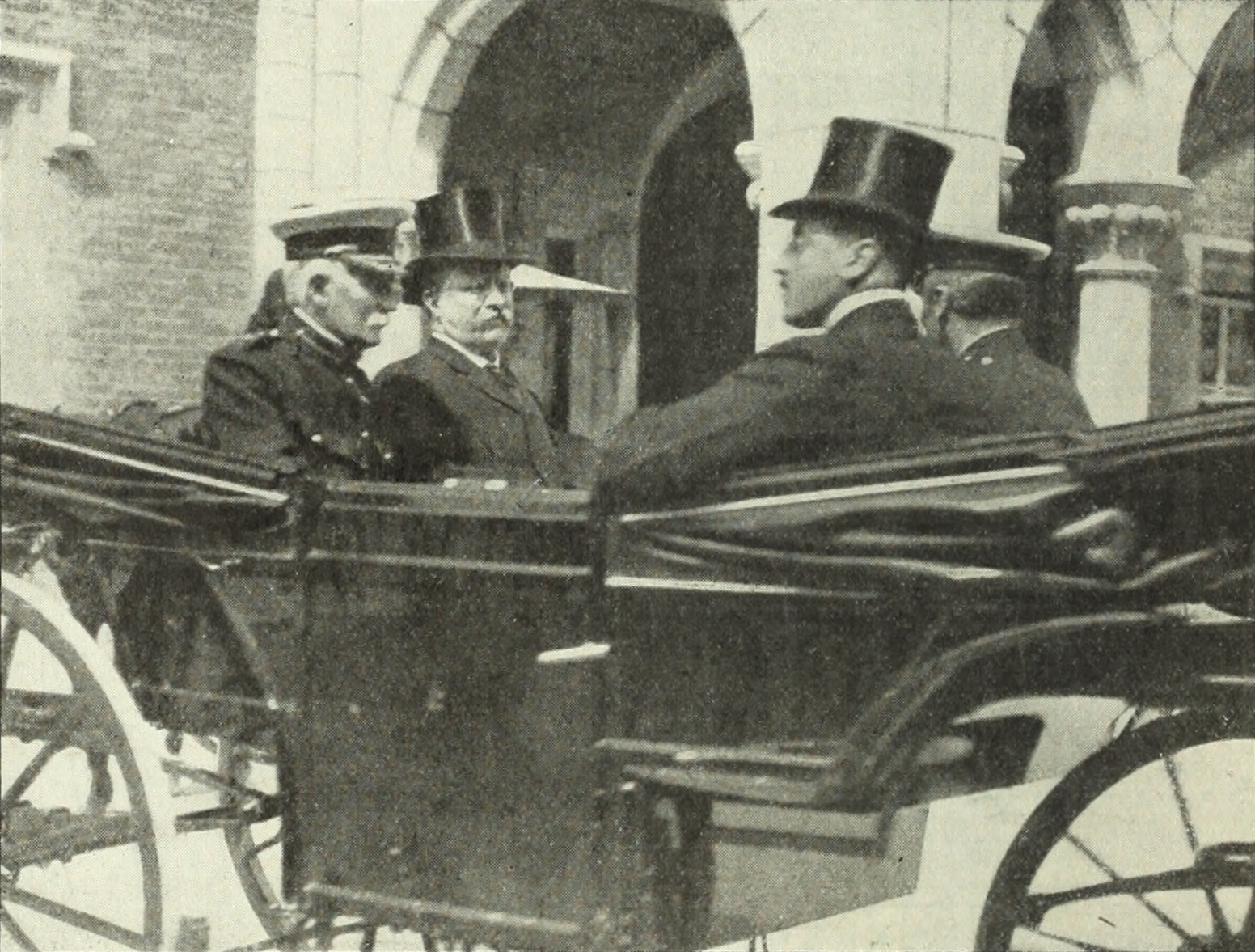
President Theodore Roosevelt at Gibraltar with Forestier-Walker and the American consul, 1909

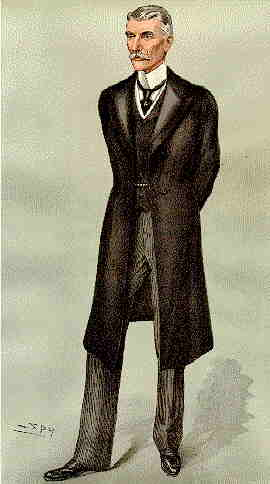
Caricature of General Sir Frederick Forestier-Walker, Vanity Fair, December 1902

In 1873 he was appointed Military Secretary to the General Officer Commanding Cape Colony and 15 October 1878 was promoted colonel. Forestier-Walker saw action in the Cape Frontier Wars, for which he was appointed a Companion of the Order of the Bath in November 1878, and in the Anglo-Zulu War. He was promoted to captain and lieutenant colonel of the Scots Guards 20 March 1880. In 1882 he was appointed Assistant Adjutant and Quartermaster-General for the Home District but shortly after returned to South Africa. From 1884 he served in Bechuanaland, and in January 1886, for services in that protectorate, he was appointed a Companion of the Order of St Michael and St George.

He was appointed a brigadier at Aldershot in 1889 and Commander of British Troops in Egypt in 1890, during which he was knighted and promoted to a Knight Commander of the Order of the Bath. Upon returning from Egypt in 1895, he was appointed General Officer Commanding Western District, serving until 1890.

In 1899, he again returned to Africa, becoming GOC Cape Colony and acting as lieutenant general in command of Lines of Communication, South Africa Field Force, 1899–1901. He was thus responsible for disembarkation of troops and military stores and sending them to the front. In a despatch dated 31 March 1900, the Commander-in-Chief in South Africa, Lord Roberts, wrote how Forestier-Walker carried out his duties "with credit to himself and with advantage to the public service". He was promoted to Knight Grand Cross of the Order of St Michael and St George (GCMG) in November 1900 for his services in South Africa, and was a Knight of Grace of the Order of St John from 1901. Following the end of the war, Forestier-Walker was promoted to the rank of general on 6 July 1902.

=== Later life ===
He was Governor of Gibraltar from 1905 until shortly before his death in 1910, and also acted as General Officer Commanding Mediterranean in 1909.

In retirement, he became a Director of the Cold Storage Company.

== Personal life ==
In 1887 he married Mabel Louisa Ross, a daughter of Lt. Col. A. Ernest Ross. Together, they had one son:

- Ian Frederick Walter Forestier-Walker (1888–1920), a Lieutenant in the Scots Guards.

Sir Frederick died on 30 August 1910 at Tenby, Pembrokeshire.

== Sources ==
- Vibart, Henry Meredith (1912). "Forestier-Walker, Frederick William Edward Forestier" . In Lee, Sidney (ed.). Dictionary of National Biography (2nd supplement). London: Smith, Elder & Co. pp. 40–41.

Military offices
Preceded by Sir James Dormer	GOC British Troops in Egypt; 1890–1895	Succeeded by Sir Charles Knowles
Preceded by Sir Richard Harrison	GOC Western District; 1895–1899	Succeeded by Sir William Butler
Preceded by The Duke of Connaught	GOC-in-C Mediterranean (temporary); 1909–1910	Succeeded by Sir Ian Hamilton
Honorary titles
Preceded by Somerset M. Wiseman Clarke	Colonel of the King's Own Scottish Borderers; 1905–1910	Succeeded by Charles Louis Woollcombe
Government offices
Preceded by Sir George Stuart White	Governor of Gibraltar; 1905–1910	Succeeded by Sir Archibald Hunter
