= Francis Octavius Grenfell =

English recipient of the Victoria Cross

- Captain Francis Grenfell VC
- Born: 4 September 1880; Surrey, England
- Died: 24 May 1915 (aged 34); Hooge, Belgium
- Burial place: Vlamertinghe Military Cemetery
- Relatives: Field Marshal Francis Grenfell, 1st Baron Grenfell (uncle); Julian Grenfell (cousin); Admiral John Pascoe Grenfell (grandfather)
- Military career
- Allegiance: United Kingdom
- Branch: British Army
- Service years: 1900–1915
- Rank: Captain
- Units: King's Royal Rifle Corps; 9th Lancers
- Conflicts: Second Boer War World War I: Western Front; Race to the Sea; Battle of Elouges; Second Battle of Ypres †
- Awards: Victoria Cross

Francis Octavius Grenfell, VC (4 September 1880 – 24 May 1915) was an English recipient of the Victoria Cross.

== Early life and family ==
He was born on 4 September 1880 to Sophia and Pascoe Du Pré Grenfell. He was one of fifteen children. He had a twin brother, Riversdale Grenfell, also in the 9th Lancers, who was killed in action in September 1914. Their maternal grandfather was Admiral John Pascoe Grenfell and other relatives included their uncle, Field Marshal Francis Grenfell, 1st Baron Grenfell. An older brother, Lieutenant Robert Septimus Grenfell, 21st (Empress of India's) Lancers, was killed in a cavalry charge during the Battle of Omdurman in 1898. Three other brothers, Cecil Grenfell, Howard Maxwell Grenfell and Arthur Morton Grenfell all reached the rank of lieutenant colonel in the British Army. A cousin, Lieutenant Claude George Grenfell (Thorneycroft's Mounted Infantry) was killed at Spion Kop during the Boer War and two other cousins Julian Grenfell, the poet, and his brother, Gerald William Grenfell, were killed in the First World War.

An Etonian who represented his school at cricket, Grenfell joined the army in 1900 and first served in the Second Boer War in the King's Royal Rifle Corps.

== Victoria Cross ==
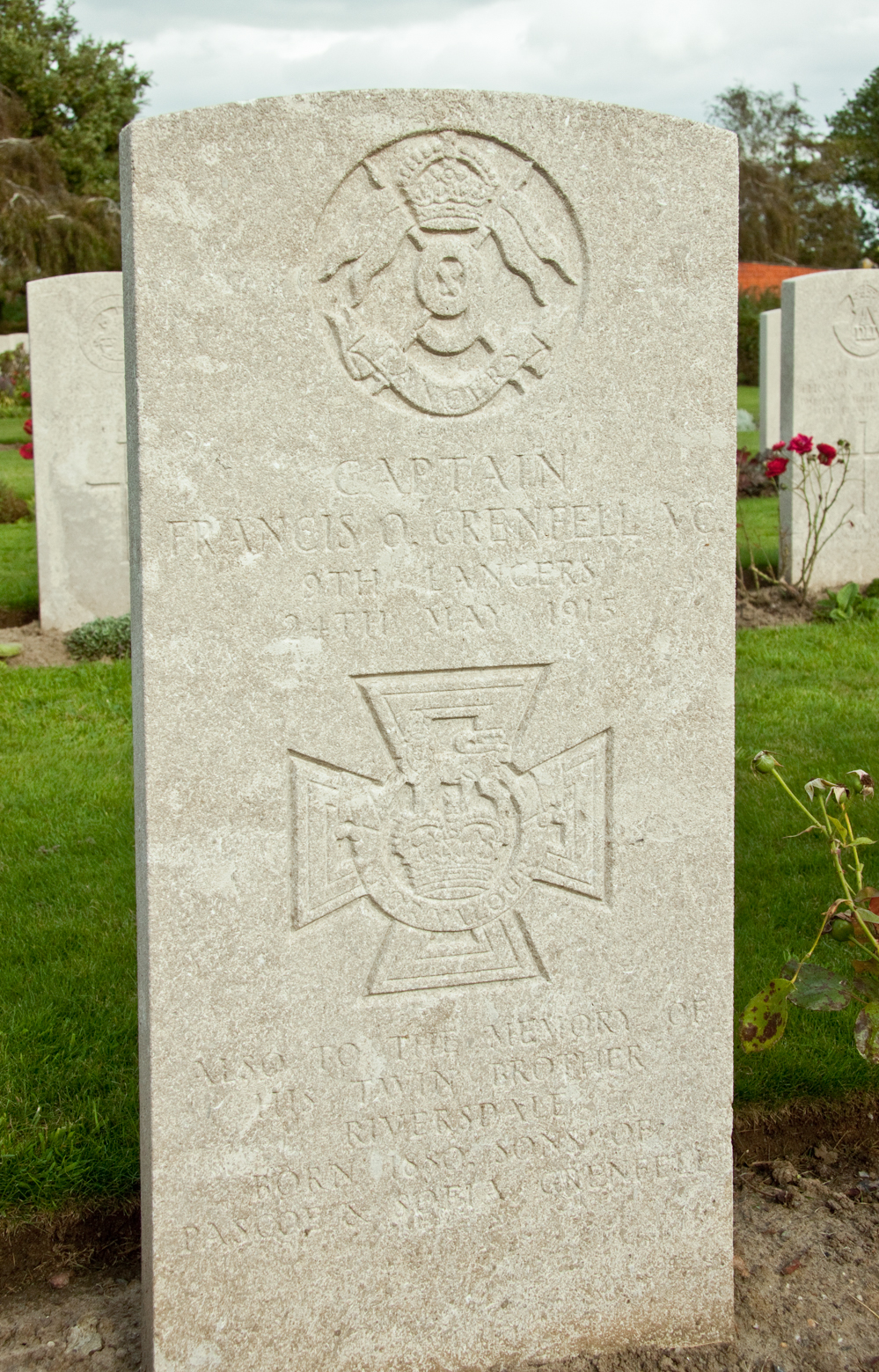
Grenfell's gravestone in Vlamertinghe Military Cemetery

Grenfell was 33 years old, and a captain in the 9th (Queen's Royal) Lancers, British Army during the First World War when the following deed during the action of Elouges took place for which he was awarded the VC.

On 24 August 1914 at Audregnies, Belgium, Captain Grenfell rode with the regiment in a charge against a large body of unbroken German infantry. The casualties were very heavy and the captain was left as the senior officer. He was rallying part of the regiment behind a railway embankment when he was twice hit and severely wounded. In spite of his injuries, however, when asked for help in saving the guns, by Major Ernest Wright Alexander of the 119th Battery, Royal Field Artillery, he and some volunteers, under a hail of bullets, helped to manhandle and push the guns out of range of enemy fire. The citation was gazetted on 16 September 1914 and read:

For gallantry in action against unbroken infantry at Andregnies, Belgium, on 24th August 1914, and for gallant conduct in assisting to save the guns of the 119th Battery, Royal Field Artillery, near Doubon the same day.

He was killed in action on 24 May 1915 and is buried in the Vlamertinghe Military Cemetery.

== Legacy ==
His Victoria Cross is displayed at the Regimental Museum of the 9th/12th Royal Lancers housed in Derby Museum and Art Gallery, Derby, England.

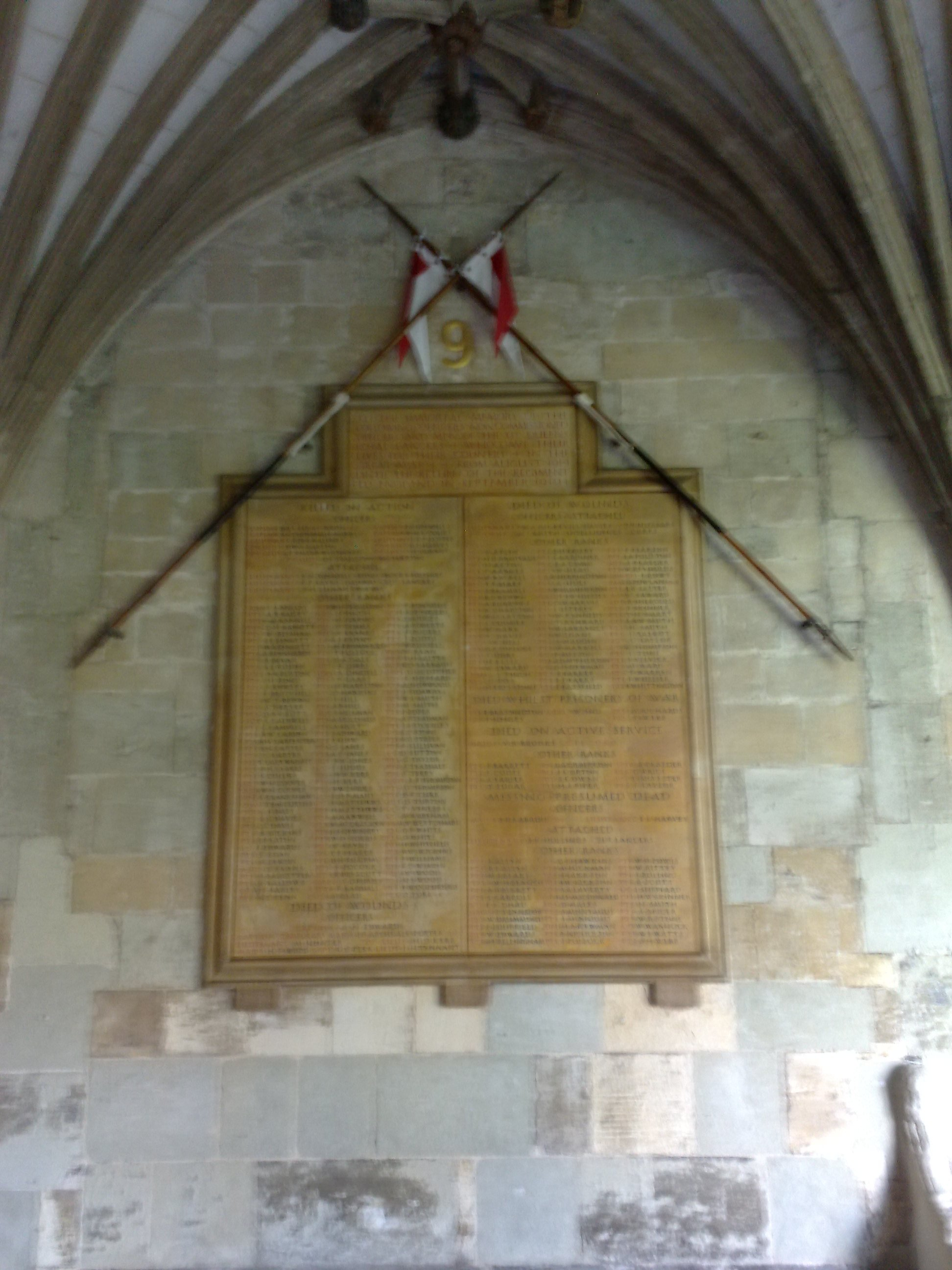
Memorial board in the cloisters of Canterbury Cathedral to the officers and men of the 9th (Queen's Royal) Lancers who died during the First World War.

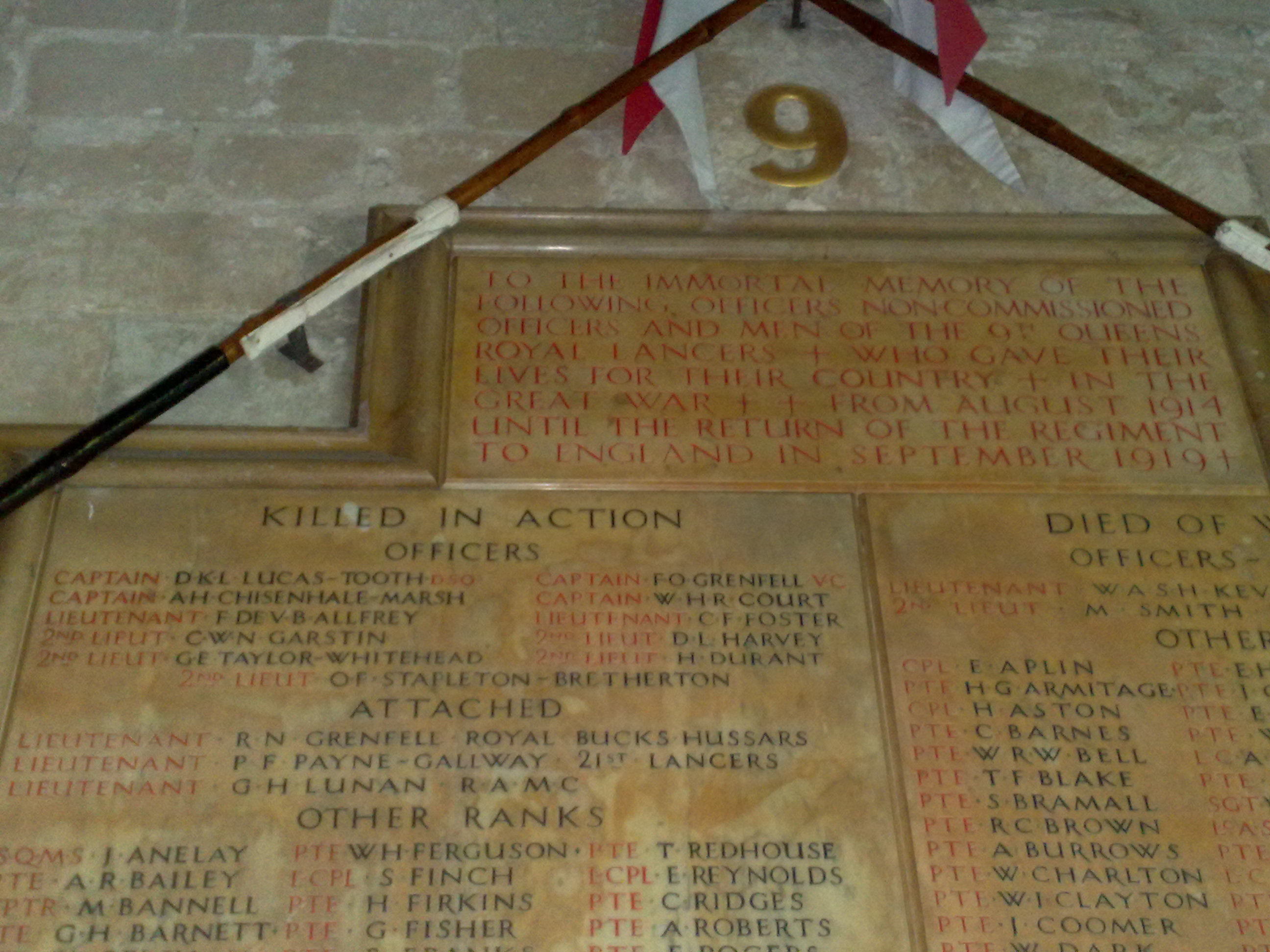
Detail of the memorial showing the names of the Grenfell twins.

== Polo ==
All nine of the Grenfell brothers were accomplished polo players. Francis and his twin brother, Riversdale Grenfell, were regarded as the best in the family. Francis was rated at an 8-goal handicap. The twin brothers were on the Ranelagh team that won the American Open and on the team Freebooters, alongside Leopold Christian Duncan Jenner and the Duke of Roxburghe, that won the Hurlingham Champion Cup.
