= Ernest Alexander =

Recipient of the Victoria Cross

Major-General Ernest Alexander VC CB CMG DL
- Born: Ernest Wright Alexander; 2 October 1870; Liverpool, England
- Died: 25 August 1934 (aged 63); Kingsbridge, Devon, England
- Burial place: Putney Vale Cemetery, London; 51.440624°N 0.239389°W
- Military career
- Branch: British Army
- Service years: 1889–1934
- Rank: Major-General
- Units: Royal Artillery
- Conflicts: First World War; Western Front; Action of Elouges; Battle of the Somme
- Awards: Mentioned in Despatches; Knight of the Order of Savoy (Italy); Grand Officer of the Order of Aviz (Portugal); Croix de Guerre (France)

Major-General Ernest Wright Alexander (2 October 1870 – 25 August 1934) was a British Army officer and an English recipient of the Victoria Cross, the highest award for gallantry in the face of the enemy that can be awarded to British and Commonwealth forces.

== Military career ==
=== Early career ===
Ernest Wright Alexander was born at 87 Everton Road, Liverpool on 2 October 1870, the son of one of the directors of the Suez Canal. Alexander was educated at Harrow School before going to the Royal Military Academy, Woolwich. He was commissioned into the Royal Field Artillery as a second lieutenant on 27 July 1889.

In 1892 he travelled to serve in India, where he was promoted to lieutenant on 27 July, and to captain on 26 December 1899. Alexander returned to England in 1900 before completing a second tour of India between 1903 and 1906, leaving upon his promotion to major on 25 April. The military historian J. M. Bourne describes Alexander's career to this point as "unspectacular".

=== Action at Elouges ===
Britain declared war on Germany on 4 August 1914, and Alexander began his service in the First World War. Stationed in Belgium, he took part in the Great Retreat later the same month. Commanding the 119th Battery, Royal Field Artillery, Alexander was awarded the Victoria Cross (VC) for gallantry on 24 August, during the action of Elouges. When the flank guard was attacked by a German corps, Alexander handled his battery against overwhelming odds with such conspicuous success that all his guns were saved notwithstanding that they had to be withdrawn by hand by himself and volunteers led by a Captain (Francis Octavius Grenfell) of the 9th Lancers. This enabled the retirement of the 5th Division to be carried out without serious loss. Subsequently, Major Alexander rescued a wounded man under heavy fire. The full citation for his VC reads as follows:

For conspicuous bravery and great ability at Elouges on 24th August, 1914, when the flank guard was attacked by a German corps, in handling his battery against overwhelming odds with such conspicuous success that all his guns were saved, notwithstanding that they had to be withdrawn by hand by himself and three other men. This enabled the retirement of the 5th Division to be carried out without serious loss. Subsequently Lieutenant-Colonel Alexander (then Major) rescued a wounded man under a heavy fire, with the greatest gallantry and devotion to duty.

=== Later service ===
Grenfell also received the VC, and two of Alexander's sergeants were awarded the Distinguished Conduct Medal. Alexander's VC was the third to be won during the First World War, two having been achieved on the day before his. He was subsequently promoted to lieutenant-colonel in October and was appointed Companion of the Order of St Michael and St George (CMG) in June 1915.Alexander's bravery saw him gain quick promotion during the war, being promoted to the temporary rank of brigadier-general within a year of fighting at Elouges.

Towards the start of 1916 he was appointed Brigadier-General Royal Artillery to XV Corps, a unit which played a large role in the First day on the Somme. Alexander laid down effective artillery barrages as XV Corps advanced, playing a large part in the success of its attacks at Fricourt and Mametz. The military historian, Brigadier-General Sir James Edmonds, was so impressed by Alexander's techniques that he reproduced full plans of his barrages in the History of the Great War. Alexander continued to develop his creeping barrages which proved pivotal in XV Corps' victory at the Battle of Bazentin Ridge on 14 July.

After being made a brevet colonel in January 1917, Alexander was subsequently given command of the Royal Artillery serving in XI Corps, commanded by Lieutenant-General Sir Richard Haking, in May, taking over from Brigadier General G. G. S. Carey. He continued with XI Corps until April 1918 when he was promoted to major-general and given command of First Army's Royal Artillery. This promotion came about because First Army was commanded by General Sir Henry Horne, who had been promoted off the back of his successes while in command of XV Corps in 1916, and perceived he owed a debt to Alexander for this.

Alexander continued to receive awards as the war came to an end, being created a Cavalier of the Military Order of Savoy in September 1918, and a Companion of the Order of the Bath in January 1919. In August he then received the French Croix de Guerre and was created a Grand Officer of the Military Order of Avis by Portugal. He went on to command the Royal Artillery within the Southern Area of Aldershot Command.

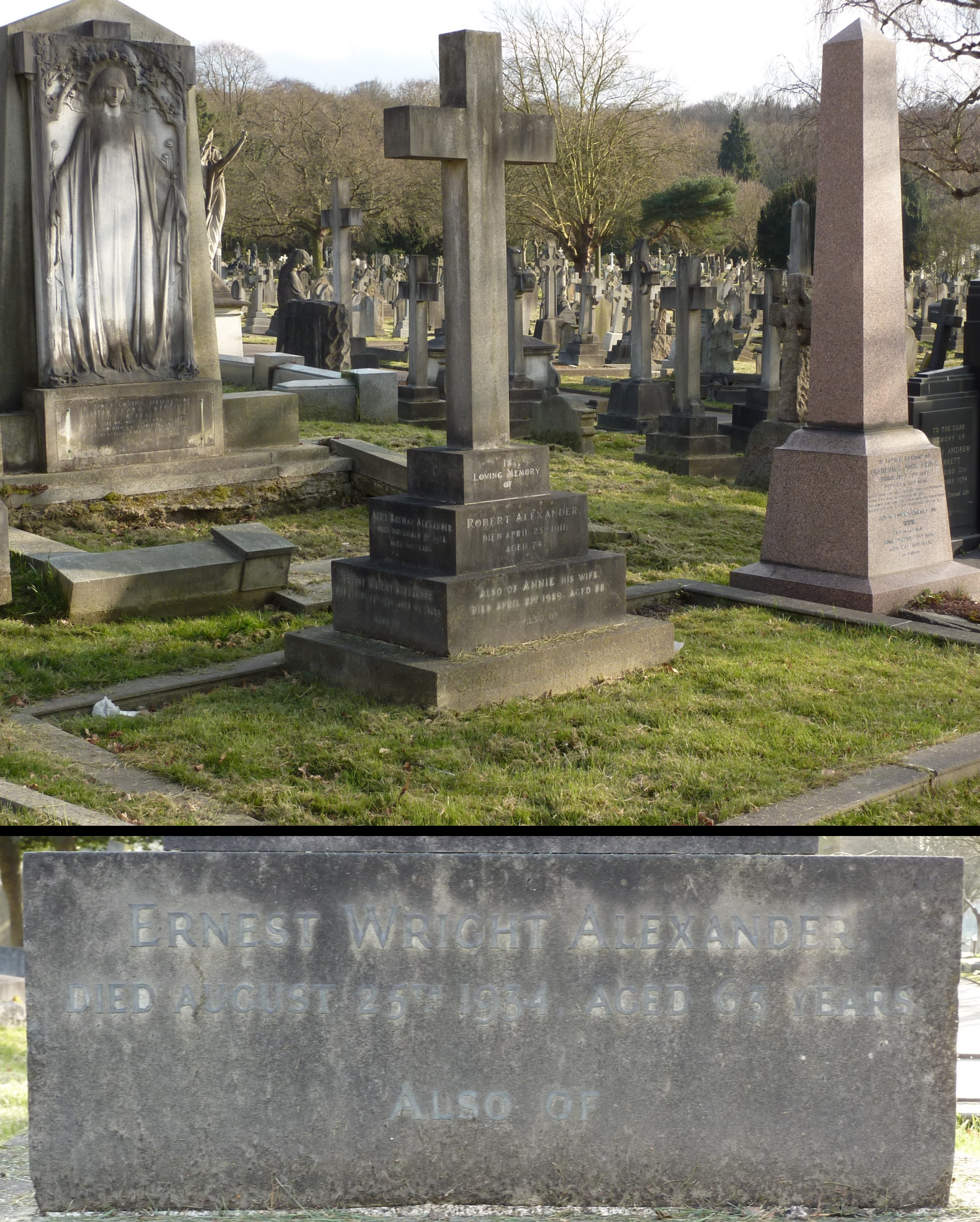
The grave of Major-General Ernest Alexander VC at Putney Vale Cemetery, London.

He retired from the army in October 1920 and, having reverted to his substantive rank of colonel the year before, in March 1919, was granted the honorary rank of major-general.

=== Retirement ===
In retirement Alexander became a deputy lieutenant of Devon on 17 June 1931.

He died in his 64th year on 25 August 1934 in Kingsbridge, Devon, and was buried at Putney Vale Cemetery. His medal group is on display at the Ashcroft Gallery in the Imperial War Museum, London.
