= Ninth Army (United Kingdom) =

- 9th Army formation badge.
- Active: 1941–1945
- Country: United Kingdom
- Branch: British Army
- Type: Field army
- Part of: Middle East Command
- Engagements: Second World War

The Ninth Army was a field army formation of the British Army during the Second World War, formed on 1 November 1941 by the renaming of Headquarters, British Troops Palestine and Transjordan. The Ninth Army controlled British and Commonwealth land forces stationed in the eastern Mediterranean.

== Commanders ==
- General Sir Henry Maitland Wilson (October 1941 – September 1942)
- Lieutenant-General Sir William George Holmes (September 1942 – February 1945)
