= Benjamin C. Stephenson =

Sir Benjamin Charles Stephenson, GCH (1766 – 10 June 1839) was a British courtier and government official in the late 18th and early 19th centuries. After military service, he served kings George III, George IV, and William IV. He was, from 1813 to 1832, Surveyor-General (head of the Office of Works).

== Career ==
Stephenson joined the army, serving in the 9th Regiment of Light Dragoons and the 3rd Dragoon Guards. He saw action at the Battle of Famars and the Siege of Valenciennes in 1793, and in later skirmishes was seriously wounded.

In 1803, he was appointed Deputy Judge Advocate of the South West District, and later served on a commission on military expenditure. In 1812 he was appointed Master of the King's Household at Windsor, and in 1823 was appointed to superintend the finances of Prince Frederick, Duke of York and Albany.

Stephenson succeeded Sir James Wyatt as Surveyor-General of the Board of Works in 1813. As Surveyor-General, in 1829, he commissioned Sir John Soane to design the New State Paper Office in Duke Street, east of London's St James's Park, as a purpose-built repository for national records in England (superseded in 1856 by Sir James Pennethorne's Public Record Office in Chancery Lane, and demolished in 1862). When the Board merged with the Department of Woods and Forests in 1832, Stephenson was appointed a Commissioner in that department.

Promoted a Knight Commander of the Guelphic Order of Hanover in 1830 and Knight Grand Cross in 1834, he died at his London home in Bolton Row, Piccadilly on 10 June 1839 and was buried in the family vault in Kensington churchyard on 15 June.

== Family ==
He married Marie Rivers in 1805, and they had six daughters and two sons: William Henry (18 November 1811-1 March 1898) who became chairman of the Board of the Inland Revenue (1862-1877) and was private secretary to British Prime Minister Sir Robert Peel (1841-1846), and Frederick Charles Arthur (1821-1911) who became a prominent British Army officer. William Henry's son, also named Benjamin Charles Stephenson was a prominent English dramatist, lyricist and librettist.
