= Pascoe Grenfell, 2nd Baron Grenfell =

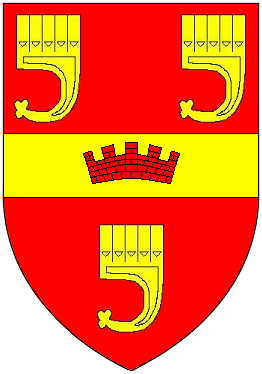
Arms of Grenfell: Gules, on a fess between three clarions or a mural crown of the first. These arms are a difference of the arms of the ancient family of Grenville (alias Granville, Greenfield, etc.) of Bideford in Devon and Stowe in Cornwall

Colonel Pascoe Christian Victor Francis Grenfell, 2nd Baron Grenfell CBE TD (12 December 1905 – 24 September 1976) was a peer in the House of Lords.

== Background ==
Grenfell was the son of Margaret Majendie and Field Marshal Francis Wallace Grenfell 1st Baron Grenfell, who had fought in the Ninth Xhosa War, the Anglo-Zulu War, and the Anglo-Egyptian War.

== Life ==
Educated at Eton, he succeeded to the barony at his father's death in 1925. Until 1936 he served in the King's Royal Rifle Corps. Having fought in World War II, he was mentioned in despatches and decorated with the American Legion of Merit; he was given the Territorial Decoration in 1951.

He became a Deputy Speaker in the House of Lords and was appointed to the Order of the British Empire as a Commander in 1974.

Peerage of the United Kingdom
Preceded by Francis Grenfell	Baron Grenfell; 1925–1976	Succeeded by Julian Grenfell
