= British Troops in Egypt =

Command of the British Army (1882–1956)

- Active: 1882–1956
- Country: United Kingdom
- Branch: British Army
- Type: Command
- Garrison/HQ: Cairo

British Troops in Egypt was a command of the British Army.

== History ==
A British Army commander was appointed in the late 19th century after the Anglo-Egyptian War in 1882. The British Army remained in Egypt throughout the First World War and, after the War, remained there to protect the Suez Canal. Following Egypt's independence in 1922, the United Kingdom and Egypt entered into a treaty in 1936 whereby British troops remained to protect the canal and to train the Egyptian Army.

HQ BTE occupied a garrison role while the Western Desert Campaign was fought against Italy and Germany during the Second World War. Initially British troops in the area consisted of the Mobile Division (Egypt), later to become the 7th Armoured Division, and the Cairo Brigade. On 5 July 1942, 'A' Force Depot was redesignated as 74th Armoured Brigade (Dummy Tanks) in Egypt under the command of Headquarters British Troops in Egypt. The "brigade" was redesignated a number of times: as 24th Armoured Brigade (Dummy Tanks) from 23 August 1943, as 87th Armoured Brigade (Dummy Tanks) from 26 May 1944, and back to 24th Armoured Brigade (Dummy Tanks) again from 14 July 1944. Finally, on 29 September 1944 it was redesignated and reorganized as 13th Reserve Unit in the UK.

After the Second World War anti-British resentment escalated and there was rioting in Egyptian streets in February 1946. British troops left Egypt in June 1956 shortly before the Suez Crisis.

It is reported that in December 1945 Major General Lashmer Whistler, GOC 3rd Division, became GOC British Troops in Egypt and shortly after ceased to be a member of the 3rd Division. Whistler's rank of major general was made substantive in February 1947, with seniority backdated to April 1946.

The Egyptian Free Officers Movement overthrew King Farouk in the Egyptian coup d'état of 1952. The Free Officers then concluded the Anglo–Egyptian Agreement of 1954, made during the month of October, with Great Britain. It stipulated a phased evacuation of British troops from the Suez base, agreed to withdrawal of all troops within 20 months (that is, June 1956); maintenance of the base was to be continued; and allowed Britain to hold the right to return for seven years. The British troops were withdrawn by 24 March 1956. The last unit was 2nd Battalion, Grenadier Guards, leaving Port Said.

== Commanders ==
Commanders of the British Army of Occupation in Cairo included:

- May 1883–January 1888 General Sir Frederick Stephenson
- January 1888–December 1890 Major-General Sir James Dormer
- December 1890–October 1895 Major-General Sir Frederick Forestier-Walker
- October 1895–July 1897 Major-General Charles B. Knowles
- July 1897–January 1899 General Sir Francis Grenfell

Later commanders included:

- 1899–1903 Major-General Sir Reginald Talbot
- 1903–1905 Major-General John Slade, commanded British troops in Egypt
- 1905–1908 Major-General George Bullock
- 1908–1912 Major-General Sir John Maxwell
- 1912–1914 Major-General Julian Byng
- 1914–1915 Lieutenant-General Sir John Maxwell
- 1915–1916 General Sir Charles Monro
- 1916–1917 Lieutenant-General Sir Archibald Murray
- 1917–1919 Field-Marshal Viscount Allenby
- 1919–1923 Lieutenant-General Sir Walter Congreve
- 1923–1927 General Sir Richard Haking
- 1927–1931 General Sir Peter Strickland
- 1931–1934 General Sir John Burnett-Stuart
- 1934–1938 General Sir George Weir
- 1938–1939 Lieutenant-General Sir Robert Gordon-Finlayson
- 1939–1941 Lieutenant-General Sir Henry Maitland Wilson
- 1941–1941 Lieutenant-General Sir Richard O'Connor
- 1941–1941 Lieutenant-General Sir James Marshall-Cornwall
- 1941–1942 Lieutenant-General William Holmes
- 1942–1944 Lieutenant-General Robert Stone
- 1944–1948 Lieutenant-General Sir Charles Allfrey
- 1948–1949 Lieutenant-General Richard Gale
- 1949–1952 Lieutenant-General Sir George Erskine
- 1952–1954 Lieutenant-General Sir Francis Festing
- 1954–1956 Lieutenant-General Sir Richard Hull

== See also ==
- Green Island (Egypt) - fortification possibly built by HQ BTE
- Maadi Camp

== Bibliography ==
- Butler, L. J. (2002). Britain and Empire : adjusting to a post-imperial world. I.B. Taurus. OCLC 1200286507.
- Joslen, Lt-Col H.F. (1990) [1st. Pub. HMSO:1960]. Orders of Battle, Second World War, 1939–1945. London: London Stamp Exchange. ISBN 0-948130-03-2.
- Mason, Michael. "Killing Time: The British Army and its Antagonists in Egypt, 1945–1954." War & Society 12, no. 2 (1994): 103-126.
- Steven Morewood, The British Defence of Egypt, 1935-1940: Conflict and Crisis in the Eastern Mediterranean Frank Cass, 2005 - History - 274 pages. Notes that the British Cabinet created a Middle East Reserve on 22 February 1939 (p. 125), to consist of one colonial division and to come under the command of GOC.-in-C. BTE.
- Stevens, Major-General W. G. Problems of 2 NZEF, Historical Publications Branch, 1958, Wellington, Official History of New Zealand in the Second World War 1939–45. Contains details on the 2nd New Zealand Expeditionary Force rear base area at Maadi Camp, one of the enormous number of rear base areas HQ BTE supervised during the Second World War.
