= Baron Grenfell =

Barony in the Peerage of the United Kingdom

- Creation date: 15 July 1902
- Created by: King Edward VII
- Peerage: Peerage of the United Kingdom
- First holder: Francis Grenfell
- Present holder: Julian Grenfell, 3rd Baron Grenfell
- Heir presumptive: Richard Arthur St Leger Grenfell
- Remainder to: 1st Baron's heirs male of the body lawfully begotten
- Status: Extant

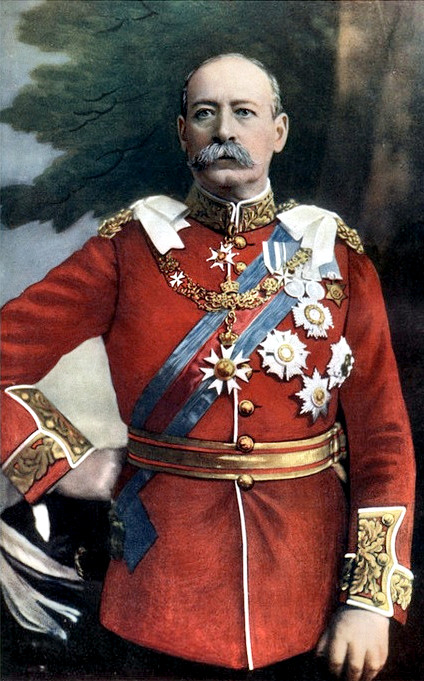
Francis Grenfell, 1st Baron Grenfell.

Baron Grenfell, of Kilvey in the County of Glamorgan, is a title in the Peerage of the United Kingdom. It was created on 15 July 1902 for the military commander Sir Francis Grenfell. His eldest son, the second Baron, was Deputy Speaker of the House of Lords and Chairman of Committees from 1963 to 1976. As of 2010 the title is held by the latter's son, the third Baron, who succeeded in 1976. He previously worked for the World Bank. Lord Grenfell lost his seat in the House of Lords after the passing of the House of Lords Act 1999. However, in 2000 he was made a life peer as Baron Grenfell of Kilvey, of Kilvey in the County of Swansea, and was able to return to the House of Lords.

== Baron Grenfell (1902) ==
- Francis Wallace Grenfell, 1st Baron Grenfell (1841–1925)
- Pascoe Christian Victor Francis Grenfell, 2nd Baron Grenfell (1905–1976)
- Julian Pascoe Francis St Leger Grenfell, 3rd Baron Grenfell (b. 1935)

The heir presumptive to the barony is the present holder's first cousin once removed, Richard Arthur St Leger Grenfell (born 1966). He is the son of John St. Leger Grenfell (1940–1995), himself the second son of Major the Honourable Arthur Bernard John Grenfell (1908–1942), second son of the first Baron.
The heir presumptive's heir apparent is his son, James St. Leger Grenfell (born 1996).

=== Male-line family tree ===
Male-line family tree, Barons Grenfell

Francis Grenfell; 1st Baron Grenfell; 1841–1925
Pascoe Grenfell; 2nd Baron Grenfell; 1905–1976	Maj. Hon. Arthur Grenfell; 1908–1942
Julian Grenfell; 3rd Baron Grenfell born 1935	Francis Grenfell; 1938–2011	John Grenfell; 1940–1995
Richard Grenfell born 1966
James Grenfell born 1996

== Arms ==
Coat of arms of the Barons Grenfell
Crest On the battlements of a tower gules, a griffin passant or, holding in the beak a sprig of laurel. Escutcheon Gules, on a fess between three organ rests or, a mural crown of the first. Supporters Dexter: An Egyptian cavalryman. Sinister: An Egyptian infantryman. Motto Loyal devoir (Honest duty).

== Sources ==
- Kidd, Charles, ed. (1903). Debrett's peerage, baronetage, knightage, and companionage. London: Dean and son. p. 424.
- Leigh Rayment's Peerage Pages
