= River Column =

The River Column was a unit of British soldiers during the Mahdist War.

== Background ==
On 29 June 1881, a Muslim cleric named Muhammad Ahmad proclaimed himself the Mahdi, the promised redeemer of the Islamic world. He and his followers, clad in turbans, skull-caps, white, colorfully patched jibbehs and equipped with swords, spears and shields, defeated several Egyptian garrisons. Since 1882 Egypt had its army officered partly by British officers. One of these men, Colonel William Hicks, led an army of 10,000 along the Nile and then into the desert. There, the square of white-uniformed Egyptians were wiped out by the Mahdi's men (called Dervishes by Europeans), using guns they had captured from the Egyptians.

=== Gordon is sent to Khartoum ===
British Major-General Charles George Gordon, was sent to Egypt to evacuate the city of Khartoum. It was the base of government for Sudan and was threatened by the Mahdists.

When Gordon and his adjutant, Colonel John Donald Hamill Stewart, reached Khartoum, they realized that the place was quite defensible. Instead of evacuating immediately Gordon elected to remain in Khartoum until "every one who wants to go down [the Nile] is given the chance to do so." He soon became besieged by the Mahdi's forces.

In Britain, although the Government, led by Prime Minister William Ewart Gladstone, did not want to send troops, the public clamored for it. Finally, General Lord Garnet Wolseley was sent to Sudan with an ample number of British troops.

== The Gordon Relief Expedition ==
=== The Columns ===
General Wolseley decided, as he was not able to move all of his troops along the Nile and get to Khartoum quickly, that he would send a quick Camel Corps to reinforce Khartoum. It would travel along the shorter route through the desert. The second column, the larger River Column, would relieve the city once the men reached it. The troops were all wearing white sun helmets and some of the River Column wore red tunics. Others of the Relief Expedition wore grey and later khaki.

The Desert and River Columns arrived in and set out from Korti in late 1884. The River Column moved out slowly, commanded by Major General William Earle and Brigadier General Henry Brackenbury. They were hampered by the cataracts of the Nile as they marched south. This column was a force of regular infantry, men of the Egyptian Camel Corps, a Highlander regiment, an artillery battery and a small unit of the Eighth Hussars.

Along the way, a messenger from Khartoum reached them and told Earle and Brackenbury that Gordon wished them to come quickly. Even further down the river to Khartoum, they received word that the Mahdists were reported near Hamdab. With a force of natives under a Mudir, the River Column marched forward. After finding out that Gordon's aide, Colonel Stewart, had left Khartoum on a mission and had been killed by a force of Arabs when his steamboat ran aground, the River Column asked the locals to apprehend the killers or give information about them.

After camping and re-organizing at Hamdab, the River Column moved for Kirbekan, where the Dervishes were now reported to be. Once the column made a reconnaissance of Kirbekan village, the British advanced. One group made a diversion, and General Earle himself accompanied this force of Highlanders. The troops attacked, with bagpipes playing, and moved over the 'koppies' to attack the town. As the group led by Earle formed and charged a little hut full of Dervishes, a sergeant said that a man had fallen and that there were quite a few Arabs in the hut.

Earle ordered the roof to be set afire, but the resistance inside was heavy. Someone saw the General fall, and it was revealed that Earle had been killed. Despite his loss, the Dervishes gradually gave way, despite a good amount of fighting, and the British took the village. General Brackenbury had by now taken command and Colonel Eyre, one of the senior officers, had been killed, so the Stafford Regiment and some of the Black Watch Highlanders rallied under Brackenbury and another officer was ordered to bring a group up a hill to drive away the rest of the Dervishes. Brackenbury noted that a lone Egyptian soldier had charged at the force's flank guard.

However, after the victory, Brackenbury was informed that Khartoum had fallen and Gordon had been killed by the Dervishes. Slowly, the troops marched back up the Nile, with the steamboats helping, and returned to Korti.
