= Henry Maitland Wilson =

British field marshal (1881–1964)

Field Marshal The Right Honourable The Lord Wilson GCB GBE DSO
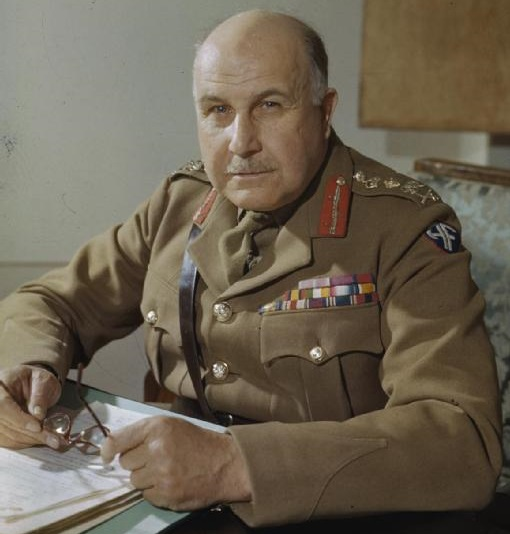
- Wilson in 1944
- Born: 5 September 1881; London, England (Note: One source claims that he was born at Stowlangtoft Hall, Suffolk.)
- Died: 31 December 1964 (aged 83); Chilton, Buckinghamshire, England
- Burial place: St. George's, Stowlangtoft, Suffolk, England
- Military career
- Allegiance: United Kingdom
- Branch: British Army
- Service years: 1900–1947
- Rank: Field Marshal
- Nickname: "Jumbo"
- Service number: 17547
- Unit: Rifle Brigade (The Prince Consort's Own)
- Commands: British Joint Staff Mission to Washington (1944–1947); Supreme Allied Commander Mediterranean Theatre (1944); Middle East Command (1943–1944); Persia and Iraq Command (1942–1943); Ninth Army (1941–1942); British Forces in Palestine and Trans-Jordan (1941); Cyrenaica (1941); British Troops in Egypt (1939–1941); 2nd Infantry Division (1937–1939); 6th Infantry Brigade (1934–1935); 1st Battalion, Rifle Brigade (The Prince Consort's Own) (1927–1930)
- Conflicts: Second Boer War; First World War; Battle of the Somme; Battle of Passchendaele; North-West Frontier; Second World War; Operation Compass; Syria-Lebanon campaign; Dodecanese campaign
- Awards: Knight Grand Cross of the Order of the Bath; Knight Grand Cross of the Order of the British Empire; Companion of the Distinguished Service Order; Mentioned in Despatches (5); War Cross (Greece); Virtuti Militari (Poland); Army Distinguished Service Medal (United States); Legion of Merit (United States)
- Other work: Constable of the Tower of London

Field Marshal Henry Maitland Wilson, 1st Baron Wilson (5 September 1881 – 31 December 1964), also known as Jumbo Wilson, was a senior British Army officer of the 20th century. He saw active service in the Second Boer War and then during the First World War on the Somme and at Passchendaele. During the Second World War he served as general officer commanding-in-chief (GOC-in-C) British Troops in Egypt, in which role he launched Operation Compass, attacking Italian forces with considerable success, in December 1940. He went on to be Military Governor of Cyrenaica in February 1941, commanding a Commonwealth expeditionary force to Greece in April 1941 and general officer commanding (GOC) British Forces in Palestine and Trans-Jordan in May 1941.

Wilson became GOC Ninth Army in Syria and Palestine in October 1941, GOC Persia and Iraq Command in August 1942 and GOC Middle East Command in February 1943. He was Supreme Allied Commander in the Mediterranean from January 1944 and Chief of the British Joint Staff Mission in Washington D. C. from January 1945 until 1947.

== Early life and military service ==
Born in London, England, the son of Captain Arthur Maitland Wilson and his wife Harriet Wilson (née Kingscote), Wilson was educated at Eton College and the Royal Military College, Sandhurst. He was commissioned into the Rifle Brigade as a second lieutenant on 10 March 1900.

He served with the 2nd Battalion in South Africa in the Second Boer War, which had begun in October 1899, and having taken part in operations there in August 1900, was promoted to lieutenant on 18 March 1901. He served in South Africa throughout the war, which ended in June 1902.

Following the end of hostilities, he left Port Natal on the SS Malta in late September, together with other officers and men of the 2nd Battalion, Rifle Brigade, who were transferred to Egypt. He was posted with his battalion, commanded at one point by his uncle, Lieutenant Colonel H. F. M. Wilson, to Egypt and then in 1907 to India. Promoted to captain on 2 April 1908 he served with the 3rd Battalion, Rifle Brigade, at Bordon in Hampshire and then in County Tipperary in Ireland, and on 1 October 1911, after being seconded from his regiment in order to serve on the staff, became adjutant of the Oxford Officers Training Corps.

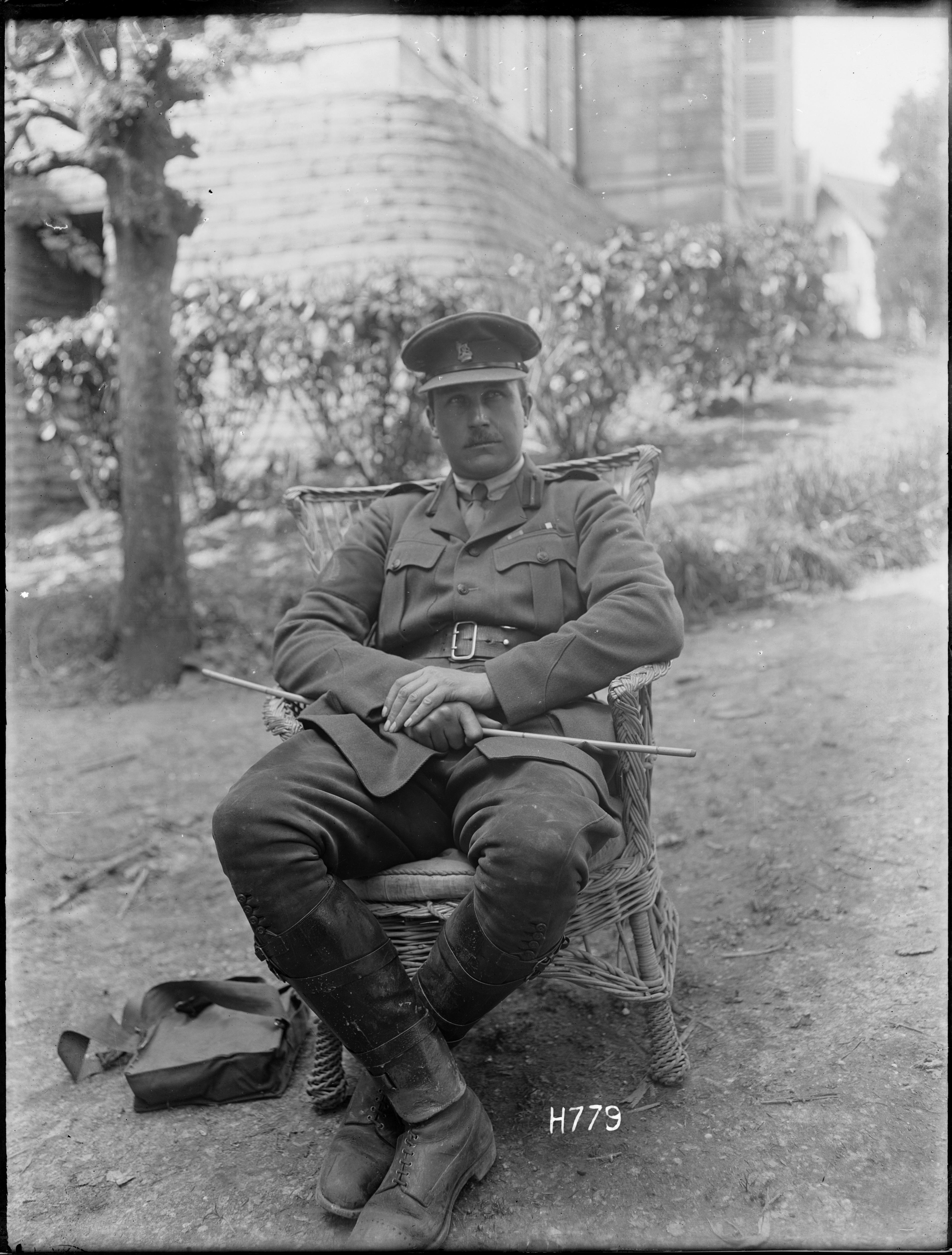
Wilson, a lieutenant colonel at the time, as a staff officer with the New Zealand Division, May 1918

Wilson served in the First World War, being appointed brigade major of the 48th Infantry Brigade on 15 October 1914; having been promoted to the rank of acting major in December 1914 and then to the substantive rank of major on 15 September 1915, he was sent to France to serve on the Western Front in December 1915. His capabilities as a staff officer led to him being moved to become general staff officer (GSO) 2 of the 41st Division on the Somme and of the XIX Corps at Passchendaele. In October 1917 he was appointed GSO 1 of the New Zealand Division with promotion to temporary lieutenant colonel on 28 October 1917. For his war service he was appointed a Companion of the Distinguished Service Order in 1917 and was thrice mentioned in despatches.

== Between the wars ==
After being promoted to brevet lieutenant colonel on 1 January 1919 and being hand-picked for the first post-war staff course at the Staff College, Camberley, Wilson was given command of a company of cadets at Sandhurst. He then became second-in-command of the 2nd Battalion, Rifle Brigade, at Aldershot in August 1923. Next, he took command of his regiment's 1st Battalion on the North-West Frontier in January 1927, receiving promotion to the substantive rank of lieutenant colonel on 15 June 1927.

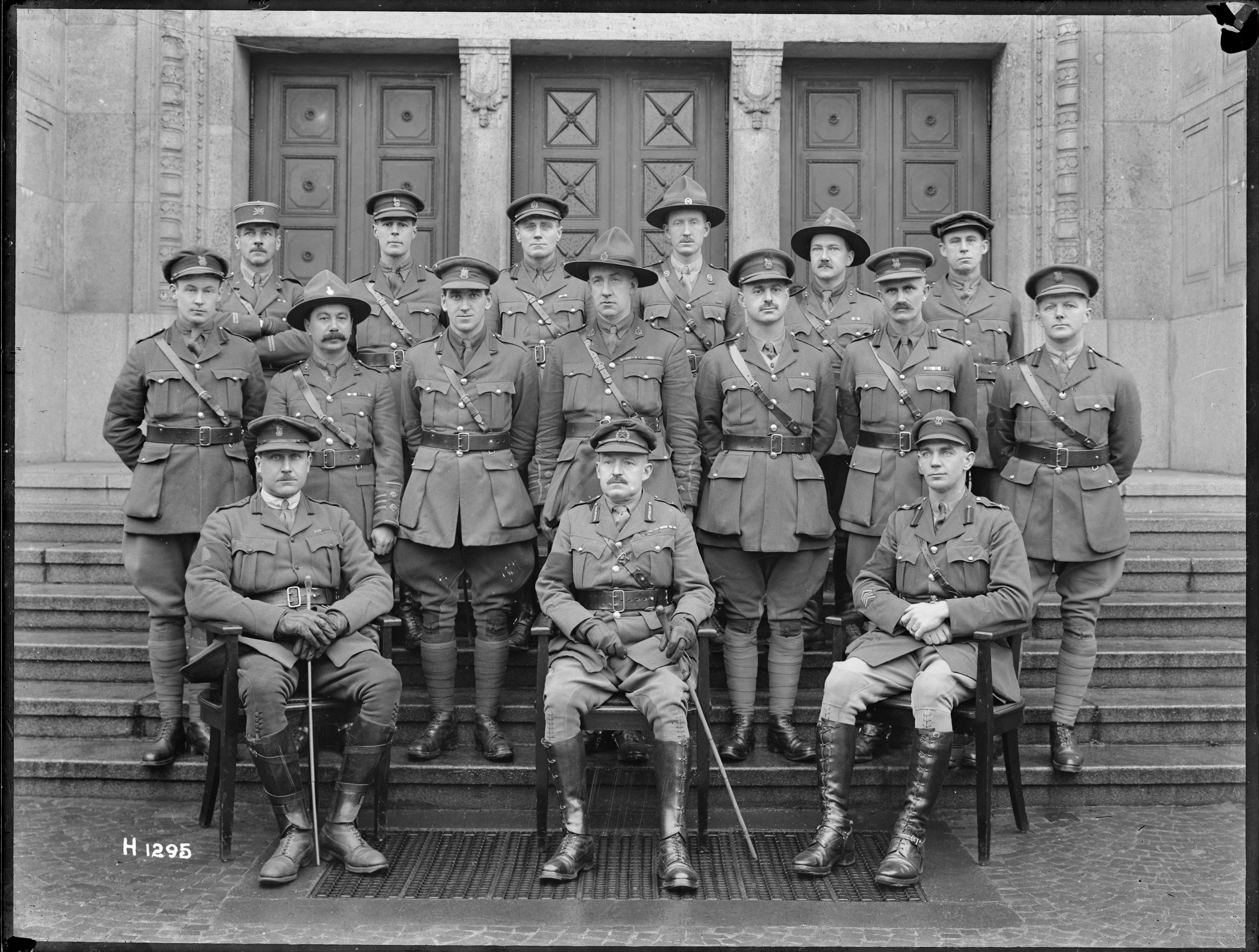
Group portrait of Major General Andrew Hamilton Russell (front row, centre), commanding the New Zealand Division, with staff officers at division headquarters in Leverkusen, Germany, March 1919. Present also is Lieutenant Colonel H. M. "Jumbo" Wilson, the division's GSO1, seated to Russell's right.

Returning to be an instructor at Camberley in June 1930, Wilson spent 9 months on half pay in 1933. Promoted to temporary brigadier, he became commander of 6th Infantry Brigade in 1934 and having been promoted to major-general on 30 April 1935, he became general officer commanding 2nd Division in August 1937.

== Second World War ==
=== Egypt (1939–1941) ===
On 15 June 1939, Wilson was appointed general officer commanding (GOC) of the British Troops in Egypt, with the rank of lieutenant-general, in which role he was also responsible for giving military advice for a range of countries from Abyssinia to the Persian Gulf. He made his HQ in Cairo and undertook successful negotiations with the Egyptian government at their summer quarters in Alexandria. The Treaty of 1936 called for the Egyptian army to fight under British command in the event of war and to supplement the limited force then at his disposal – an armoured division then being formed (later to be the 7th Armoured Division) and eight British battalions. He concentrated his defensive forces at Mersa Matruh some 100 miles from the border with Libya.

Early in August, Sir Archibald Wavell was appointed commander-in-chief of the Middle East Command, and he sent reinforcements which had been sought by Wilson, initially the 4th Indian Infantry Division and advanced elements of 6th Australian Division and, as the buildup at Mersa Matruh continued, Richard O'Connor and his staff at 7th Infantry Division in Palestine were moved to Egypt to reinforce Wilson's command structure there. O'Connor's HQ, initially designated British 6th Infantry Division, was activated in November and became responsible for the troops at Mersa Matruh. It was redesignated Western Desert Force in June 1940.

On 10 June 1940, Italian dictator Benito Mussolini declared war. Wilson's forces immediately invaded Libya. However, their advance was reversed when on 17 June France sought an armistice and the Italians were able to move their forces from the Tunisian border in the West and reinforce with 4 divisions those that opposed Wilson in the East. The Italian forces invaded Egypt in September 1940, and advanced some 60 miles (97 km) to occupy Sidi Barrani. Wilson was facing very superior forces. He had 31,000 troops to the Italians' 80,000, 120 tanks against 275, and 120 artillery pieces against 250. He realised that the situation was one where the traditional text books would not provide a solution. As with other 1940s commanders he had been well-schooled in strategy, and in thorough secrecy; he planned to disrupt the advance of the superior forces by attacking their extended lines at the right spots. After a conference with Anthony Eden and Wavell in October and rejecting Wavell's suggestion for a two-pronged attack, Wilson launched Operation Compass on 7 December 1940. The strategy was outstandingly successful and very quickly the Italian forces were cut in half.

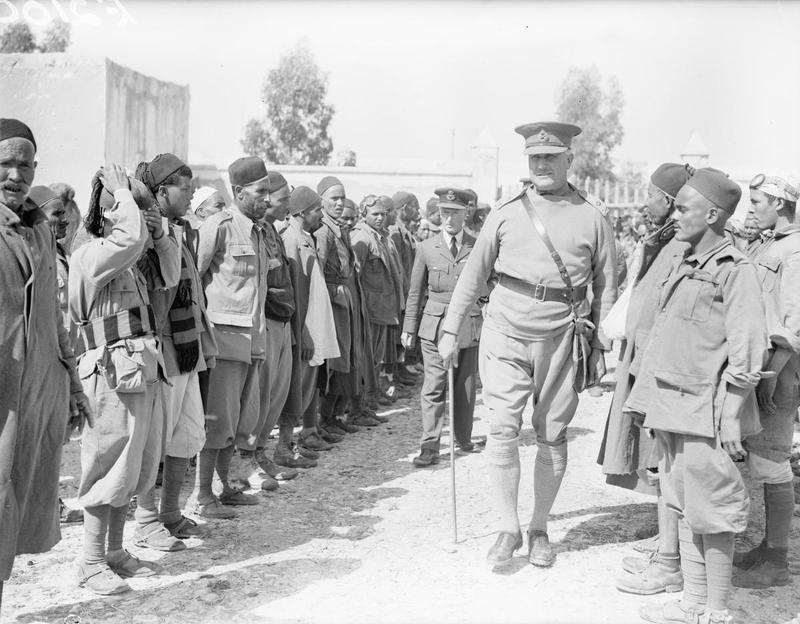
Lieutenant-General Sir Henry Maitland Wilson, Commander in Chief Cyrenaica, inspects men of the captured Tripolitanian Camel Corps, Libya.

While Operation Compass continued successfully in 1941 and resulted in the complete defeat of the Italian Army in North Africa, Wilson, who was already highly regarded by his First World War regimental colleague and now Secretary of State for War, Anthony Eden, had also won the confidence of Churchill himself. In a broadcast Churchill said, "General Wilson, who actually commands the Army of the Nile, was reputed to be one of our finest tacticians, and few will now deny him that quality."

Wilson was recalled to Cairo in February 1941 where he was offered and accepted the position of Military Governor of Cyrenaica.

=== Greece (April 1941) ===
Wilson was appointed to lead a Commonwealth expeditionary force ("W Force") of two infantry divisions and an armoured brigade to help Greece resist Italy and the subsequent German invasion in April 1941. Although the Allied forces were hopelessly inadequate Churchill's War Cabinet had thought it important to provide support for the only country outside the Commonwealth which was resisting the Axis advance. Wilson completed the evacuation of British troops from Greece on 29 April 1941. He was appointed a GBE on 4 March 1941 and promoted to full general on 31 May 1941.

=== Syria, Iraq and Palestine (1941–1943) ===
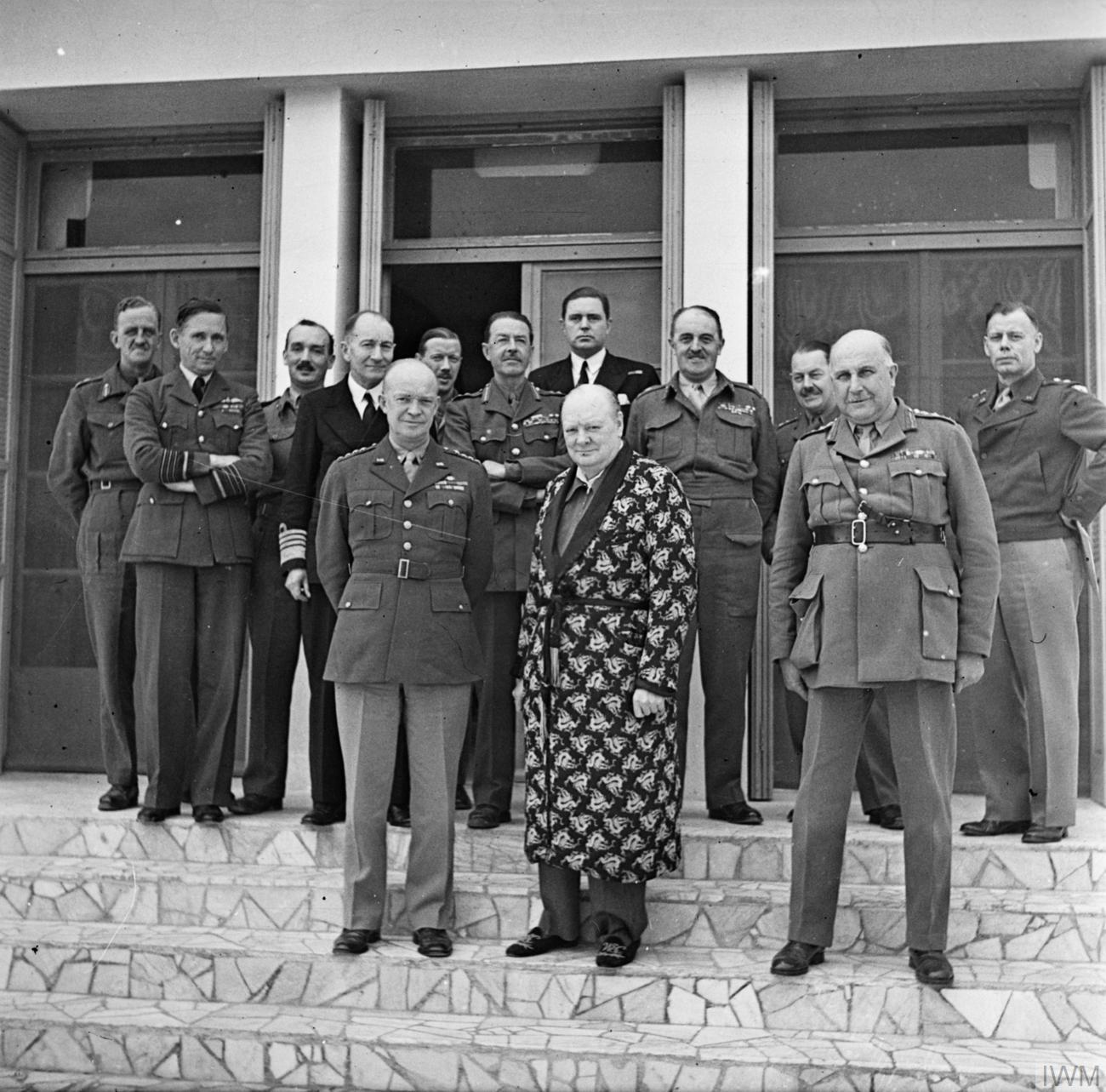
A convalescent Winston Churchill meets the outgoing and incoming Supreme Commanders in the Mediterranean, Dwight D. Eisenhower, to Churchill's right, and Henry Maitland Wilson, to his left. Behind them stand (from left to right), John Whiteley, Air Marshal Arthur Tedder, Brigadier G. S. Thompson, Admiral Sir John Cunningham, unknown, Sir Harold Alexander, Captain M. L. Power, Humfrey Gale, Leslie Hollis, and Eisenhower's chief of staff, Walter Bedell Smith.

In May 1941, on his return from Greece, Wilson was appointed GOC British Forces in Palestine and Trans-Jordan and oversaw the successful Syria-Lebanon campaign, in which predominantly Australian, British, Indian, and Free French forces overcame Vichy French forces in fierce fighting. In July 1941 Churchill recommended Wilson to take command of the Western Desert Force to lead it in its upcoming offensive operation against the Afrika Korps, what would become Operation Crusader of November 1941, but General Sir Claude Auchinleck preferred instead Lieutenant-general Sir Alan Cunningham. In October 1941 Wilson took command of the Ninth Army in Syria and Palestine and was appointed to the honorary title of Aide-de-Camp General to the King.

Wilson enjoyed the confidence of Winston Churchill and he was Churchill's choice to succeed Auchinleck as commander of the Eighth Army in August 1942; however at the urging of the Chief of the Imperial General Staff, General Sir Alan Brooke, General Sir Bernard Montgomery was appointed to the post. Instead, Wilson was appointed to command the newly created independent Persia and Iraq Command on 21 August 1942. This command, which had been part of Middle East Command, was created when it appeared that Germany, following successes in southern Russia, might invade Persia (Iran). (Note: The Chief of the Imperial General Staff, General Alan Brooke, had been reluctant to make this appointment because he thought Wilson was too old and tired for the job. However, he later wrote "...I was totally wrong as I soon discovered, and he was still capable of giving the most valuable service. An exceptionally clear brain, a strong personality and an imperturbable character.")

=== C-in-C Middle East (1943) ===
In February 1943, after Montgomery's success at Alamein and the expulsion of Axis forces from North Africa, Wilson was appointed commander-in-chief of the Middle East. The Middle East was by this time comparatively removed from the main centres of fighting. However, on orders from London to create a diversion during the fighting in Italy, in September 1943 he organised an unsuccessful attempt to occupy the small Greek islands of Kos, Leros and Samos. The British forces suffered large losses to German air attacks and subsequent landings.

=== Supreme Allied Commander Mediterranean (1944) ===
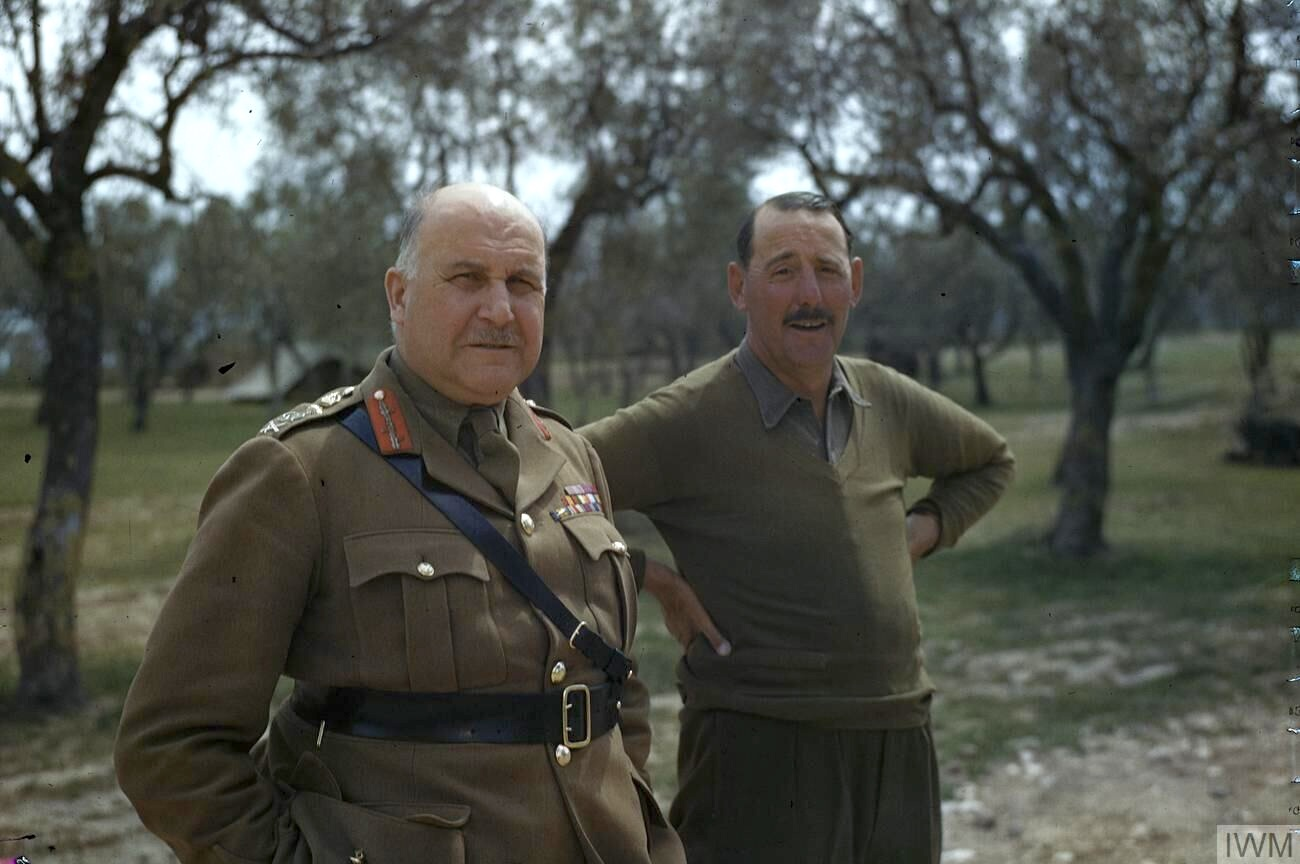
Wilson with Lieutenant-general Sir Oliver Leese, Italy, 30 April 1944

Wilson succeeded Dwight D. "Ike" Eisenhower at Allied Forces Headquarters (AFHQ) as the Supreme Allied Commander in the Mediterranean on 8 January 1944 based at Algiers. As such he exercised strategic control over the campaign in Italy. He strongly advocated the invasion of Germany via the Danube plain, but this did not take place when the armies in Italy were weakened to support other theatres of war. Jumbo Wilson was keen to follow through with the deception plan Undercut, when unexpectedly the Germans decided to withdraw from Greece altogether. Although advised by Dudley Clarke that it might backfire and was unnecessary, Wilson was aware of the strategic complexities of the political situation. The General Staff even employed an actor imitating Monty who arrived at Jumbo's HQ in Algiers. (Note: The deception operation on 26 May 1944 began in London.)

=== Washington Mission (1945–1947) ===
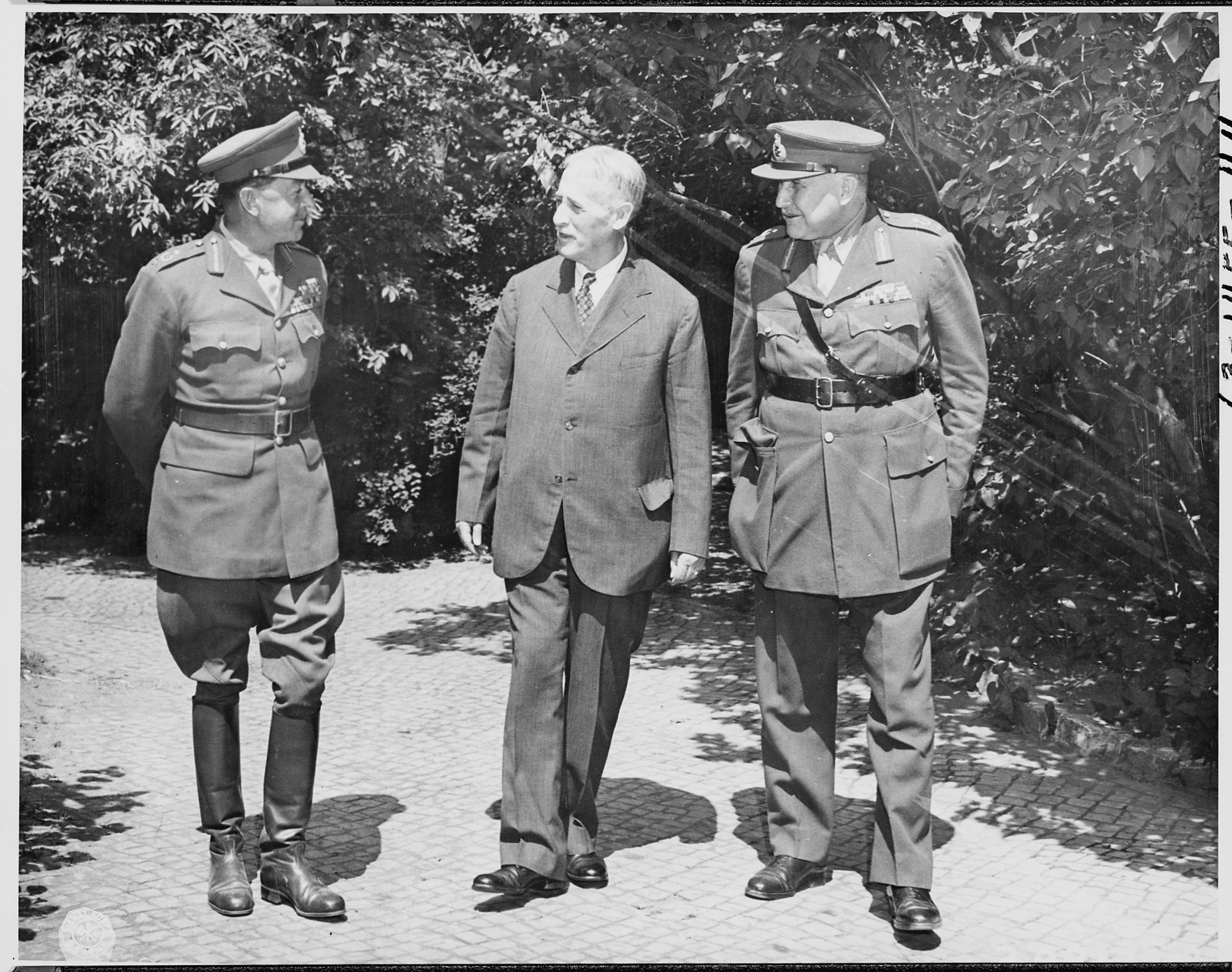
Secretary of War, Henry L. Stimson (centre) with Field Marshals Sir Harold Alexander (left) and Sir Henry Maitland Wilson (right)

In December 1944, following the death of Field Marshal Sir John Dill, Wilson was relieved as Supreme Commander, promoted to field marshal on 29 December 1944, and sent to Washington to be Chief of the British Joint Staff Mission, a post he took up in January 1945. One of Wilson's most secret duties was as the British military representative on the Combined Policy Committee which dealt with the development, production and testing of the atom bomb. Wilson continued to serve as head of the British Joint Staff Mission until 1947, to the satisfaction of Britain and the United States. President Truman awarded him the Distinguished Service Medal in November 1945.

== Post-war ==
In January 1946 he was appointed aide-de-camp to George VI of the United Kingdom and was then created Baron Wilson, of Libya and of Stowlangtoft in the County of Suffolk. From 1955 to 1960 he was Constable of the Tower of London. Wilson had married Hester Wykeham (1890–1979) in 1914 and had one son and a daughter. The son, Lieutenant-colonel Patrick Maitland Wilson, accompanied his father in the Middle East during the Second World War as an intelligence officer. The son's memoirs, Where the Nazis Came, provide anecdotes and descriptions of important events in his father's war service. Never a rich man, when Field Marshal Lord Wilson died on 31 December 1964 in Chilton, Buckinghamshire, his estate was proved at only £2,952 (roughly £100,000 in 2013). He was buried at St. George's, Stowlangtoft, Suffolk and was succeeded in the barony by his only son Patrick.

From his arrival in Egypt in 1939 to his return to England in 1947 from Washington, Jumbo Wilson spent eight years overseas. Few wartime commanders gave such unstinting and unremitting service. Of all Churchill's generals, his relationship with the Prime Minister was probably the closest. Though he is unlikely to be remembered in history as one of the great wartime field commanders, he deserves to be remembered, like Eisenhower, as a leader who moved nations to work together in a common cause.

== Sources ==
- Alanbrooke, Field Marshal Lord (edited by Alex Danchev and Daniel Todman) (2001). War Diaries 1939–1945. Phoenix Press. ISBN 1-84212-526-5.
- Churchill, Winston (1948). The Second World War 6 volumes. Cassell. ASIN B000H6E98Q.
- Fisher, Ernest F. Jr. (1993). United States Army in World War 2, Mediterranean Theater of Operations, Cassino to the Alps: With a Portfolio of Maps. Government Printing Office. ISBN 9780160613104.
- Heathcote, Tony (1999). The British Field Marshals 1736–1997. Barnsley (UK): Pen & Sword. ISBN 0-85052-696-5.
- Mead, Richard (2007). Churchill's Lions: A biographical guide to the key British generals of World War II. Stroud (UK): Spellmount. pp. 544 pages. ISBN 978-1-86227-431-0.
- Keegan, John (1999). Churchill's Generals. Abacus, 1999. ISBN 0349113173.

Military offices
| Preceded by Archibald Wavell | GOC 2nd Division; 1937–1939 | Succeeded by Charles Loyd |
| Preceded by Sir Robert Gordon-Finlsyson | GOC British Troops in Egypt; 1939–1941 | Succeeded by Sir Richard O'Connor |
| New post | Military Governor and GOC-in-C of Cyrenica; February 1941 | Succeeded by Philip Neame |
| Preceded by Philip Neame | GOC British Forces in Palestine and Trans-Jordan; May–October 1941 | Succeeded by Douglas McConnel |
| New post | GOC Ninth Army; 1941–1942 | Succeeded by Sir William Holmes |
| New post | C-in-C Persia and Iraq Command; 1942–1943 | Succeeded by Sir Henry Pownall |
| Preceded by Sir Harold Alexander | C-in-C Middle East Command; 1943–1944 | Succeeded by Sir Bernard Paget |
| Preceded by Dwight D. Eisenhower | Supreme Allied Commander Mediterranean Theatre; January–December 1944 | Succeeded by Sir Harold Alexander |
| Preceded by Sir John Dill | Chief of the British Joint Staff Mission to Washington; 1944–1947 | Succeeded by Sir Charles Medhurst |
Honorary titles
| Preceded by The Viscount Alanbrooke | Constable of the Tower of London; 1955–1960 | Succeeded by The Earl Alexander of Tunis |
Peerage of the United Kingdom
| New creation | Baron Wilson; 1946–1964 | Succeeded by Patrick Maitland Wilson |
