= Baron Wilson =

Extinct British peerage

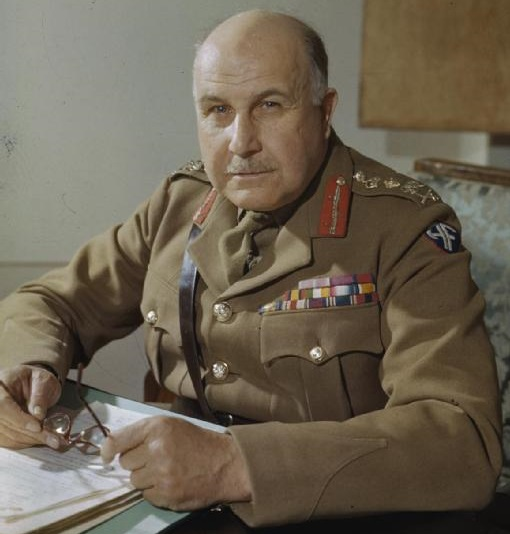
Henry Maitland Wilson, 1st Baron Wilson

Baron Wilson, of Libya and of Stowlangtoft in the County of Suffolk, was a title in the Peerage of the United Kingdom. It was created in 1946 for the prominent military commander Field Marshal Sir Henry Maitland Wilson. The title became extinct on the death of his only son, the second Baron, in 2009.

== Barons Wilson (1946) ==
- Henry Maitland Wilson, 1st Baron Wilson (1881–1964)
- Patrick Maitland Wilson, 2nd Baron Wilson (1915–2009)
