= Francis Grenfell, 1st Baron Grenfell =

British Army officer

Field Marshal The Right Honourable The Lord Grenfell GCB GCMG PC (Ire)
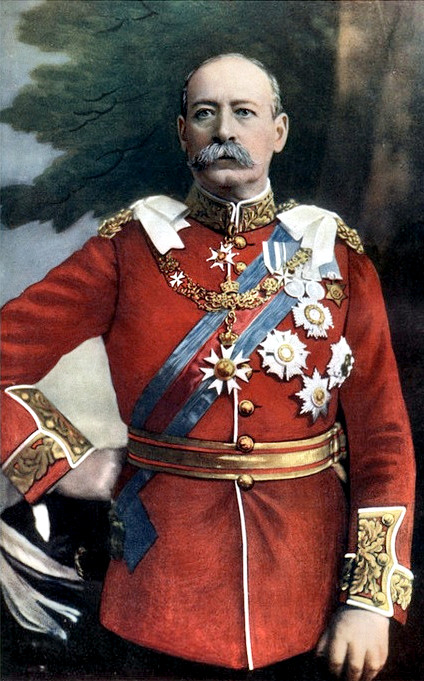
- Lord Grenfell circa 1900
- Born: 29 April 1841; Swansea, Wales, United Kingdom
- Died: 27 January 1925 (aged 83); Windlesham, Surrey, England, United Kingdom
- Burial place: Beaconsfield, Buckinghamshire
- Military career
- Allegiance: United Kingdom
- Branch: British Army
- Service years: 1859–1908
- Rank: Field Marshal
- Commands: Egyptian Army; 4th Army Corps; Commander-in-Chief, Ireland
- Conflicts: 9th Xhosa War; Anglo-Zulu War; Anglo-Egyptian War; Mahdist War
- Awards: Knight Grand Cross of the Order of the Bath; Knight Grand Cross of the Order of St Michael and St George
- Other work: Pilgrims Society; Church Lads' Brigade

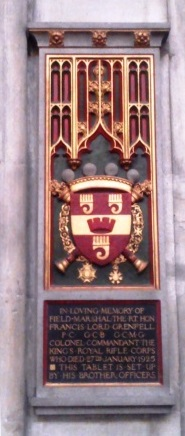
Winchester Cathedral, memorial for Field Marshal Lord Grenfell showing his coat of arms: Gules, on a fess between three clarions or a mural crown of the first.

Field Marshal Francis Wallace Grenfell, 1st Baron Grenfell, GCB, GCMG, PC (Ire) (29 April 1841 – 27 January 1925) was a British Army officer. After serving as aide-de-camp to the Commander-in-Chief, South Africa, he fought in the 9th Xhosa War, the Anglo-Zulu War and then the Anglo-Egyptian War. He went on to become Sirdar (Commander-in-Chief) of the Egyptian Army and commanded the forces at the Battle of Suakin in December 1888 and at the Battle of Toski in August 1889 during the Mahdist War. After that he became Governor of Malta and then Commander-in-Chief, Ireland before retiring in 1908.

== Early life and career ==
Born in Maesteg House, Swansea on 29 April 1841, the fourth son of Pascoe St Leger Grenfell and Catherine Anne Grenfell (née Du Pre), and grandson of Pascoe Grenfell, Francis Wallace Grenfell was educated at Milton Abbas School in Dorset but decided to leave school early.

== Military career ==
Grenfell purchased a commission as an ensign in the 3rd Battalion of the 60th Royal Rifles on 5 August 1859. He then purchased promotion to lieutenant on 21 July 1863 and to captain (in the last year in which purchase was allowed) on 28 October 1871. He became aide-de-camp to Sir Arthur Cunynghame, Commander-in-Chief, South Africa, in 1874. After taking part in the Battle of Quintana in February 1878 during the 9th Xhosa War in 1878, he was promoted to brevet major on 11 November 1878. He next fought at the Battle of Ulundi in July 1879 during the Anglo-Zulu War and then returned to England to become brigade major at Shorncliffe Army Camp shortly before he was promoted to brevet lieutenant colonel on 29 November 1879. He became brigade major of an infantry brigade in South Africa in April 1881 and, having been promoted to the substantive rank of major on 1 July 1881, he fought at the Battle of Tel el-Kebir in September 1882 during the Anglo-Egyptian War. Promoted to brevet colonel on 18 November 1882, he was made aide-de-camp to Queen Victoria that same year.

Grenfell became Deputy Sirdar (Commander-in-Chief) of the Egyptian Army in late 1882 and, after commanding the Egyptian troops stationed at Aswan during the Nile Expedition, he became Sirdar himself in April 1885. He was appointed Companion of the Order of the Bath on 25 August 1885, and having led his troops at the Battle of Ginnis in December 1885, was promoted to the substantive rank of lieutenant-colonel on 7 January 1886. He was advanced to Knight Commander of the Order of the Bath on 25 November 1886. He went on to command the forces at the Battle of Suakin in December 1888 and at the Battle of Toski in August 1889 during the Mahdist War and was promoted to major-general for distinguished service in the field on 3 August 1889. In recognition of the transformation he had achieved in making the Egyptian Army a successful fighting force, he was appointed a Knight Grand Cross of the Order of St Michael and St George (GCMG) on leaving Egypt on 25 May 1892.

The Battle of Toski, at which Grenfell commanded the British forces, during the Mahdist War

Returning to England Grenfell became Deputy Adjutant-General at the War Office in 1892 and Inspector General of Auxiliary Forces at the War Office in August 1894. He returned to Egypt as commander of the British Troops in Egypt (under the new Sirdar) in 1897, and having been promoted to lieutenant-general on 1 April 1898, he was advanced to Knight Grand Cross of the Order of the Bath on 15 November 1898. He became Governor of Malta with the local rank of general on 1 January 1899, serving as such until early 1903. The 1902 Coronation Honours list on 26 June 1902 included his name as a future peer, and he was created Baron Grenfell, of Kilvey in the County of Glamorgan on 15 July 1902. He took the oath on meeting in the House of Lords for the first time on 22 July 1902.

Lord Grenfell returned permanently to the United Kingdom to command the newly created 4th Army Corps from 1 April 1903. The IV Corps was based on the Eastern Command with headquarters in London. Following promotion to full general on 16 March 1904, he became Commander-in-Chief, Ireland and General Officer Commanding 3rd Army Corps in May 1904. He was promoted to field marshal on retirement on 11 April 1908. In May 1910 he attended the funeral of King Edward VII and in June 1911 he attended the coronation of King George V.

Grenfell served as colonel of the 1st Surrey (South London) Volunteer Regiment from 1889 to 1902, colonel of the 2nd Regiment of Life Guards and then colonel of the 1st Regiment of Life Guards as well as, latterly, colonel commandant the King's Royal Rifle Corps and colonel of the King's Own Malta Regiment of Militia.

Grenfell was Governor and Commandant of the Church Lads' Brigade from 1908 to 1925. In 1914, he was responsible for raising the 16th (Service) Battalion, King's Royal Rifle Corps (Church Lads' Brigade) as a battalion for CLB members wishing to enlist. He was also a founding committee member of the Pilgrims Society in 1902.

Grenfell received the Honorary Freedom of the Borough from his native town Swansea in 1889.

He died aged 83 at Windlesham in Surrey on 27 January 1925 and was buried at St Mary and All Saints Churchyard at Beaconsfield in Buckinghamshire.

== Legacy ==
Grenfell Road, which runs through North Kensington, London was named after Grenfell; the road later lent its name to Grenfell Tower which was built in 1974. In June 2017, Grenfell Tower caught fire, causing 72 deaths.

== Family ==
In 1887 Grenfell married Evelyn Wood, daughter of Major General Robert Blucher Wood; they had no children. Following the death of his first wife, he married Margaret Majendie (daughter of Lewis Majendie MP) in 1903; they had two sons and a daughter.

== Arms ==
Coat of arms of Francis, 1st Baron Grenfell
Crest On the battlements of a tower gules, a griffin passant or, holding in the beak a sprig of laurel. Escutcheon Gules, on a fess between three organ rests or, a mural crown of the first. Surrounded by the collars, with badges pendant, of the orders of the Bath and St. Michael and St. George. Supporters Dexter: An Egyptian cavalryman. Sinister: An Egyptian infantryman. Motto Loyal devoir (Honest duty). Orders Order of the Bath military division (GCB); Order of St.Michael and St.George (GCMG)

== Honours and decorations ==
- GCB: Knight Grand Cross of the Order of the Bath – 15 November 1898
- GCMG: Knight Grand Cross of the Order of St Michael and St George – 25 May 1892 – on leaving Egypt
- LL.D. (honorary), University of Cambridge, May 1902.
- LL.D. (honorary), University of Edinburgh, 26 July 1902.
- Honorary Freeman of Swansea, 1889

=== Foreign decorations ===
Grenfell was awarded the Order of the Medjidie (second class) and the Order of Osmanieh (third class) on 27 May 1886. He was advanced to the Order of the Medjidie (first class) on 17 May 1888 and to the Order of Osmanieh (first class) on 25 July 1892. And also awarded; a 'Coronation medal', Order of the Red Eagle from Germany, Order of Alexander Nevsky from Russia, Order of Saints Maurice and Lazarus from Italy.

== Sources ==
- Hesilrige, Arthur G. M. (1921). Debrett's Peerage and Titles of courtesy. 160A, Fleet street, London, UK: Dean & Son. p. 420.
- Heathcote, Tony (1999). The British Field Marshals 1736–1997. Barnsley (UK): Pen & Sword. ISBN 0-85052-696-5.

Military offices
Preceded by Sir Evelyn Wood	Sirdar of the Egyptian Army; 1885–1892	Succeeded by Lord Kitchener
Preceded by Sir Charles Knowles	GOC British Troops in Egypt; 1897–1899	Succeeded by Sir Reginald Talbot
Government offices
Preceded by Sir Arthur Lyon Fremantle	Governor of Malta; 1899–1903	Succeeded by Sir Charles Clarke
Military offices
Preceded by The Duke of Connaught	Commander-in-Chief, Ireland; 1904–1908	Succeeded by Sir Neville Lyttelton
Honorary titles
Preceded by Sir Redvers Buller	Colonel-Commandant of the 2nd Battalion, King's Royal Rifle Corps; 1898–1908	Succeeded by Sir Edward Hutton
Preceded by The Lord Chelmsford	Colonel of the 2nd Regiment of Life Guards; 1905–1907	Succeeded by The Earl of Dundonald
Preceded by The Lord de Ros	Colonel of the 1st Regiment of Life Guards; 1907–1920	Succeeded by The Viscount Allenby
Preceded by Sir Redvers Buller	Colonel-Commandant of the 1st Battalion, King's Royal Rifle Corps; 1908–1925	Succeeded by Sir Thomas Morland
Peerage of the United Kingdom
New creation	Baron Grenfell; 1902–1925	Succeeded by Pascoe Grenfell
