= Herbert Kitchener, 1st Earl Kitchener =

British army officer and colonial administrator (1850–1916)

Field Marshal The Right Honourable The Earl Kitchener KG KP GCB OM GCSI GCMG GCIE PC
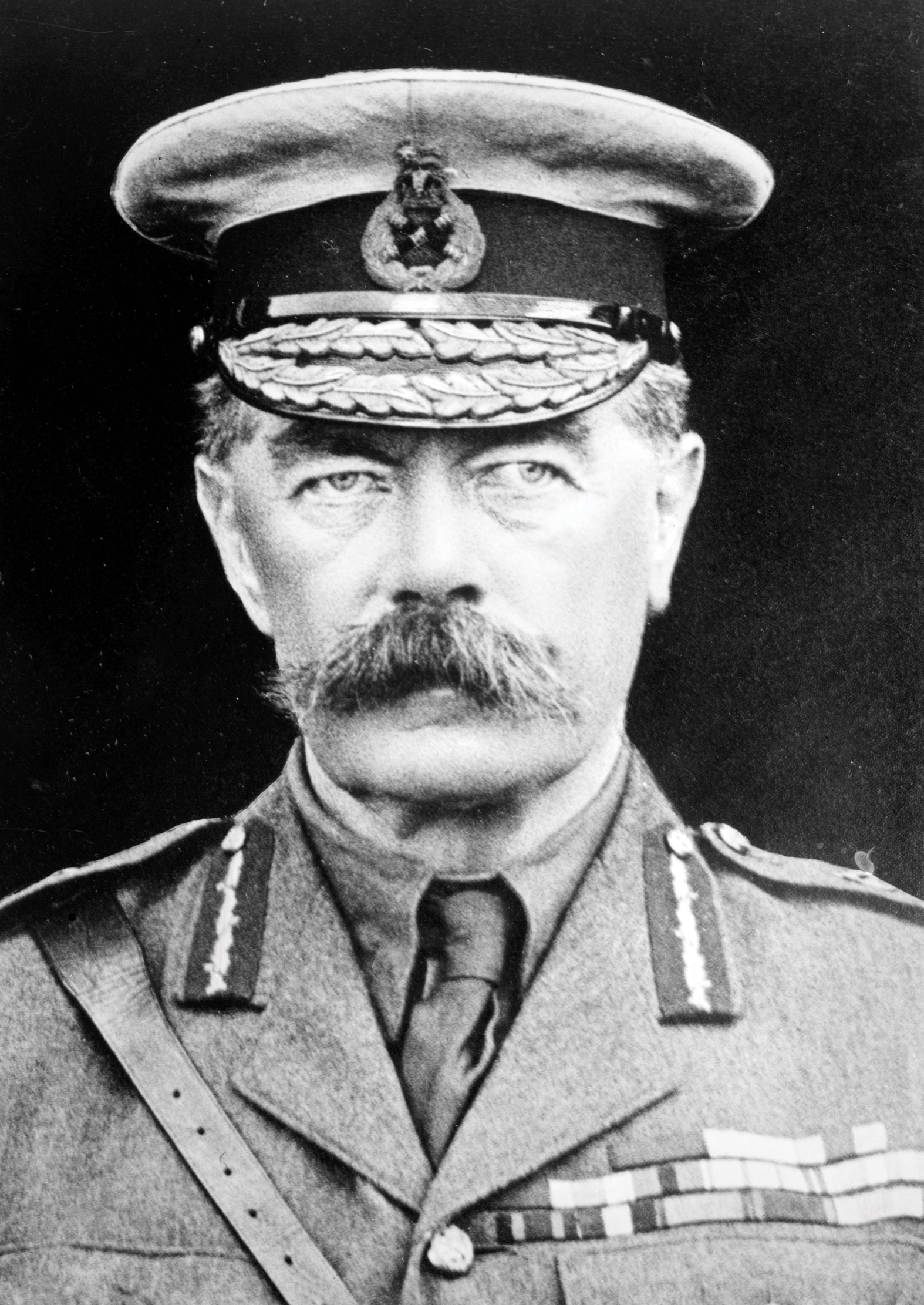
- Kitchener c. 1914–1916

Secretary of State for War
- In office 5 August 1914 – 5 June 1916
- Monarch: George V
- Prime Minister: H. H. Asquith
- Preceded by: H. H. Asquith
- Succeeded by: David Lloyd George

Consul-General in Egypt
- In office 12 July 1911 – 5 August 1914
- Preceded by: Sir Eldon Gorst
- Succeeded by: Sir Milne Cheetham

Member of the House of Lords Lord Temporal
- In office 1 November 1898 – 5 June 1916; Hereditary peerage
- Preceded by: Peerage created
- Succeeded by: Henry Kitchener, 2nd Earl Kitchener

Governor-General of Sudan
- In office 2 September 1898 – 22 December 1899
- Preceded by: Abdallahi ibn Muhammad (Mahdist State)
- Succeeded by: Reginald Wingate (Anglo-Egyptian Sudan)

Personal details
- Born: 24 June 1850 Gunsborough Villa, north of Listowel, County Kerry, Ireland
- Died: 5 June 1916 (aged 65) HMS Hampshire, west of Orkney, Scotland
- Cause of death: Killed in action
- Relations: Henry Kitchener, 2nd Earl Kitchener (older brother); Sir Walter Kitchener (younger brother)
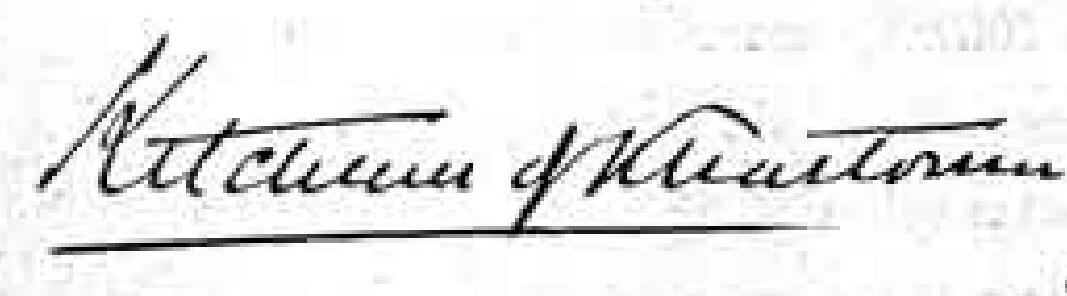
- Signature
- Nickname: "Kitch"

Military service
- Allegiance: United Kingdom
- Branch/service: British Army
- Years of service: 1871–1916
- Rank: Field marshal
- Commands: Commander-in-Chief, India (1902–1909); British Forces in South Africa (1900–1902); Egyptian Army (1892–1899)
- Battles/wars: Franco-Prussian War; Mahdist War; Second Boer War; First World War †
- Awards: Complete list

Field Marshal Horatio Herbert Kitchener, 1st Earl Kitchener (/ˈkɪtʃɪnər/; 24 June 1850 – 5 June 1916) was a British Army officer and colonial administrator. Kitchener came to prominence for his imperial campaigns, his involvement in the Second Boer War, and his central role in the early part of the First World War.

Kitchener was credited in 1898 for having won the Battle of Omdurman and securing control of the Sudan, for which he was made Baron Kitchener of Khartoum. As Chief of Staff (1900–1902) in the Second Boer War he played a key role in Lord Roberts' conquest of the Boer Republics, then succeeded Roberts as commander-in-chief – by which time Boer forces had taken to guerrilla fighting and British forces imprisoned Boer and African civilians in concentration camps. His term as commander-in-chief (1902–1909) of the Army in India saw him quarrel with another eminent proconsul, the viceroy Lord Curzon, who eventually resigned. Kitchener then returned to Egypt as British agent and consul-general (de facto administrator).

In 1914, at the start of the First World War, Kitchener became secretary of state for war, a cabinet minister. One of the few to foresee a long war, lasting for at least three years, and having the authority to act effectively on that perception, he organised the largest volunteer army that Britain had seen, and oversaw a significant expansion of material production to fight on the Western Front. Despite having warned of the difficulty of provisioning for a long war, he was blamed for the shortage of shells in the spring of 1915 – one of the events leading to the formation of a coalition government – and stripped of his control over munitions and strategy.

On 5 June 1916, Kitchener was making his way to Russia on HMS Hampshire to attend negotiations with Emperor Nicholas II when in bad weather the ship struck a German mine 1.5 miles (2.4 km) west of Orkney, Scotland, and sank. Kitchener was among 737 who died.

== Early life ==
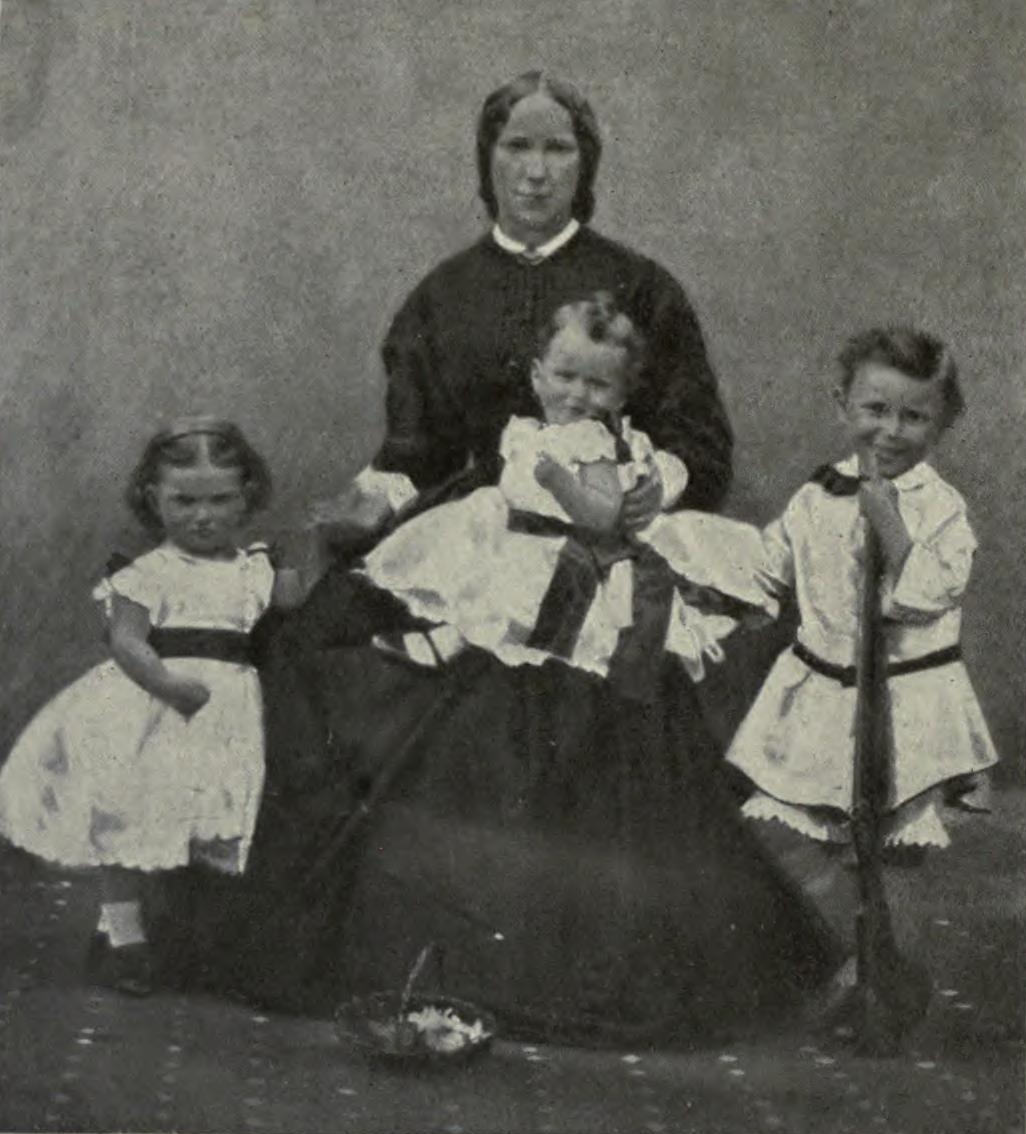
Kitchener on his mother's lap, with his brother and sister

Kitchener was born at Gunsborough Villa, north of Listowel, County Kerry, in Ireland, son of army officer Henry Horatio Kitchener (1805–1894) and Frances Anne Chevallier (1826–1864); daughter of John Chevallier, a clergyman, of Aspall Hall, and his third wife, Elizabeth (née Cole).

Both sides of Kitchener's family were from Suffolk, and could trace their descent to the reign of William III; his mother's family was of French Huguenot descent. His father had only recently sold his commission and bought land in Ireland, under the Incumbered Estates (Ireland) Act 1849 designed to encourage investment into Ireland after the Irish Famine.

In later life Kitchener only once revisited his childhood home, in the summer of 1910 at the invitation of Henry Petty-Fitzmaurice, 5th Marquess of Lansdowne; he astonished the estate's owners by recalling the Irish names of many of the fields. Although sometimes labelled by military historians as Irish or Anglo-Irish (a group which provided a disproportionate number of senior British officers – see Irish military diaspora), Kitchener did not regard himself as such and was known to quote the saying misattributed to the Duke of Wellington that "a man may be born in a stable, but that does not make him a horse".

In 1864 the family moved to Switzerland, where the young Kitchener was educated at Montreux, then at the Royal Military Academy, Woolwich. Pro-French and eager to see action, he joined a French field ambulance unit in the Franco-Prussian War. His father took him back to Britain after he caught pneumonia while ascending in a balloon to see the French Army of the Loire in action.

Commissioned into the Royal Engineers on 4 January 1871, Kitchener was reprimanded by the Duke of Cambridge, the commander-in-chief, as his service in France had violated British neutrality. He served in Palestine, Egypt and Cyprus as a surveyor, learned Arabic, and prepared detailed topographical maps of the areas. His brother, Lt. Gen. Sir Walter Kitchener, had also entered the army and was Governor of Bermuda from 1908 until his death in 1912.

== Survey of western Palestine ==
In 1874, aged 24, Kitchener was assigned by the Palestine Exploration Fund to a mapping-survey of the Holy Land, replacing Charles Tyrwhitt-Drake, who had died of malaria. By then an officer in the Royal Engineers, Kitchener joined fellow officer Claude R. Conder; between 1874 and 1877 they surveyed Palestine, returning to England only briefly in 1875 after an attack by locals at Safed, in Galilee.

Conder and Kitchener's expedition became known as the Survey of Western Palestine because it was largely confined to the area west of the Jordan River. The survey collected data on the topography and toponymy of the area, as well as local flora and fauna. The results of the survey were published in an eight-volume series, with Kitchener's contribution in the first three tomes.

This survey has had a lasting effect on the Middle East for several reasons:

- It serves as the basis for the grid system used in the modern maps of Israel and Palestine;
- The data compiled by Conder and Kitchener are still consulted by archaeologists and geographers working in the southern Levant;
- The survey itself effectively delineated and defined the political borders of the southern Levant. For example, the modern border between Israel and Lebanon is established at the point in upper Galilee where Conder and Kitchener's survey stopped.

In 1878, having completed the survey of western Palestine, Kitchener was sent to Cyprus to undertake a survey of that newly acquired British protectorate. He became vice-consul in Anatolia in 1879.

== Egypt ==
On 4 January 1883, Kitchener was promoted to captain, given the Turkish rank bimbashi (major), and dispatched to Egypt, where he took part in the reconstruction of the Egyptian Army.

Egypt had recently become a British puppet state, its army led by British officers, although still nominally under the sovereignty of the Khedive (Egyptian viceroy) and his nominal overlord the Ottoman sultan. Kitchener became second-in-command of an Egyptian cavalry regiment in February 1883, and then took part in the failed Nile Expedition to relieve Charles George Gordon in the Sudan in late 1884.

Fluent in Arabic, Kitchener preferred the company of the Egyptians over the British, and the company of no-one over the Egyptians, writing in 1884 that: "I have become such a solitary bird that I often think I were happier alone". Kitchener spoke Arabic so well that he was able to effortlessly adopt the dialects of the different Bedouin tribes of Egypt and the Sudan.

Promoted to brevet major on 8 October 1884 and to brevet lieutenant-colonel on 15 June 1885, he became the British member of the Zanzibar boundary commission in July 1885. He became Governor of the Egyptian Provinces of Eastern Sudan and Red Sea Littoral (which in practice consisted of little more than the Port of Suakin) in September 1886, also Pasha the same year, and led his forces in action against the followers of the Mahdi at Handub in January 1888, when he was injured in the jaw.

Kitchener was promoted to brevet colonel on 11 April 1888 and to the substantive rank of major on 20 July 1889 and led the Egyptian cavalry at the Battle of Toski in August 1889. At the beginning of 1890 he was appointed inspector general of the Egyptian police 1888–92 before moving to the position of Adjutant-General of the Egyptian Army in December of the same year and Sirdar (commander-in-chief) of the Egyptian Army with the local rank of brigadier in April 1892.

Kitchener was worried that, although his moustache was bleached white by the sun, his blond hair refused to turn grey, making it harder for Egyptians to take him seriously. His appearance added to his mystique: his long legs made him appear taller, whilst a cast in his eye made people feel he was looking right through them. Kitchener, at 6 ft 2 in (1.88 m), towered over most of his contemporaries.

Sir Evelyn Baring, the de facto British ruler of Egypt, thought Kitchener "the most able (soldier) I have come across in my time". In 1890, a War Office evaluation of Kitchener concluded: "A good brigadier, very ambitious, not popular, but has of late greatly improved in tact and manner ... a fine gallant soldier and good linguist and very successful in dealing with Orientals" [in the 19th century, Europeans called the Middle East the Orient].

While in Egypt, Kitchener was initiated into Freemasonry in 1883 in the Italian-speaking La Concordia Lodge No. 1226, which met in Cairo. In November 1899 he was appointed the first District Grand Master of the District Grand Lodge of Egypt and the Sudan, under the United Grand Lodge of England.

== Sudan and Khartoum ==
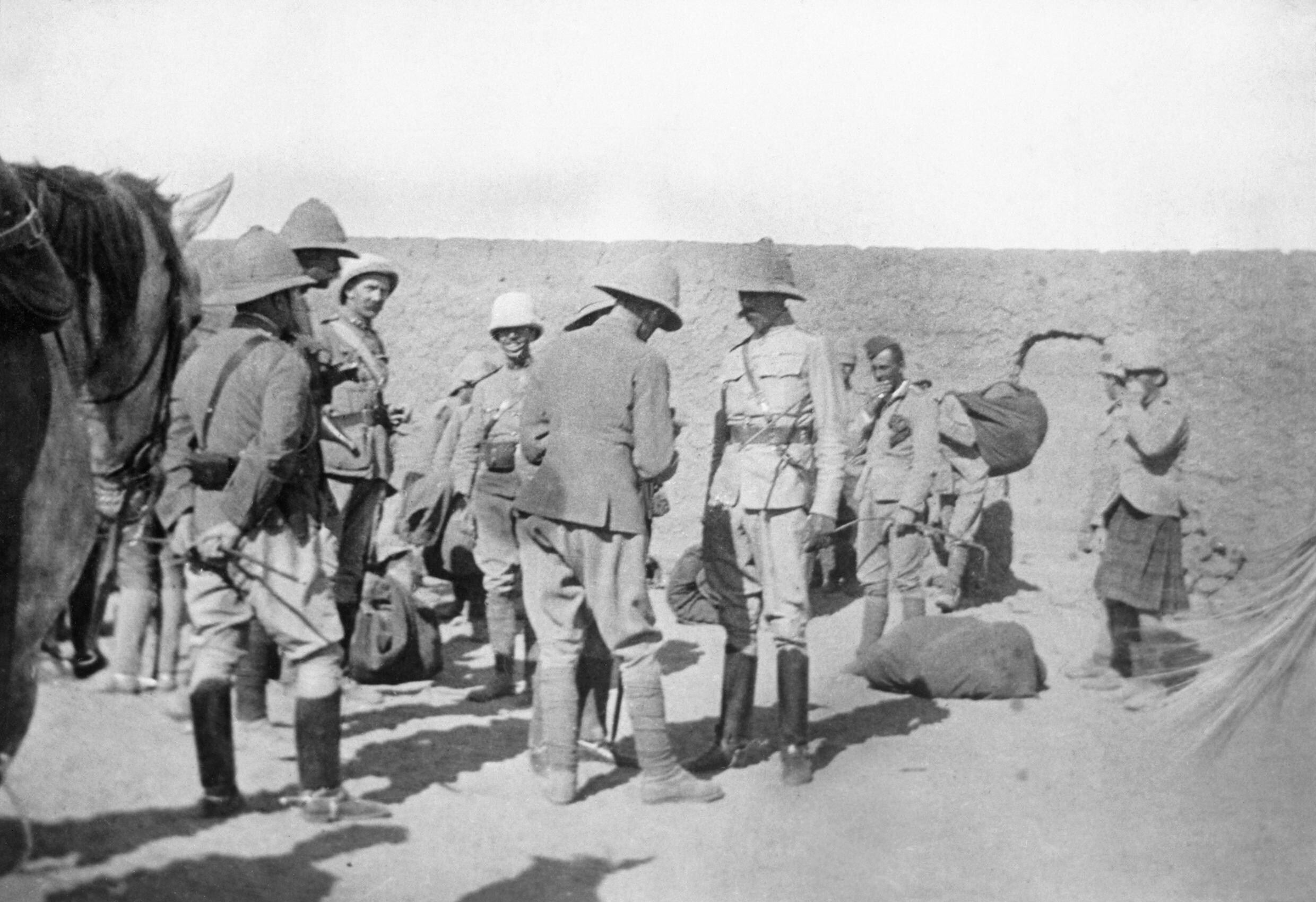
Kitchener, Commander of the Egyptian Army (centre right), 1898

In 1896, the British Prime Minister, Lord Salisbury, was concerned with keeping France out of the Horn of Africa. A French expedition under the command of Jean-Baptiste Marchand had left Dakar in March 1896 with the aim of conquering the Sudan, seizing control of the Nile as it flowed into Egypt, and forcing the British out of Egypt; thus restoring Egypt to the place within the French sphere of influence that it had had prior to 1882. Salisbury feared that if the British did not conquer the Sudan, the French would. He had supported Italy's ambitions to conquer Ethiopia in the hope that the Italians would keep the French out of Ethiopia. The Italian attempt to conquer Ethiopia, however, was going very badly by early 1896, and ended with the Italians being annihilated at the Battle of Adowa in March 1896. In March 1896, with the Italians visibly failing and the Mahdist State threatening to conquer Italian Eritrea, Salisbury ordered Kitchener to invade northern Sudan, ostensibly for the purpose of distracting the Ansar (whom the British called "Dervishes") from attacking the Italians.

Kitchener won victories at the Battle of Ferkeh in June 1896 and the Battle of Hafir in September 1896, earning him national fame in the United Kingdom and promotion to major general on 25 September 1896, "for distinguished service in the field, in recognition of his services during the recent operations on the Nile". Kitchener's cold personality and his tendency to drive his men hard made him widely disliked by his fellow officers. One officer wrote about Kitchener in September 1896: "He was always inclined to bully his own entourage, as some men are rude to their wives. He was inclined to let off his spleen on those around him. He was often morose and silent for hours together ... he was even morbidly afraid of showing any feeling or enthusiasm, and he preferred to be misunderstood rather than be suspected of human feeling." Kitchener had served on the Wolseley expedition to rescue General Charles George Gordon at Khartoum, and was convinced that the expedition failed because Wolseley had used boats coming up the Nile to bring his supplies. Kitchener wanted to build a railway to supply the Anglo-Egyptian army, and assigned the task of constructing the Sudan Military Railway to a Canadian railway builder, Percy Girouard, for whom he had specifically asked.

Kitchener achieved further successes at the Battle of Atbara in April 1898, and then the Battle of Omdurman in September 1898. After marching to the walls of Khartoum, he placed his army into a crescent shape with the Nile to the rear, together with the gunboats in support. This enabled him to bring overwhelming firepower against any attack of the Ansar from any direction, though with the disadvantage of having his men spread out thinly, with hardly any forces in reserve. Such an arrangement could have proven disastrous if the Ansar had broken through the thin khaki line. At about 5 a.m. on 2 September 1898, a huge force of Ansar, under the command of the Khalifa himself, came out of the fort at Omdurman, marching under their black banners inscribed with Koranic quotations in Arabic; this led Bennet Burleigh, the Sudan correspondent of The Daily Telegraph, to write: "It was not alone the reverberation of the tread of horses and men's feet I heard and seemed to feel as well as hear, but a voiced continuous shouting and chanting-the Dervish invocation and battle challenge "Allah e Allah Rasool Allah el Mahdi!" they reiterated in vociferous rising measure, as they swept over the intervening ground".

Kitchener had the ground carefully studied so his officers would know the best angle of fire, and had his army open fire on the Ansar first with artillery, then machine guns and finally rifles as the enemy advanced. A young Winston Churchill, serving as an army officer, wrote of what he saw: "A ragged line of men were coming on desperately, struggling forward in the face of the pitiless fire – black banners tossing and collapsing; white figures subsiding in dozens to the ground ... valiant men were struggling on through a hell of whistling metal, exploding shells, and spurting dust – suffering, despairing, dying". By about 8:30 am, much of the Dervish army was dead; Kitchener ordered his men to advance, fearing that the Khalifa might escape with what was left of his army to the fort of Omdurman, forcing Kitchener to lay siege to it.

Viewing the battlefield from horseback on the hill at Jebel Surgham, Kitchener commented: "Well, we have given them a damn good dusting". As the British and Egyptians advanced in columns, the Khalifa attempted to outflank and encircle the columns; this led to desperate hand-to-hand fighting. Churchill wrote of his own experience as the 21st Lancers cut their way through the Ansar: "The collision was prodigious and for perhaps ten wonderful seconds, no man heeded his enemy. Terrified horses wedged in the crowd, bruised and shaken men, sprawling in heaps, struggle dazed and stupid, to their feet, panted and looked about them". The Lancers' onslaught carried them through the 12-men-deep Ansar line with the Lancers losing 71 dead and wounded while killing hundreds of the enemy. Following the annihilation of his army, the Khalifa ordered a retreat and early in the afternoon, Kitchener rode in triumph into Omdurman and immediately ordered that the thousands of Christians enslaved by the Ansar were now all free people. Kitchener lost fewer than 500 men while killing about 11,000 and wounding 17,000 of the Ansar. Burleigh summed the general mood of the British troops: "At Last! Gordon has been avenged and justified. The dervishes have been overwhelming routed, Mahdism has been "smashed", while the Khalifa's capital of Omdurman has been stripped of its barbaric halo of sanctity and invulnerability.

Kitchener promptly had the Mahdi's tomb blown up to prevent it from becoming a rallying point for his supporters, and had his bones scattered. Queen Victoria, who had wept when she heard of General Gordon's death, now wept for the man who had vanquished Gordon, asking whether it had been really necessary for Kitchener to desecrate the Mahdi's tomb.The body of the Mahdi was disinterred and beheaded. This symbolic decapitation echoed General Gordon's death at the hands of the Mahdist forces in 1885. The headless body of the Mahdi was thrown into the Nile. Kitchener is sometimes claimed to have kept the Mahdī's skull and rumoured that he intended to use it as a drinking cup or ink well. Other historians state that he had the head buried unmarked in a Muslim cemetery. In a letter to his mother, Churchill wrote that the victory at Omdurman had been "disgraced by the inhuman slaughter of the wounded and ... Kitchener is responsible for this". There is no evidence that Kitchener ordered his men to shoot the wounded Ansar on the field of Omdurman but he did give before the battle what the British journalist Mark Urban called a "mixed message", saying that mercy should be given, while at the same time saying "Remember Gordon" and that the enemy were all "murderers" of Gordon. The victory at Omdurman made Kitchener into a popular war hero, and gave him a reputation for efficiency and as a man who got things done. The journalist G. W. Steevens wrote in the Daily Mail that "He [Kitchener] is more like a machine than a man. You feel that he ought to be patented and shown with pride at the Paris International Exhibition. British Empire: Exhibit No. 1 hors concours, the Sudan Machine". The shooting of the wounded at Omdurman, along with the desecration of the Mahdi's tomb, gave Kitchener a reputation for brutality that was to dog him for the rest of his life, and posthumously.

After Omdurman, Kitchener opened a special sealed letter from Salisbury that told him that Salisbury's real reason for ordering the conquest of the Sudan was to prevent France from moving into the Sudan, and that the talk of "avenging Gordon" had been just a pretext. Salisbury's letter ordered Kitchener to head south as soon as possible to evict Marchand before he got a chance to become well-established on the Nile. On 18 September 1898, Kitchener arrived at the French fort at Fashoda (present day Kodok, on the west bank of the Nile north of Malakal) and informed Marchand that he and his men had to leave the Sudan at once, a request Marchand refused, leading to a tense stand-off as French and British soldiers aimed their weapons at each other. During what became known as the Fashoda Incident, Britain and France almost went to war with each other.

The Fashoda Incident caused much jingoism and chauvinism on both sides of the English Channel; however, at Fashoda itself, despite the stand-off with the French, Kitchener established cordial relations with Marchand. They agreed that the tricolor would fly equally with the Union Jack and the Egyptian flag over the disputed fort at Fashoda. Kitchener was a Francophile who spoke fluent French, and despite his reputation for brusque rudeness was very diplomatic and tactful in his talks with Marchand; for example, congratulating him on his achievement in crossing the Sahara in an epic trek from Dakar to the Nile. In November 1898, the crisis ended when the French agreed to withdraw from the Sudan. Several factors persuaded the French to back down. These included British naval superiority; the prospect of an Anglo-French war leading to the British gobbling up the entire French colonial empire after the defeat of the French Navy; the pointed statement from the Russian emperor Nicholas II that the Franco-Russian alliance applied only to Europe, and that Russia would not go to war against Britain for the sake of an obscure fort in the Sudan in which no Russian interests were involved; and the possibility that Germany might take advantage of an Anglo-French war to strike France.

Kitchener became Governor-General of the Sudan in September 1898, and began a programme of restoring good governance. The programme had a strong foundation, based on education at Gordon Memorial College as its centrepiece – and not simply for the children of the local elites, for children from anywhere could apply to study. He ordered the mosques of Khartoum rebuilt, instituted reforms which recognised Friday – the Muslim holy day – as the official day of rest, and guaranteed freedom of religion to all citizens of the Sudan. He attempted to prevent evangelical Christian missionaries from trying to convert Muslims to Christianity.

At this stage of his career Kitchener was keen to exploit the press, cultivating G. W. Steevens of the Daily Mail who wrote a book With Kitchener to Khartum. Later, as his legend had grown, he was able to be rude to the press, on one occasion in the Second Boer War bellowing: "Get out of my way, you drunken swabs". He was created Baron Kitchener, of Khartoum and of Aspall in the County of Suffolk, on 31 October 1898.

== Anglo-Boer War ==
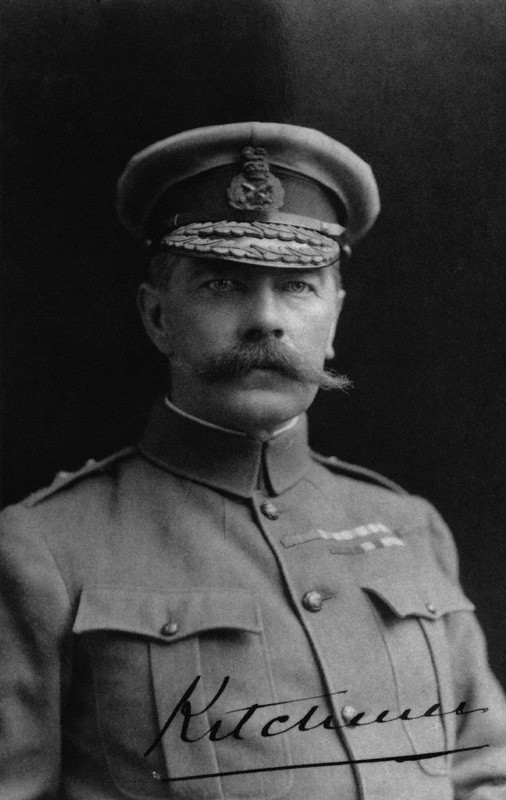
Duffus Bros, platinum print/NPG P403. Horatio Herbert Kitchener, 1st Earl Kitchener of Khartoum, 1901

During the Second Boer War, Kitchener arrived in South Africa with Field Marshal Lord Roberts on the RMS Dunottar Castle along with massive British reinforcements in December 1899. Officially holding the title of chief of staff, he was in practice a second-in-command and was present at the relief of Kimberley before leading an unsuccessful frontal assault at the Battle of Paardeberg in February 1900. Kitchener was mentioned in despatches from Roberts several times during the early part of the war; in a despatch from March 1900 Roberts wrote how he was "greatly indebted to him for his counsel and cordial support on all occasions".

Following the defeat of the conventional Boer forces, Kitchener succeeded Roberts as overall commander in November 1900. He was also promoted to lieutenant-general on 29 November 1900 and to local general on 12 December 1900. He subsequently inherited and expanded the successful strategies devised by Roberts to force the Boer commandos to submit, including concentration camps and the burning of farms. Conditions in the concentration camps, which had been conceived by Roberts as a form of control of the families whose farms he had destroyed, began to degenerate rapidly as the large influx of Boers outstripped the ability of the minuscule British force to cope. The camps lacked space, food, sanitation, medicine, and medical care, leading to rampant disease and a very high death rate for those Boers who entered. Eventually 26,370 women and children (81% were children) died in the concentration camps. The biggest critic of the camps was the English humanitarian and welfare worker Emily Hobhouse. She published a prominent report that highlighted atrocities committed by Kitchener's soldiers and administration, creating considerable debate in London about the war. Kitchener blocked Hobhouse from returning to South Africa by invoking martial law provisions.

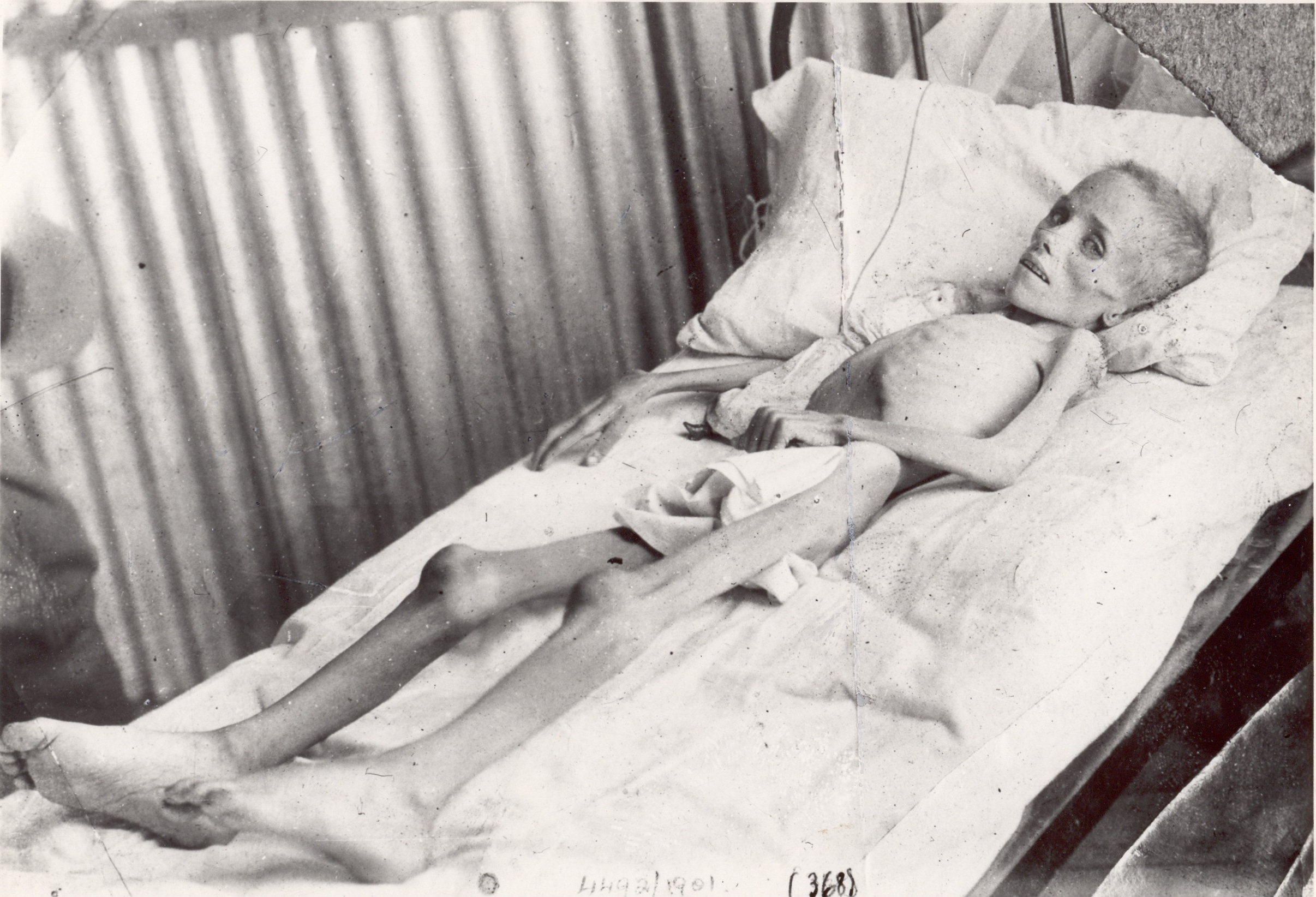
Lizzie van Zyl, a South African girl imprisoned in a concentration camp as a result of Kitchener's counterinsurgency tactics during the Second Boer War

Historian Caroline Elkins characterised Kitchener's conduct of the war as a "scorched earth policy". She wrote that his forces razed homesteads, poisoned wells, implemented concentration camps, and turned women and children into targets in the war.

The Treaty of Vereeniging ending the war was signed in May 1902 following a tense six months. During this period Kitchener struggled against the governor of the Cape Colony (Alfred Milner, 1st Viscount Milner), and against the British government. Milner was a hard-line conservative and wanted to Anglicise the Afrikaans-speaking people (the Boers) by force, and both Milner and the British government wanted to assert victory by forcing the Boers to sign a humiliating peace treaty; Kitchener wanted a more generous compromise peace treaty that would recognise certain rights for the Afrikaners and promise them future self-government. He even entertained a peace treaty proposed by Louis Botha and the other Boer leaders, although he knew the British government would reject the offer; their proposal would have maintained the sovereignty of the South African Republic and the Orange Free State while requiring them to sign a perpetual treaty of alliance with the UK and grant major concessions to the British, such as equal language rights for English with Dutch in their countries, voting rights for Uitlanders, and a customs and railway union with the Cape Colony and the Natal. During Kitchener's posting in South Africa, he became acting High Commissioner for Southern Africa.

Kitchener, who had been promoted to the substantive rank of general on 1 June 1902, was given a farewell reception at Cape Town on 23 June, and left for the United Kingdom in the SS Orotava on the same day. He received an enthusiastic welcome on his arrival the following month. Landing in Southampton on 12 July, he was greeted by the corporation, who presented him with the Freedom of the borough. In London, he was met at the train station by the Prince of Wales, drove in a procession through streets lined by military personnel from 70 different units and watched by thousands of people, and received a formal welcome at St James's Palace. He also visited King Edward VII, who was confined to his room recovering from his recent operation for appendicitis, but wanted to meet the general on his arrival and to personally bestow on him the insignia of the Order of Merit (OM). Kitchener was created Viscount Kitchener, of Khartoum and of the Vaal in the Colony of Transvaal and of Aspall in the County of Suffolk, on 28 July 1902.

=== Court-martial of Breaker Morant ===
In the Breaker Morant case, five Australian officers and one English officer of an irregular unit, the Bushveldt Carbineers, were court-martialled for summarily executing twelve Boer prisoners, and also for the murder of a German missionary believed to be a Boer sympathiser, all allegedly under orders approved by Kitchener. The celebrated horseman and bush poet Lt. Harry "Breaker" Morant and Lt. Peter Handcock were found guilty, sentenced to death, and shot by firing squad at Pietersburg on 27 February 1902. Their death warrants were personally signed by Kitchener. He reprieved a third soldier, Lt. George Witton, who served 32 months before being released.

== India ==
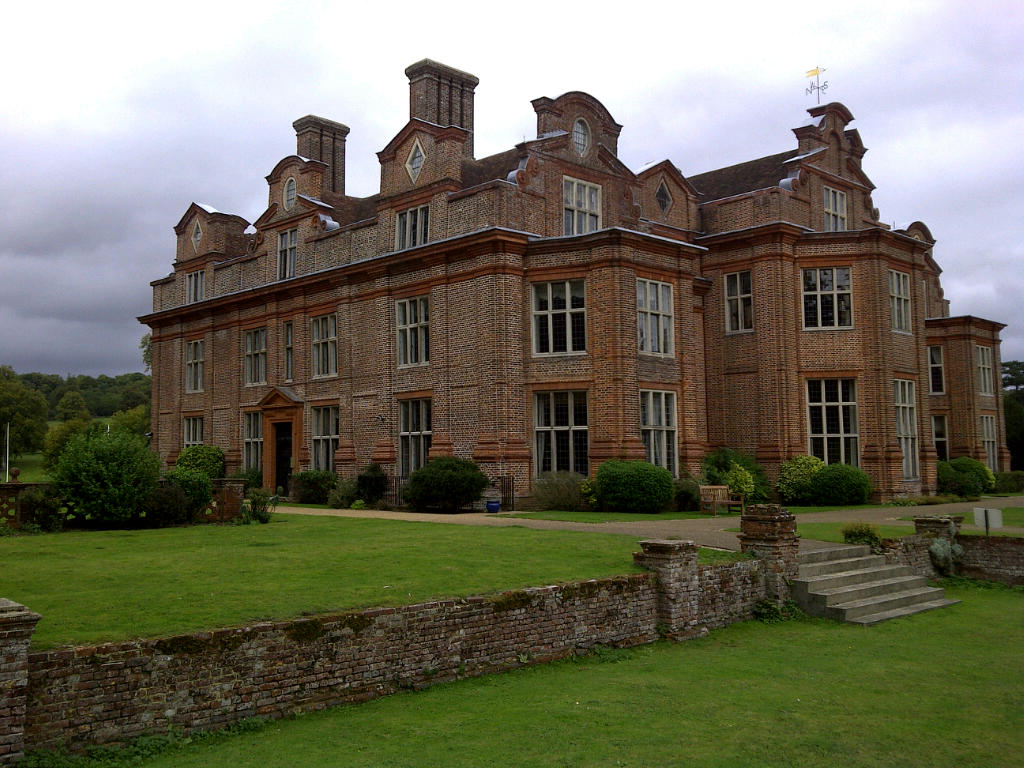
Broome Park, Kitchener's country house in Canterbury, Kent, which he acquired from Sir Percy Dixwell-Oxenden, Bt in 1911

In late 1902 Kitchener was appointed Commander-in-Chief, India, and arrived there to take up the position in November, in time to be in charge during the January 1903 Delhi Durbar. He immediately began the task of reorganising the Indian Army. Kitchener's plan, "The Reorganisation and Redistribution of the Army in India", recommended preparing the Indian Army for any potential war by reducing the size of fixed garrisons and reorganising it into two armies, to be commanded by Generals Sir Bindon Blood and George Luck.

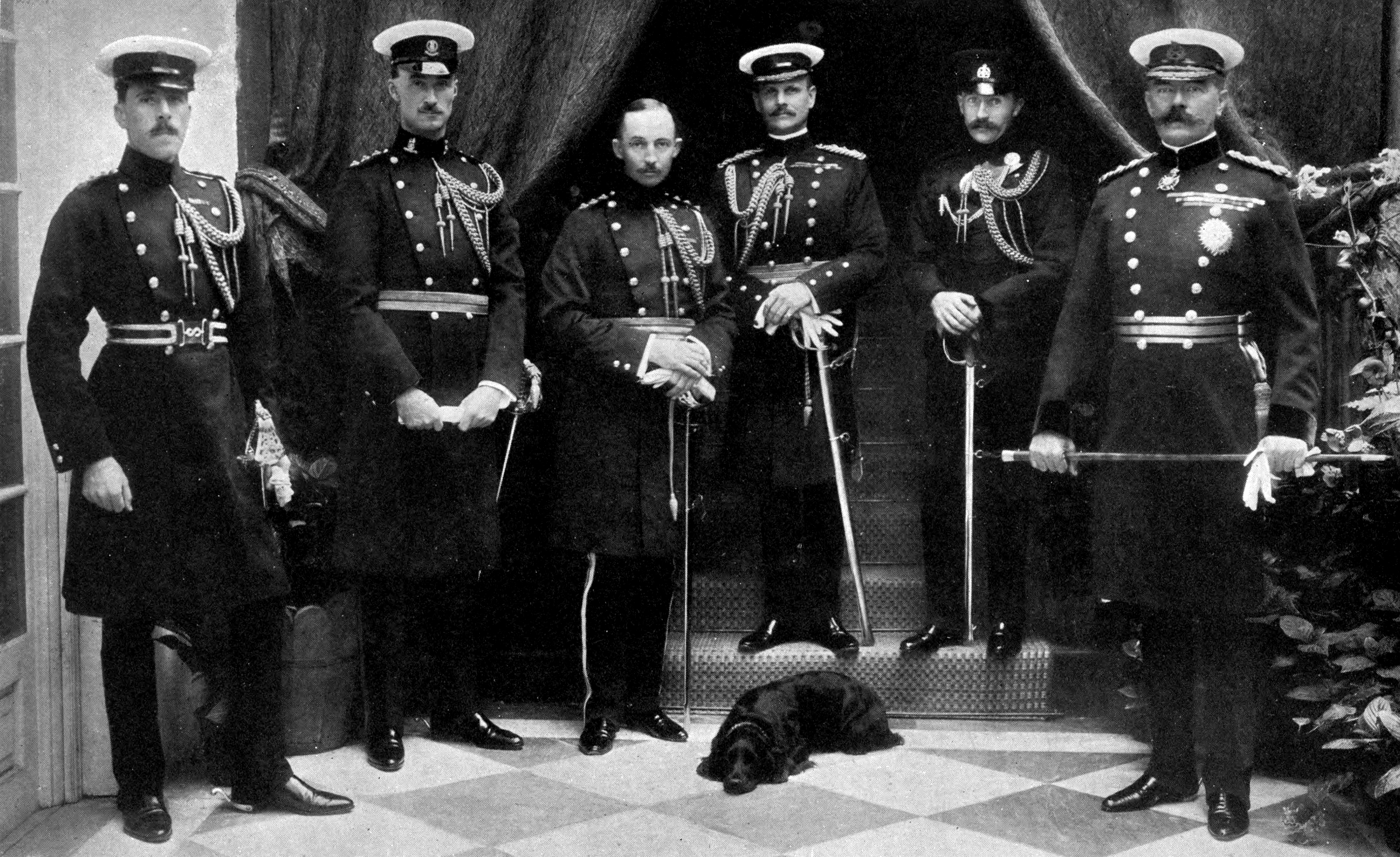
Kitchener and his personal staff in India. From left to right: Lieutenant G. G. E. Wylly; Captain N. J. C. Livingstone-Learmonth; Capt. O. A. G. Fitzgerald; Colonel W. R. Birdwood; Captain W. F. Basset; Lord Kitchener.

While many of the Kitchener Reforms were supported by the viceroy, Lord Curzon of Kedleston, who had originally lobbied for Kitchener's appointment, the two men eventually came into conflict. Curzon wrote to Kitchener advising him that signing himself "Kitchener of Khartoum" took up too much time and space – Kitchener commented on the pettiness of this (Curzon simply signed himself "Curzon" as a hereditary peer, although he later took to signing himself "Curzon of Kedleston"). They also clashed over the question of military administration, as Kitchener objected to the system whereby transport and logistics were controlled by a "Military Member" of the Viceroy's Council. After what Curzon's most recent biographer described as "prolonged intrigue" and "deceitful methods", including correspondence which Kitchener asked the recipients to destroy after reading, the commander-in-chief won the crucial support of the government in London, and the viceroy had no option but to resign.

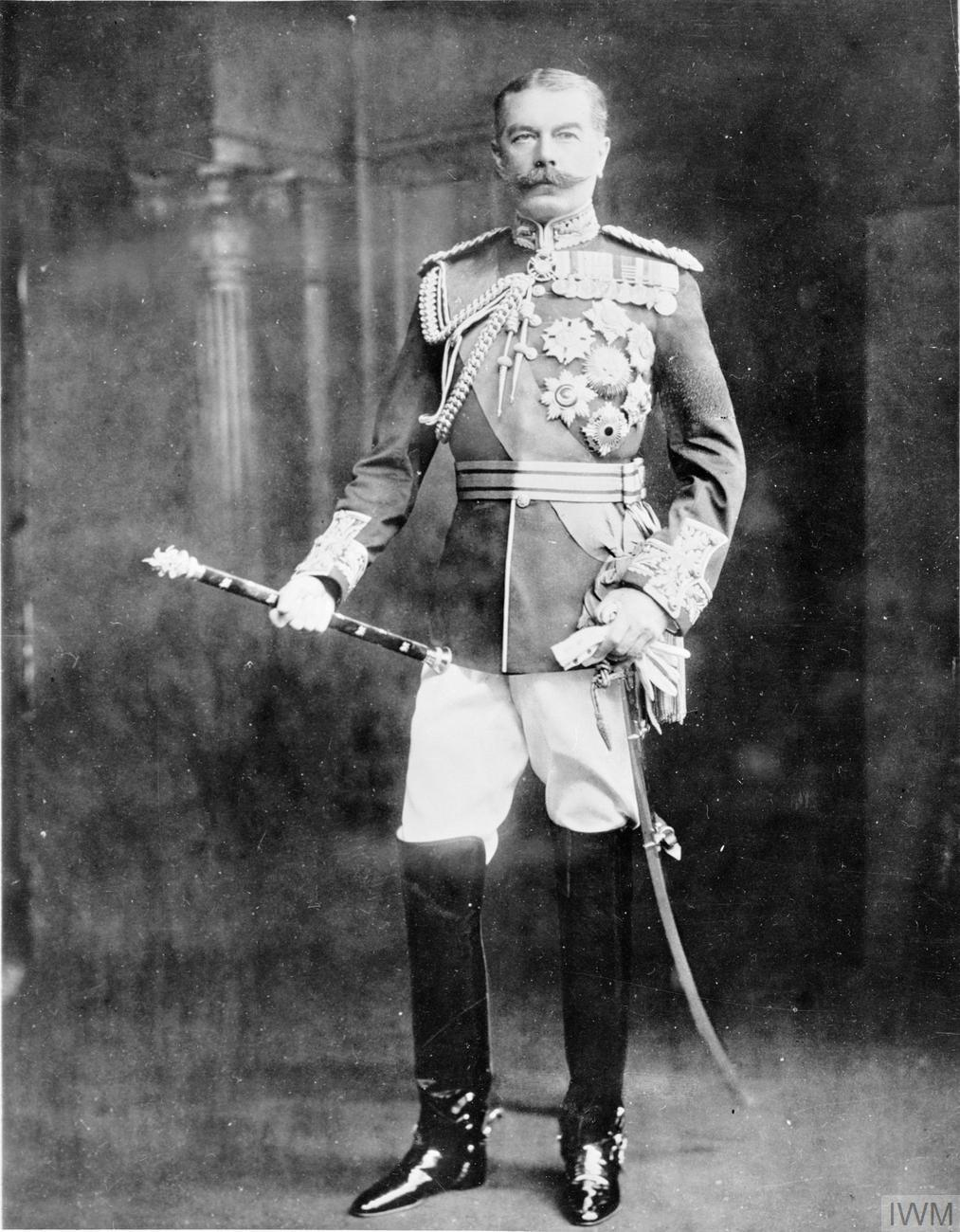
A portrait of Field Marshal Kitchener in full dress uniform taken shortly after being promoted to the rank

Later events proved Curzon was right in opposing Kitchener's attempts to concentrate all military decision-making power in his own office. Although the offices of Commander-in-Chief and Military Member were now held by a single individual, senior officers could approach only the Commander-in-Chief directly. In order to deal with the Military Member, a request had to be made through the Army Secretary, who reported to the Indian Government and had right of access to the Viceroy. There were even instances when the two separate bureaucracies produced different answers to a problem, with the Commander-in-Chief disagreeing with himself as Military Member. This became known as "the canonisation of duality". Kitchener's successor, General Sir Garrett O'Moore Creagh, was nicknamed "no More K", and concentrated on establishing good relations with the viceroy, Lord Hardinge.

Kitchener presided over the Rawalpindi Parade in 1905 to honour the Prince and Princess of Wales's visit to India. That same year Kitchener founded the Indian Staff College at Quetta (now the Pakistan Command and Staff College), where his portrait still hangs. His term of office as commander-in-chief, India, was extended by two years in 1907. In April 1906 he was appointed colonel commandant of the Royal Engineers.

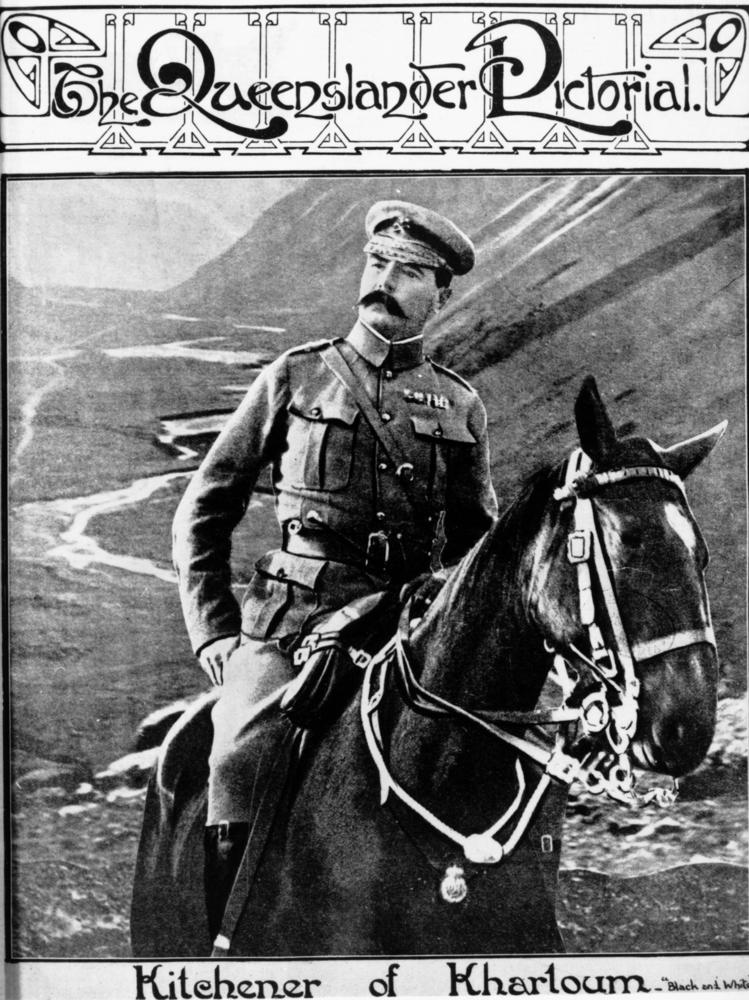
Kitchener on horseback in The Queenslander Pictorial in 1910

Kitchener was promoted to the highest Army rank, field marshal, on 10 September 1909 and went on a tour of Far East (including Japan), Australia and New Zealand. In Japan, Kitchener had an audience with Emperor Meiji and also attended the funeral of Prince Itō Hirobumi.

He aspired to be Viceroy of India, but the secretary of state for India, John Morley, was not keen and hoped to send him instead to Malta as commander-in-chief of British forces in the Mediterranean, even to the point of announcing the appointment in the newspapers. Kitchener pushed hard for the Viceroyalty, returning to London to lobby cabinet ministers and the dying King Edward VII, from whom, whilst collecting his field marshal's baton, Kitchener obtained permission to refuse the Malta job. However, Morley could not be moved. This was perhaps in part because Kitchener was thought to be a Tory (the Liberals were in office at the time); perhaps due to a Curzon-inspired whispering campaign; but most importantly because Morley, who was a Gladstonian and thus suspicious of imperialism, felt it inappropriate, after the recent grant of limited self-government under the Indian Councils Act 1909, for a serving soldier to be viceroy (in the event, no serving soldier was appointed viceroy until Lord Wavell in 1943, during the Second World War). The prime minister, H. H. Asquith, was sympathetic to Kitchener but was unwilling to overrule Morley, who threatened resignation, so Kitchener was finally turned down for the post of Viceroy of India in 1911.

From 22 to 24 June 1911, Kitchener took part in the coronation of King George V and Queen Mary. Kitchener assumed the role of Captain of the Escort, responsible for the personal protection of the royals during the coronation. In this capacity, Kitchener was also the field marshal, In Command of the Troops, and assumed command of the 55,000 British and imperial soldiers present in London. During the Coronation ceremony itself, Kitchener acted as Third Sword, one of the four swords tasked with guarding the monarch. Later, in November 1911, Kitchener hosted the King and Queen in Port Said, Egypt while they were on their way to India for the Delhi Durbar to assume the titles of Emperor and Empress of India.

== Return to Egypt ==
In June 1911, Kitchener then returned to Egypt as British agent and consul-general in Egypt during the formal reign of Abbas Hilmi II as Khedive.

At the time of the Agadir Crisis (summer 1911), Kitchener told the Committee of Imperial Defence that he expected the Germans to walk through the French "like partridges" and he informed Lord Esher "that if they imagined that he was going to command the Army in France he would see them damned first".

He was created Earl Kitchener, of Khartoum and of Broome in the County of Kent, on 29 June 1914.

During this period he became a proponent of Scouting and coined the phrase "once a Scout, always a Scout".

== First World War ==
=== 1914 ===
==== Raising the New Armies ====
The iconic, much-imitated 1914 Lord Kitchener Wants You poster

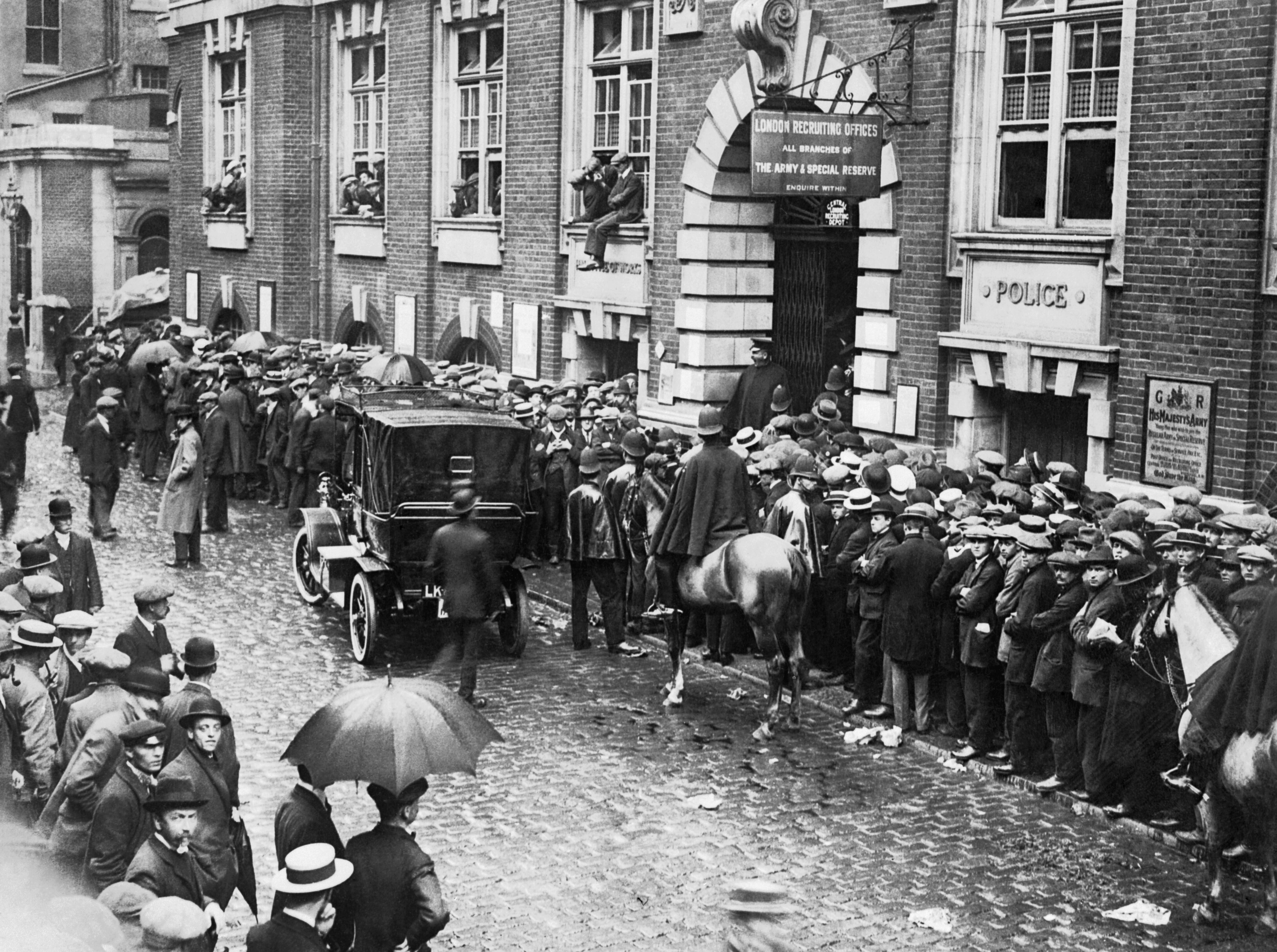
Lines of young men stretching out the doors of the recruiting offices in Whitehall, London, August 1914

At the outset of the First World War, the prime minister, Asquith, quickly had Kitchener appointed secretary of state for war; Asquith had been filling the job himself as a stopgap following the resignation of Colonel Seely over the Curragh Incident earlier in 1914. Kitchener was in Britain on his annual summer leave, between 23 June and 3 August 1914, and had boarded a cross-Channel steamer to commence his return trip to Cairo when he was recalled to London to meet with Asquith. War was declared at 11pm the next day.

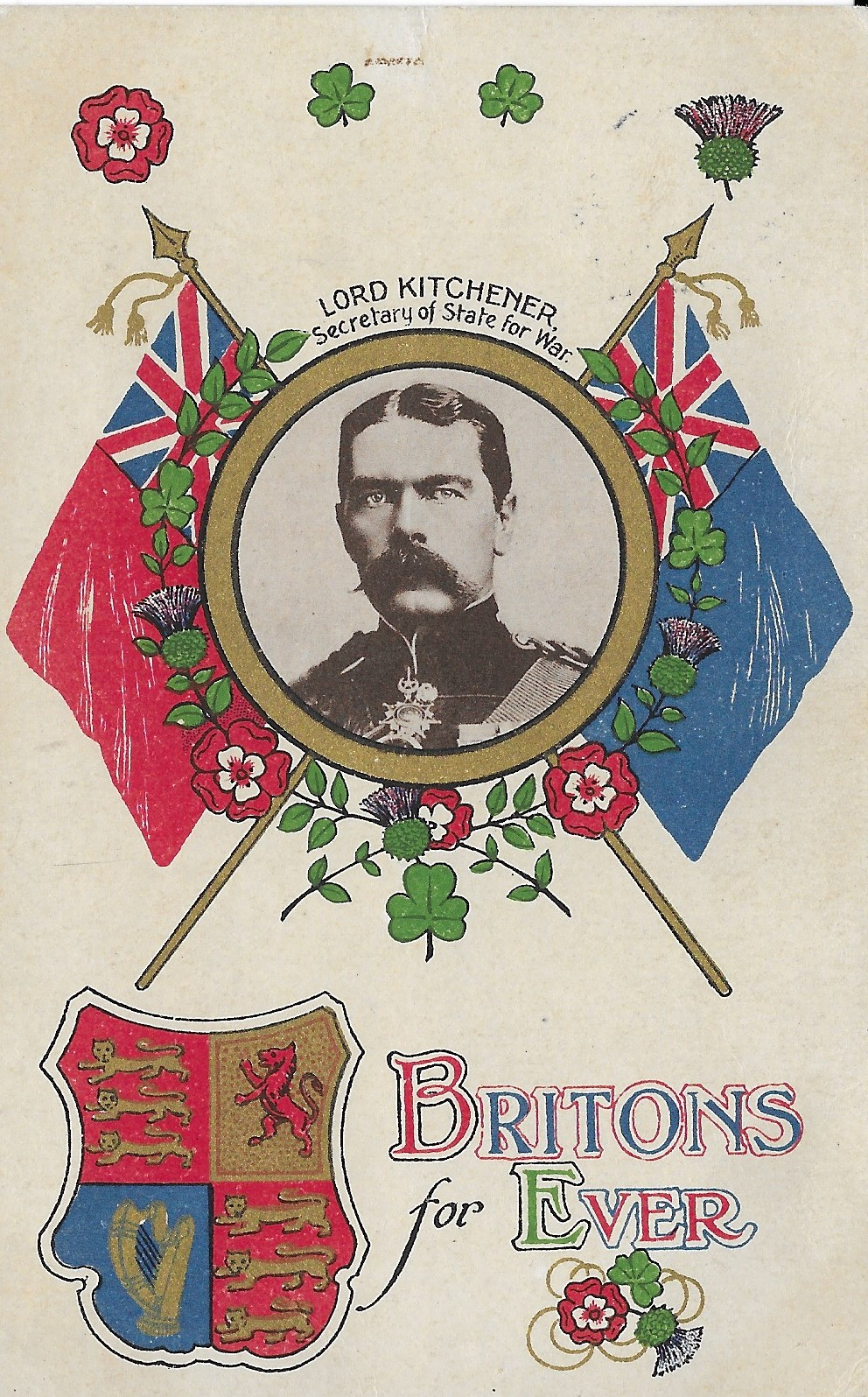
Postcard of Kitchener from WW1 period. The picture shows him as a younger man.

Against cabinet opinion, Kitchener correctly predicted a long war that would last at least three years, require huge new armies to defeat Germany, and cause huge casualties before the end would come. Kitchener stated that the conflict would plumb the depths of manpower "to the last million". A massive recruitment campaign began, which soon featured a distinctive poster of Kitchener, taken from a magazine front cover. It may have encouraged large numbers of volunteers, and has proven to be one of the most enduring images of the war, having been copied and parodied many times since. Kitchener built up the "New Armies" as separate units because he distrusted the Territorials from what he had seen with the French Army in 1870. This may have been a mistaken judgement. The British reservists of 1914 tended to be much younger and fitter than their French equivalents a generation earlier.

Cabinet Secretary Maurice Hankey wrote of Kitchener:

The great outstanding fact is that within eighteen months of the outbreak of the war, when he had found a people reliant on sea-power, and essentially non-military in their outlook, he had conceived and brought into being, completely equipped in every way, a national army capable of holding its own against the armies of the greatest military Power the world had ever seen.

However, Ian Hamilton later wrote of Kitchener "he hated organisations; he smashed organisations ... he was a Master of Expedients".

==== Deploying the BEF ====
At the War Council (5 August) Kitchener and Lieutenant General Sir Douglas Haig argued that the BEF should be deployed at Amiens, where it could deliver a vigorous counterattack once the route of German advance was known. Kitchener argued that the deployment of the BEF in Belgium would result in having to retreat and abandon much of its supplies almost immediately, because the Belgian Army would be unable to hold its ground against the Germans; Kitchener was proved right but, given the belief in fortresses common at the time, it is not surprising that the War Council disagreed with him.

Kitchener, believing Britain should husband its resources for a long war, decided at Cabinet (6 August) that the initial BEF would consist of only 4 infantry divisions (and 1 cavalry), not the 5 or 6 promised. His decision to hold back two of the six divisions of the BEF, although based on exaggerated concerns about German invasion of Britain, arguably saved the BEF from disaster when Sir John French (on the advice of Sir Henry Wilson who was much influenced by the French) might have been tempted to advance further into the teeth of the advancing German forces, had his own force been stronger.

Kitchener's wish to concentrate further back at Amiens may also have been influenced by a largely accurate map of German dispositions which was published by Repington in The Times on the morning of 12 August. Kitchener had a three-hour meeting (12 August) with Sir John French, Archibald Murray, Wilson and the French liaison officer Victor Huguet, before being overruled by the prime minister, who eventually agreed that the BEF should assemble at Maubeuge.

Sir John French's orders from Kitchener were to cooperate with the French but not to take orders from them. Given that the tiny BEF (about 100,000 men, half of them serving regulars and half reservists) was Britain's only field army, Kitchener also instructed French to avoid undue losses and exposure to "forward movements where large numbers of French troops are not engaged" until Kitchener himself had had a chance to discuss the matter with the Cabinet.

==== Meeting with Sir John French ====
The BEF commander in France, Sir John French, concerned by heavy British losses at the Battle of Le Cateau, was considering withdrawing his forces from the Allied line. By 31 August, French commander-in-chief Joseph Joffre, President Raymond Poincaré (relayed via Bertie, the British ambassador) and Kitchener had sent him messages urging him not to do so. Kitchener, authorised by a midnight meeting of whichever cabinet ministers could be found, left for France for a meeting with Sir John on 1 September.

They met, together with René Viviani (French prime minister) and Alexandre Millerand (now French War Minister). Huguet recorded that Kitchener was "calm, balanced, reflective" whilst Sir John was "sour, impetuous, with congested face, sullen and ill-tempered". On Francis Bertie's advice Kitchener dropped his intention of inspecting the BEF. French and Kitchener moved to a separate room, and no independent account of the meeting exists. After the meeting Kitchener telegraphed the Cabinet that the BEF would remain in the line, although taking care not to be outflanked, and told French to consider this "an instruction". French had a friendly exchange of letters with Joffre.

French had been particularly angry that Kitchener had arrived wearing his field marshal's uniform. This was how Kitchener normally dressed at the time (Maurice Hankey thought Kitchener's uniform tactless, but it had probably not occurred to him to change), but French felt that Kitchener was implying that he was his military superior and not simply a cabinet member. By the end of the year French thought that Kitchener had "gone mad" and his hostility had become common knowledge at GHQ and GQG.

=== 1915 ===
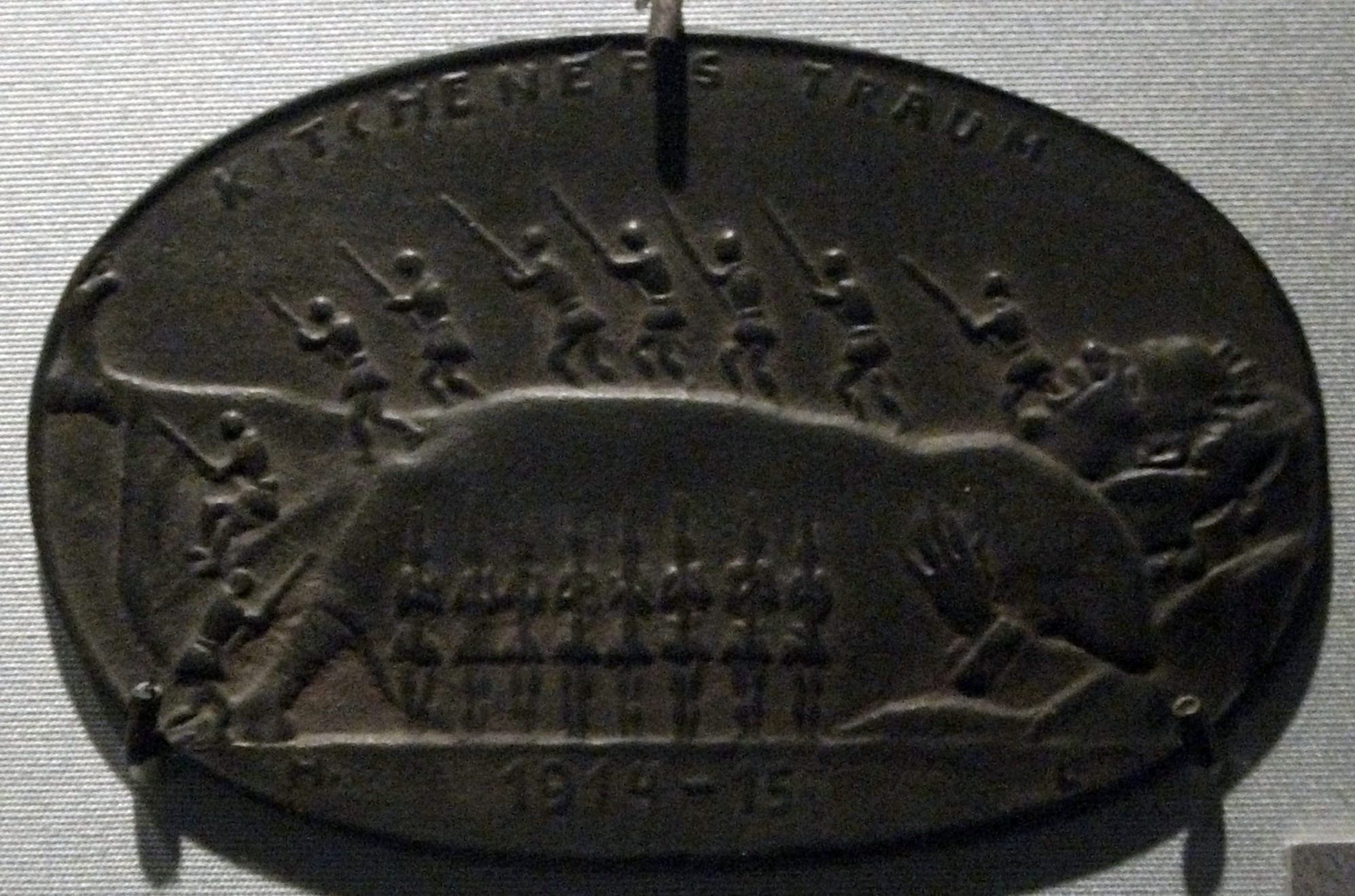
Kitchener's Dream, German propaganda medal, 1915

==== Strategy ====
In January 1915, Field Marshal French, with the concurrence of other senior commanders (e.g. General Sir Douglas Haig), wanted the New Armies incorporated into existing divisions as battalions rather than sent out as entire divisions. French felt (wrongly) that the war would be over by the summer before the New Army divisions were deployed because Germany had recently redeployed some divisions to the east. French took the step of appealing to the prime minister, Asquith, over Kitchener's head, but Asquith refused to overrule Kitchener. This further damaged relations between French and Kitchener, who had travelled to France in September 1914 during the First Battle of the Marne to order French to resume his place in the Allied line.

Kitchener warned French in January 1915 that the Western Front was a siege line that could not be breached, in the context of Cabinet discussions about amphibious landings on the Baltic or North Sea Coast, or against Turkey. In an effort to find a way to relieve pressure on the Western front, Kitchener proposed an invasion of Alexandretta in Turkey with Australian and New Zealand Army Corps (ANZAC), New Army, and Indian troops. Alexandretta was an area with a large Christian population and was the strategic centre of the Ottoman Empire's railway network – its capture would have cut the empire in two. Yet he was instead eventually persuaded to support Winston Churchill's disastrous Gallipoli Campaign in 1915–1916. (Churchill's responsibility for the failure of this campaign is debated; for more information see David Fromkin's A Peace to End All Peace.) As late as mid-October 1915, however, Kitchener told a parliamentary committee that withdrawal from the peninsula would be "the most disastrous event in the history of the empire". The eventual failure, combined with the Shell Crisis of 1915 – amidst press publicity engineered by Sir John French – dealt Kitchener's political reputation a heavy blow; Kitchener was popular with the public, so Asquith retained him in office in the new coalition government, but responsibility for munitions was moved to a new ministry headed by David Lloyd George. He was a sceptic about the tank, which is why it was developed under the auspices of Churchill's Admiralty.

With the Russians being pushed back from Poland, Kitchener thought the transfer of German troops west and a possible invasion of Britain were increasingly likely. He told the War Council (14 May) that he was not willing to send the New Armies overseas. He wired French (16 May 1915) that he would send no more reinforcements to France until he was clear the German line could be broken but sent two divisions at the end of May to please Joffre, not because he thought a breakthrough possible. He had wanted to conserve his New Armies to strike a knockout blow in 1916–17, but by the summer of 1915 realised that high casualties and a major commitment to France were inescapable. "Unfortunately we have to make war as we must, and not as we should like" as he told the Dardanelles Committee on 20 August 1915.

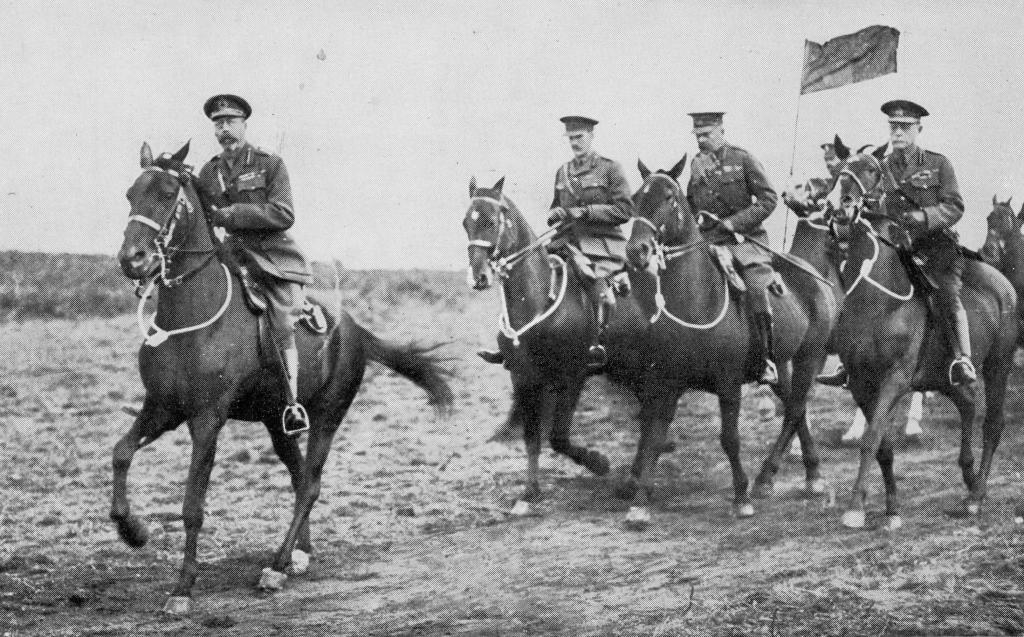
King George V reviews the 36th (Ulster) Division at Aldershot, 30 September 1915. Lord Kitchener rides in the centre of the three riders behind him, with Major General Oliver Nugent, GOC 36th Division, to Kitchener's right.

At an Anglo-French conference at Calais (6 July) Joffre and Kitchener, who was opposed to "too vigorous" offensives, reached a compromise on "local offensives on a vigorous scale", and Kitchener agreed to deploy New Army divisions to France. An inter-Allied conference at Chantilly (7 July, including Russian, Belgian, Serb and Italian delegates) agreed on coordinated offensives. However, Kitchener now came to support the upcoming Loos offensive. He travelled to France for talks with Joffre and Millerand (16 August). The French leaders believed Russia might sue for peace (Warsaw had fallen on 4 August). Kitchener (19 August) ordered the Loos offensive to proceed, despite the attack being on ground not favoured by French or Haig (then commanding First Army). The Official History later admitted that Kitchener hoped to be appointed Supreme Allied Commander. Basil Liddell Hart speculated that this was why he allowed himself to be persuaded by Joffre. New Army divisions first saw action at Loos in September 1915.

==== Reduction in powers ====
Kitchener continued to lose favour with politicians and professional soldiers. He found it "repugnant and unnatural to have to discuss military secrets with a large number of gentlemen with whom he was but barely acquainted". Esher complained that he would either lapse into "obstinacy and silence" or else mull aloud over various difficulties. Alfred Milner told Howell Arthur Gwynne (18 August 1915) that he thought Kitchener a "slippery fish". By autumn 1915, with Asquith's Coalition close to breaking up over conscription, he was blamed for his opposition to that measure (which would eventually be introduced for single men in January 1916) and for the excessive influence which civilians like Churchill and Richard Haldane had come to exert over strategy, allowing ad hoc campaigns to develop in Sinai, Mesopotamia and Salonika. Generals such as Sir William Robertson were critical of Kitchener's failure to ask the Imperial General Staff (whose chief James Wolfe-Murray was intimidated by Kitchener) to study the feasibility of any of these campaigns. These operations were certainly feasible but assumed a level of competence that the British armed forces proved unable to achieve at that time. Tactical incompetence in the Gallipoli campaign meant that even a fairly straightforward task ended in disaster.

Kitchener advised the Dardanelles Committee (21 October) that Baghdad be seized for the sake of prestige then abandoned as logistically untenable. His advice was no longer accepted without question, but the British forces fell short of their objective and were eventually besieged and captured at Kut.

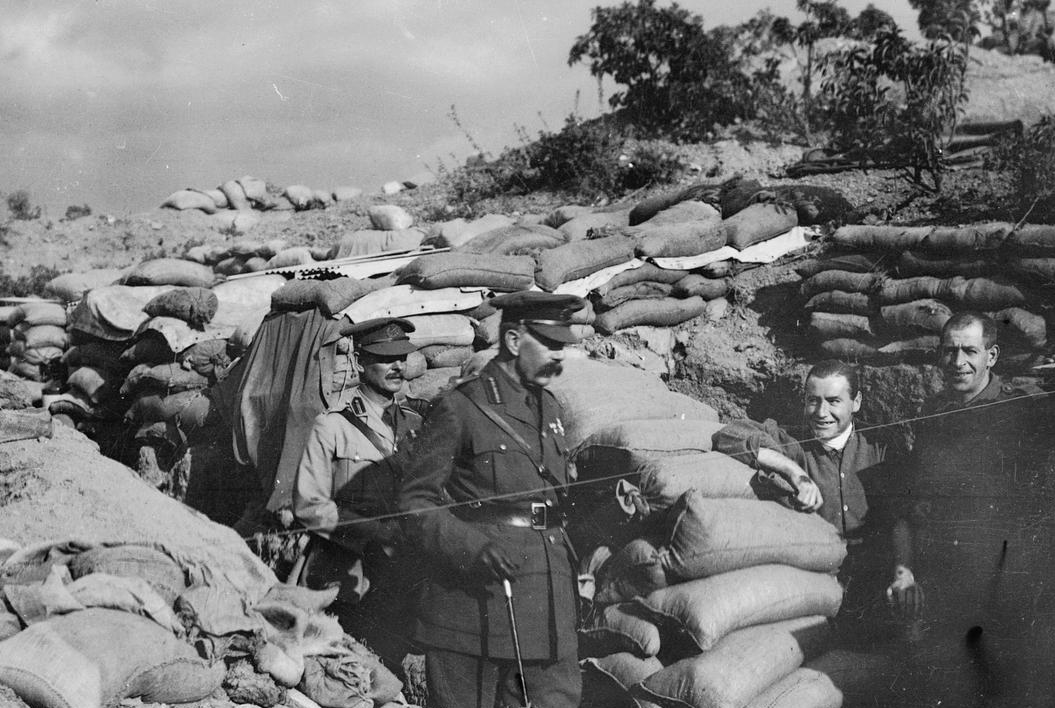
Kitchener with General William Birdwood at Anzac, November 1915

Archibald Murray (Chief of the Imperial General Staff) later recorded that Kitchener was "quite unfit for the position of secretary of state" and "impossible", claiming that he never assembled the Army Council as a body, but instead gave them orders separately, and was usually exhausted by Friday. Kitchener was also keen to break up Territorial units whenever possible while ensuring that "[n]o 'K' Division left the country incomplete". Murray wrote that Kitchener "seldom told the absolute truth and the whole truth" and claimed that it was not until he left on a tour of inspection of Gallipoli and the Near East that Murray was able to inform the Cabinet that volunteering had fallen far below the level needed to maintain a BEF of 70 divisions, requiring the introduction of conscription. The Cabinet insisted on proper General Staff papers being presented in Kitchener's absence.

Asquith, who told Robertson that Kitchener was "an impossible colleague" and "his veracity left much to be desired", hoped that he could be persuaded to remain in the region as commander-in-chief and acted in charge of the War Office, but Kitchener took his seals of office with him so he could not be sacked in his absence. Douglas Haig – at that time involved in intrigues to have Robertson appointed Chief of the Imperial General Staff – recommended that Kitchener be appointed Viceroy of India ("where trouble was brewing") but not to the Middle East, where his strong personality would have led to that sideshow receiving too much attention and resources. Kitchener visited Rome and Athens, but Archibald Murray warned that he would likely demand the diversion of British troops to fight the Turks in the Sinai.

Kitchener and Asquith were agreed that Robertson should become CIGS, but Robertson refused to do this if Kitchener "continued to be his own CIGS", although given Kitchener's great prestige he did not want him to resign; he wanted the secretary of state to be sidelined to an advisory role like the Prussian War Minister. Asquith asked them to negotiate an agreement, which they did over the exchange of several draft documents at the Hotel de Crillon in Paris. Kitchener agreed that Robertson alone should present strategic advice to the Cabinet, with Kitchener responsible for recruiting and supplying the Army, although he refused to agree that military orders should go out over Robertson's signature alone – it was agreed that the secretary of state should continue to sign orders jointly with the CIGS. The agreement was formalised in an Order in Council in January 1916. Robertson was suspicious of efforts in the Balkans and Near East and was instead committed to major British offensives against Germany on the Western Front – the first of these was to be the Somme in 1916.

=== 1916 ===
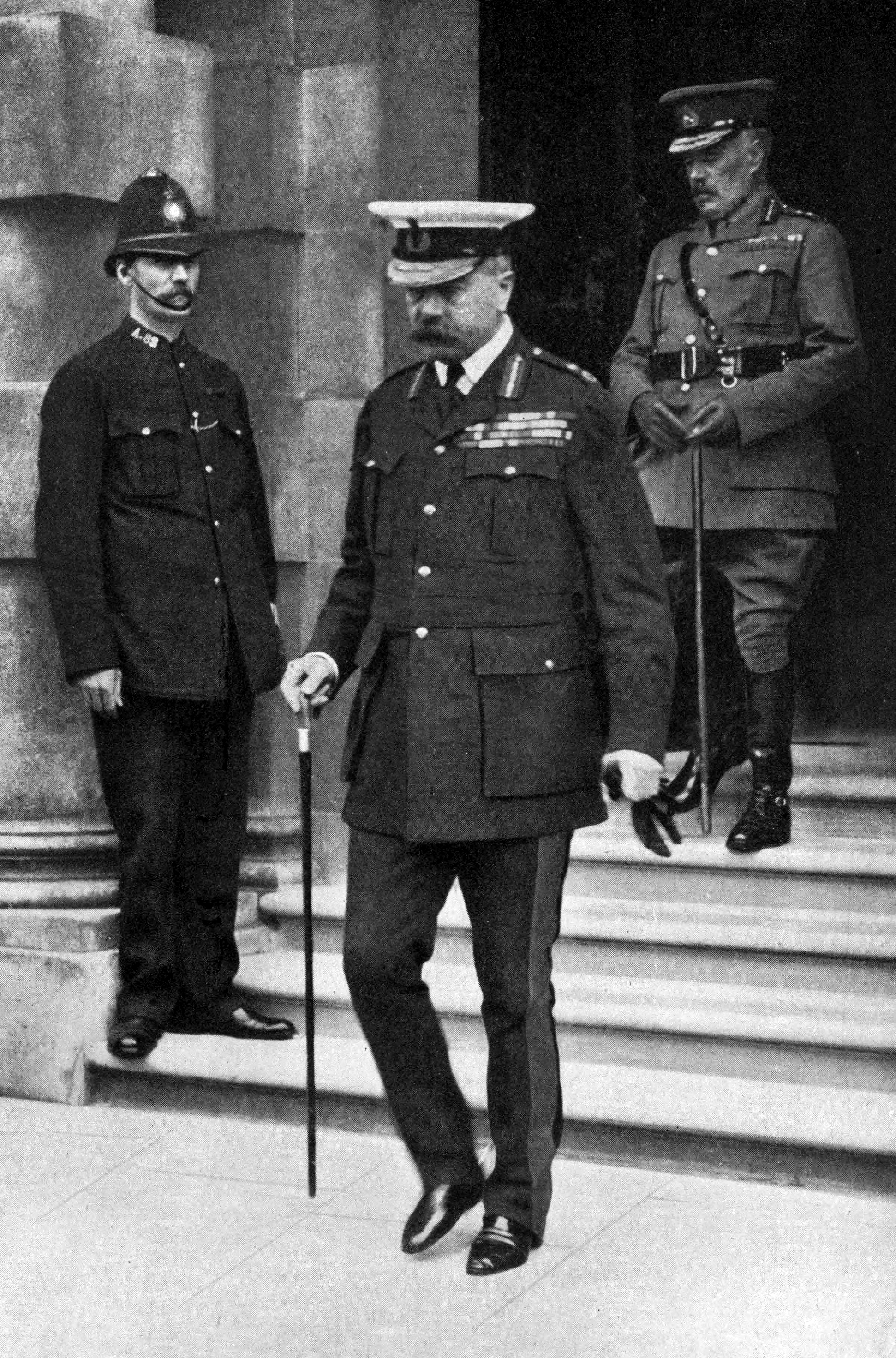
Kitchener leaving the War Office to face his critics. Stood behind him is General Sir William Robertson.

Early in 1916 Kitchener visited Douglas Haig, newly appointed commander-in-chief of the BEF in France. Kitchener had been a key figure in the removal of Haig's predecessor Sir John French, with whom he had a poor relationship. Haig differed with Kitchener over the importance of Mediterranean efforts and wanted to see a strong General Staff in London, but nonetheless valued Kitchener as a military voice against the "folly" of civilians such as Churchill. However, he thought Kitchener "pinched, tired, and much aged", and thought it sad that his mind was "losing its comprehension" as the time for decisive victory on the Western Front (as Haig and Robertson saw it) approached. Kitchener was somewhat doubtful of Haig's plan to win decisive victory in 1916, and would have preferred smaller and purely attritional attacks, but sided with Robertson in telling the Cabinet that the planned Anglo-French offensive on the Somme should go ahead.

By 29 March 1916, Kitchener was under pressure from French prime minister Aristide Briand for the British to attack on the Western Front to help relieve the pressure of the German attack at Verdun. The French refused to bring troops home from Salonika, which Kitchener thought a ploy for the increase of French power in the Mediterranean.

On 2 June 1916, Kitchener personally answered questions asked by politicians about his running of the war effort; at the start of hostilities Kitchener had ordered two million rifles from various US arms manufacturers. Only 480 of these rifles had arrived in the UK by 4 June 1916. The number of shells supplied was no less paltry. Kitchener explained the efforts he had made to secure alternative supplies. He received a resounding vote of thanks from the 200 Members of Parliament (MPs) who had arrived to question him, both for his candour and for his efforts to keep the troops armed; Sir Ivor Herbert, who, a week before, had introduced the failed vote of censure in the House of Commons against Kitchener's running of the War Office, personally seconded the motion.

== Death ==
=== Russian mission ===
In the midst of his other political and military concerns, Kitchener had devoted personal attention to the deteriorating situation on the Eastern Front. This included the provision of extensive stocks of war material for the Imperial Russian Army, which had been under increasing pressure since mid-1915. In May 1916, the chancellor of the exchequer Reginald McKenna suggested that Kitchener head a special and confidential mission to Russia to discuss munition shortages, military strategy and financial difficulties with the Imperial Russian Government and the Stavka (military high command), which was now under the personal command of Tsar Nicholas II. Both Kitchener and the Russians were in favour of face to face talks, and a formal invitation from the Tsar was received on 14 May. Kitchener left London by train for Scotland on the evening of 4 June with a party of officials, military aides and personal servants.

=== Lost at sea ===
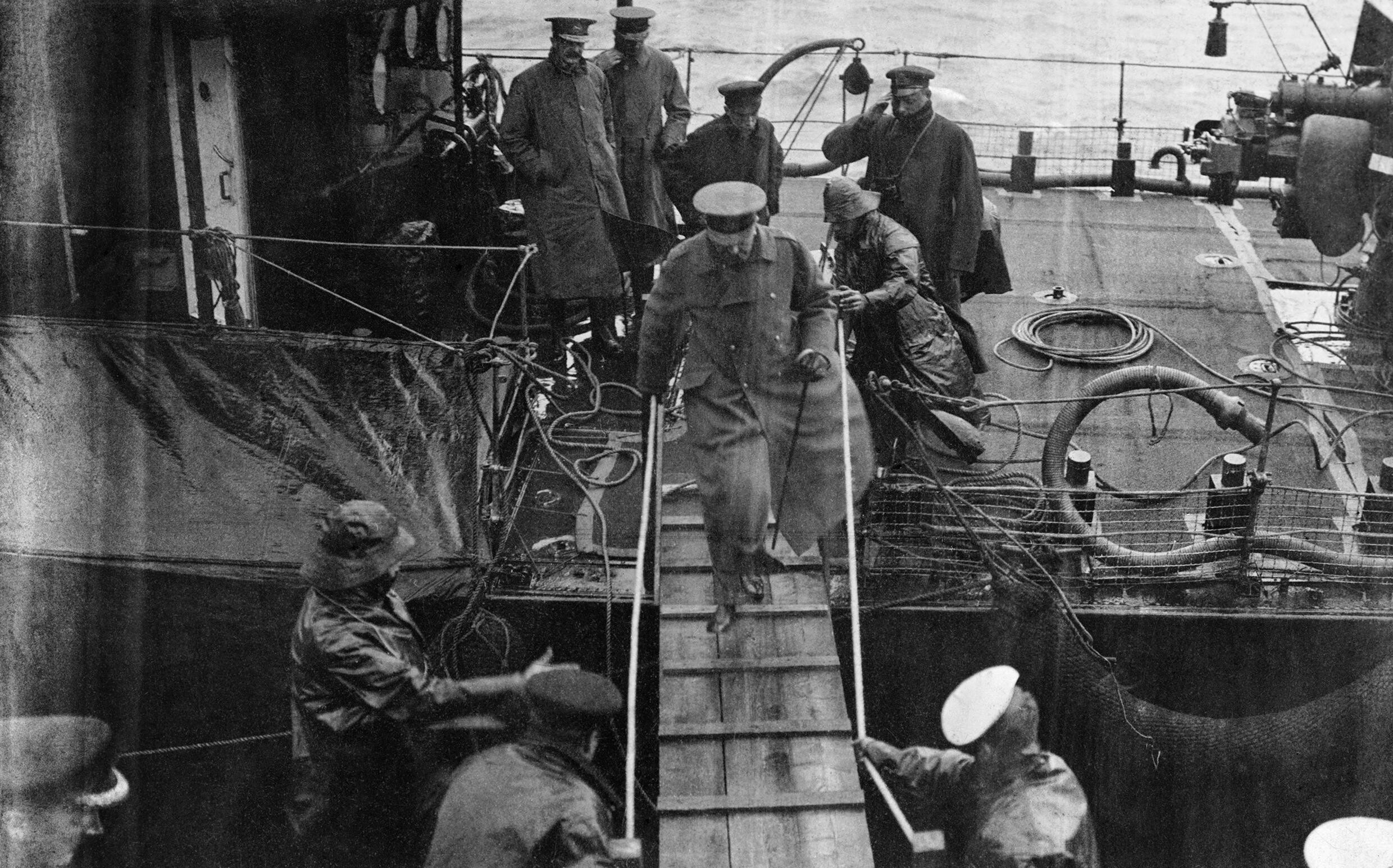
One of the last photographs taken of Kitchener. He is boarding HMS Iron Duke from HMS Oak at Scapa Flow, to confer with Admiral Jellicoe, 5 June 1916

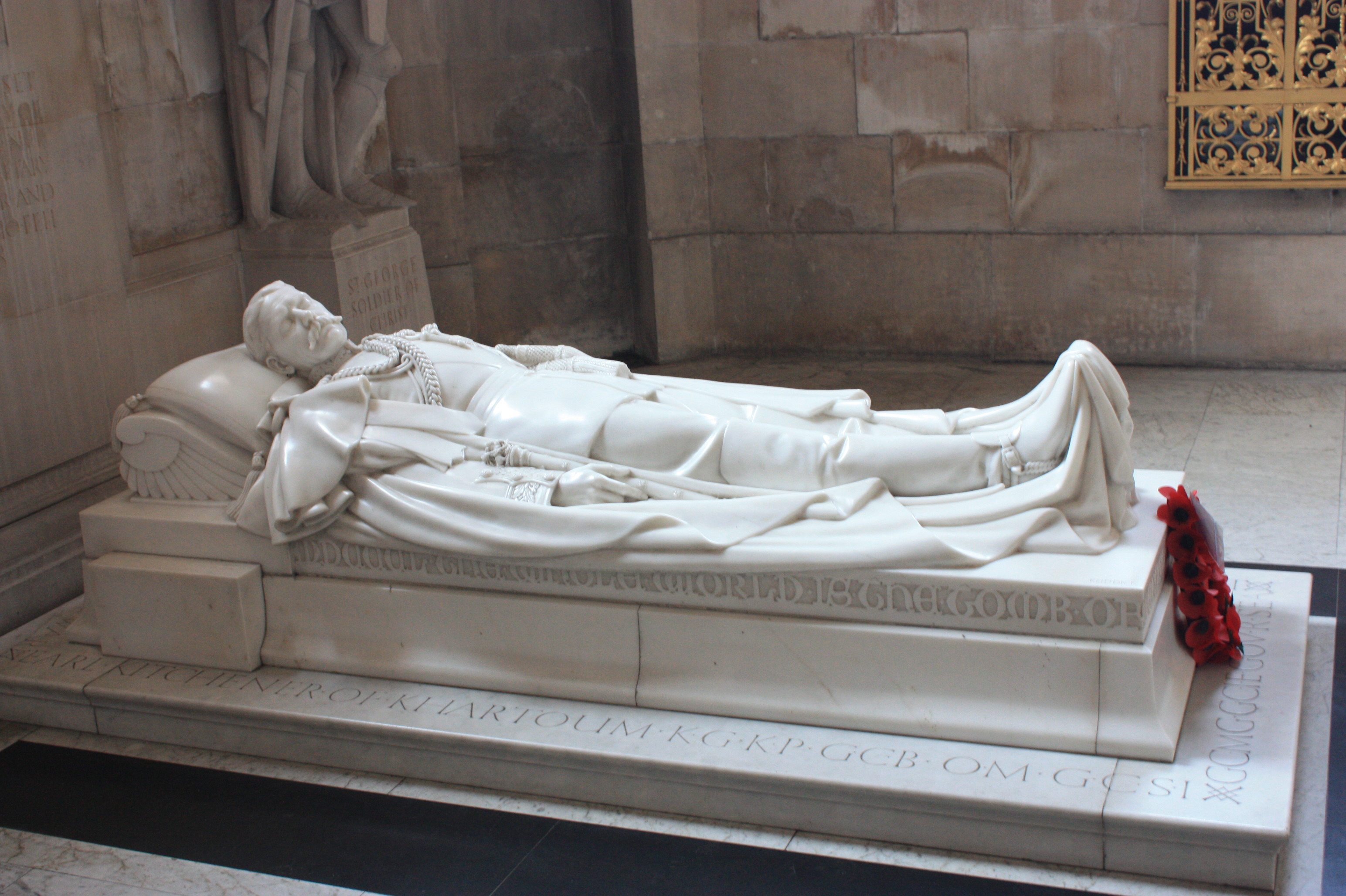
Kitchener's memorial, St Paul's Cathedral, London

Kitchener sailed from Scrabster to Scapa Flow on 5 June 1916 aboard HMS Oak. He had lunch with Admiral Sir John Jellicoe, commander-in-chief of the Grand Fleet, on board his flagship HMS Iron Duke; Kitchener was keen to discuss the recent Battle of Jutland and stated that he was looking forward to his three-week diplomatic mission to Russia as a break from domestic pressures. He then set out for Russia on board the armoured cruiser HMS Hampshire. At the last minute Jellicoe changed Hampshire's route on the basis of a mis-reading of the weather forecast and ignoring (or not being aware of) recent intelligence and sightings of German U-boat activity in the vicinity of the amended route.

Shortly before 7:30 pm that same day, while steaming for the Russian port of Arkhangelsk during a force 9 gale, Hampshire struck a mine laid by the newly launched German U-boat U-75 (commanded by Kurt Beitzen) and sank west of the Orkney Islands. Recent research has set the death toll of those aboard Hampshire at 737. Only twelve men survived. Among the dead were all ten members of Kitchener's entourage. Kitchener himself was seen standing on the quarterdeck during the approximately twenty minutes that it took the ship to sink. His body was never recovered.

The news of Kitchener's death was received with shock throughout the British Empire. A man in Yorkshire committed suicide at learning the news; a sergeant on the Western Front was heard to exclaim "Now we've lost the war. Now we've lost the war"; and a nurse wrote home to her family that she knew Britain would win as long as Kitchener lived, and now that he was gone: "How awful it is – a far worse blow than many German victories. So long as he was with us we knew even if things were gloomy that his guiding hand was at the helm."

General Douglas Haig commanding the British Armies on the Western Front remarked on first receiving the news of Kitchener's death via a German radio signal intercepted by the British Army, "How shall we get on without him". King George V wrote in his diary: "It is indeed a heavy blow to me and a great loss to the nation and the allies." He ordered army officers to wear black armbands for a week.

C. P. Scott, editor of The Manchester Guardian, is said to have remarked that "as for the old man, he could not have done better than to have gone down, as he was a great impediment lately". (Note: Originally quoted from Vera Weizmann Diaries, 13 July 1916 in her memoirs The Impossible Takes Longer as told to David Tutaev (New York, 1967), pg. 63.)

=== Conspiracy theories ===
Kitchener's great fame, the suddenness of his death, and its apparently convenient timing for a number of parties gave almost immediate rise to a number of conspiracy theories about his death. One in particular was posited by Lord Alfred Douglas (of Oscar Wilde fame), suggesting a connection between Kitchener's death, the recent naval Battle of Jutland, Winston Churchill, and a Jewish conspiracy. Churchill successfully sued Douglas in what proved to be the last successful case of criminal libel in British legal history, and the latter spent six months in prison. Another claimed that Hampshire did not strike a mine at all, but was sunk by explosives secreted in the vessel by Irish republicans.

General Erich Ludendorff, Generalquartiermeister and joint head (with Paul von Hindenburg) of Germany's war effort stated in the 1920s that Russian anti-Tsarists had betrayed the plan to visit the Russians to the German command:

His mysterious death was the work neither of a German mine nor a German torpedo, but of the power which would not permit the Russian Army to recover with the help of Lord Kitchener because the destruction of Czarist Russia had been determined upon. Lord Kitchener's death was caused by his ability.

In 1926, a hoaxer named Frank Power claimed in the Sunday Referee newspaper that Kitchener's body had been found by a Norwegian fisherman. Power brought a coffin back from Norway and prepared it for burial in St Paul's Cathedral. At this point, however, the authorities intervened, and the coffin was opened in the presence of police and a distinguished pathologist. The box was found to contain only tar for weight. There was widespread public outrage at Power, but he was never prosecuted.

Fritz Duquesne, a Boer soldier and spy, claimed he had assassinated Kitchener after an earlier attempt to kill him in Cape Town failed. He was arrested and court-martialled in Cape Town and sent to the penal colony of Bermuda but managed to escape to the United States. MI5 confirmed that Duquesne was "a German intelligence officer ... involved in a series of acts of sabotage against British shipping in South American waters during the [First World] war"; he was wanted for: "murder on the high seas, the sinking and burning of British ships, the burning of military stores, warehouses, coaling stations, conspiracy, and the falsification of Admiralty documents".

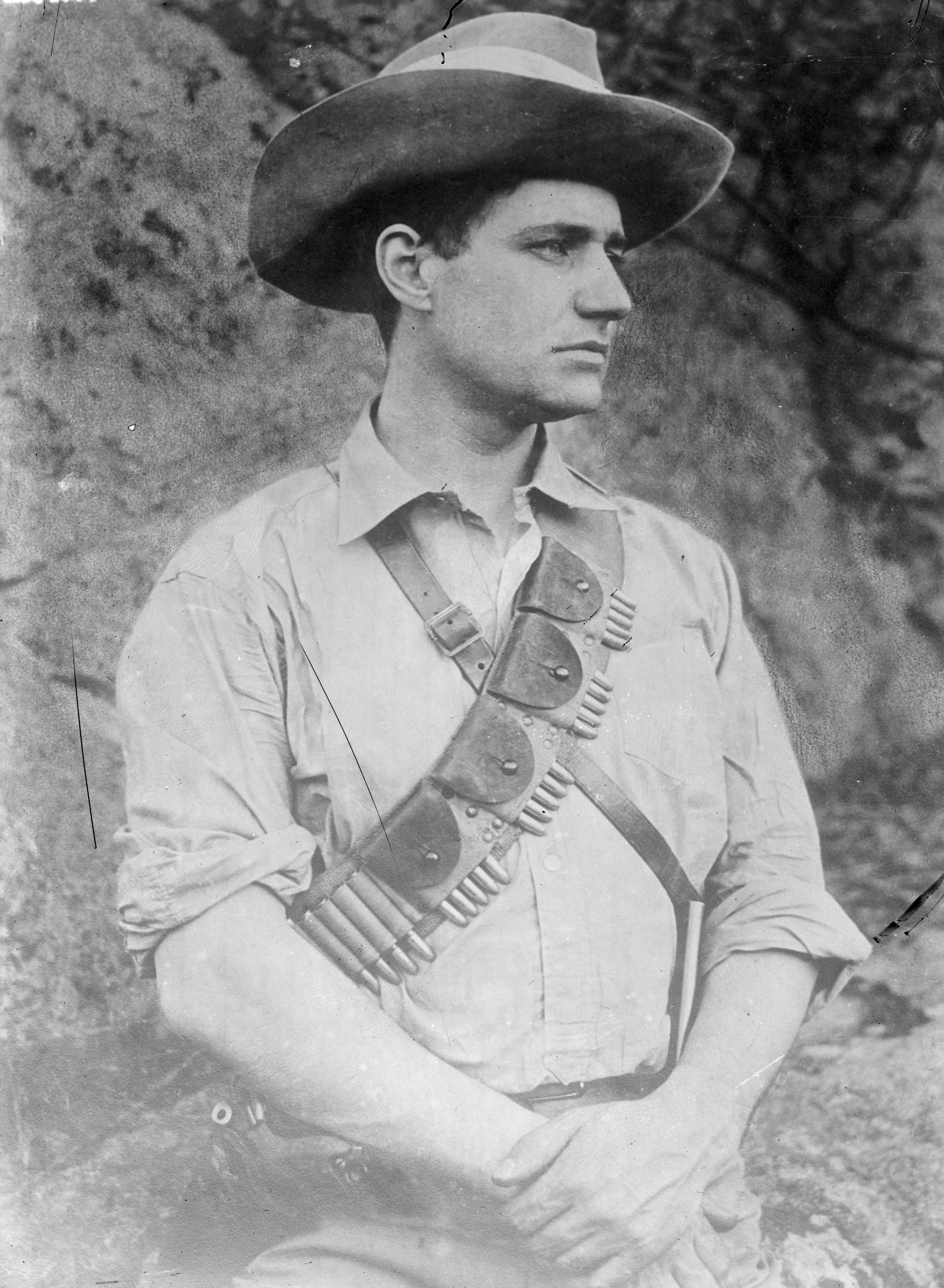
Photo of Fritz Duquesne in the Boer War

Duquesne's unverified story was that he returned to Europe, posed as the Russian Duke Boris Zakrevsky in 1916, and joined Kitchener in Scotland. While on board HMS Hampshire with Kitchener, Duquesne claimed to have signalled a German submarine that then sank the cruiser, and was rescued by the submarine, later being awarded the Iron Cross for his efforts. Duquesne was later apprehended and tried by the authorities in the U.S. for insurance fraud, but managed to escape again. However, there are "numerous improbabilities", in Duquesne's story, and "no records" to corroborate any part of it.

During the Second World War, Duquesne ran a German spy ring in the United States until he was caught by the FBI in what became the biggest roundup of spies in U.S. history: the Duquesne Spy Ring.

Coincidentally, Kitchener's brother died in office in Bermuda in 1912, and his nephew, Major H. H. "Hap" Kitchener, who had married a Bermudan, purchased (with a legacy left to him by his uncle) Hinson's Island – part of the former prisoner of war camp from which Duquesne had escaped – after the First World War as the location of his home and business.

== Legacy ==
Kitchener is officially remembered in a chapel on the northwest corner of St Paul's Cathedral in London, near the main entrance, where a memorial service was held in his honour.

In Canada, the city of Berlin, Ontario, named in respect to a large German immigrant settler population, was renamed Kitchener following a 1916 referendum.

Since 1970, the opening of new records has led historians to rehabilitate Kitchener's reputation to some extent. Robin Neillands, for instance, notes that Kitchener consistently rose in ability as he was promoted. Some historians now praise his strategic vision in the First World War, especially his laying the groundwork for the expansion of munitions production and his central role in the raising of the British army in 1914 and 1915, providing a force capable of meeting Britain's continental commitment.

His commanding image, appearing on recruiting posters demanding "Your country needs you!", remains recognised and parodied in popular culture. In the 1972 movie Young Winston, Kitchener is portrayed by John Mills. In the 2021 movie The King's Man, Kitchener is portrayed by Charles Dance.

Kitchener figures significantly in Lucy Maud Montgomery's 1921 novel Rilla of Ingleside, the eighth book in the Anne of Green Gables series. The titular character, Rilla Blythe, takes in an abandoned infant whom she names James Kitchener Anderson. His middle name is chosen at the behest of Susan, her family's housekeeper, who is an ardent follower of Kitchener and refuses to call the child anything but "Little Kitchener".

== Memorials ==
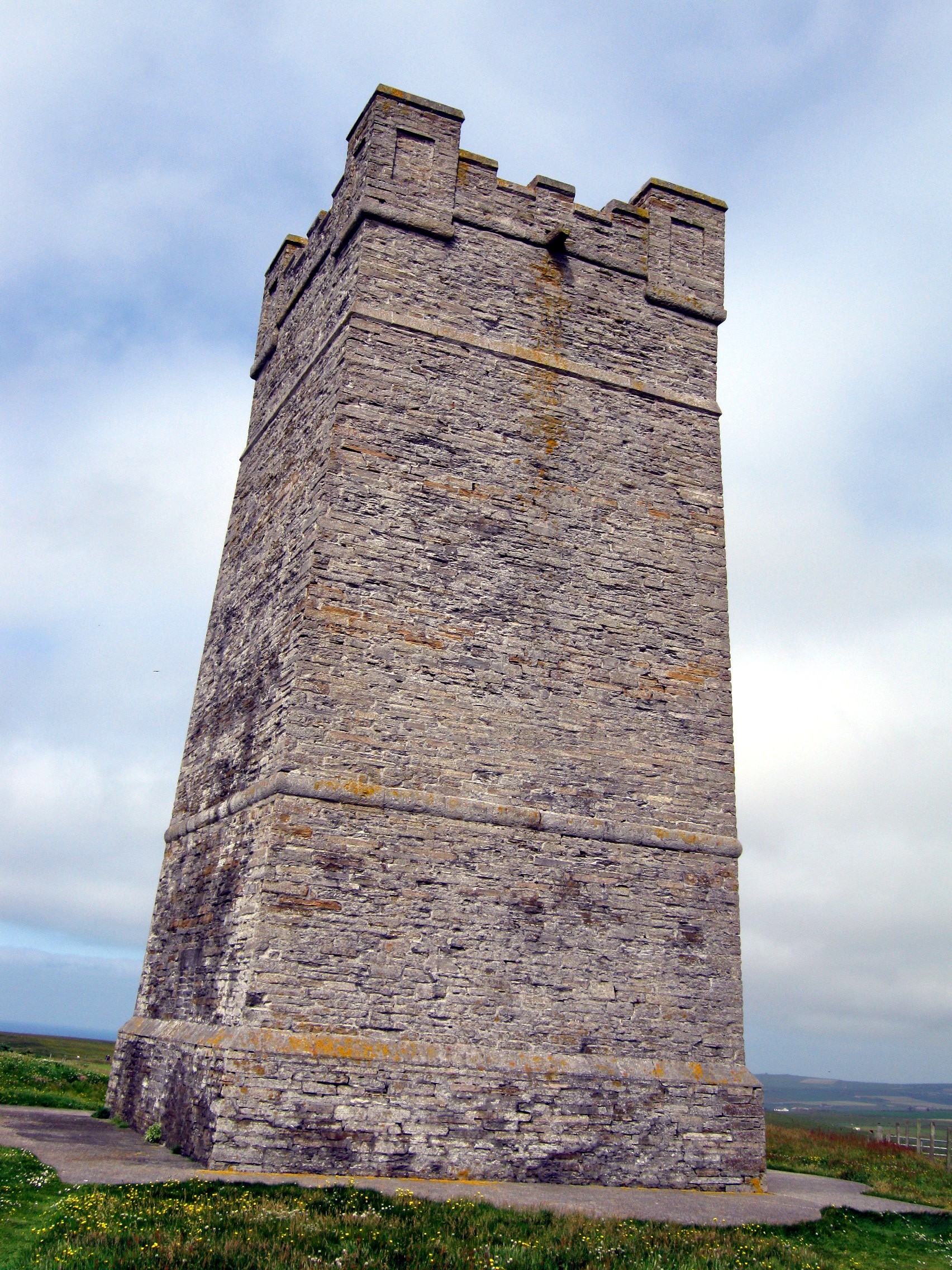
Kitchener Memorial at Marwick Head on Mainland, Orkney

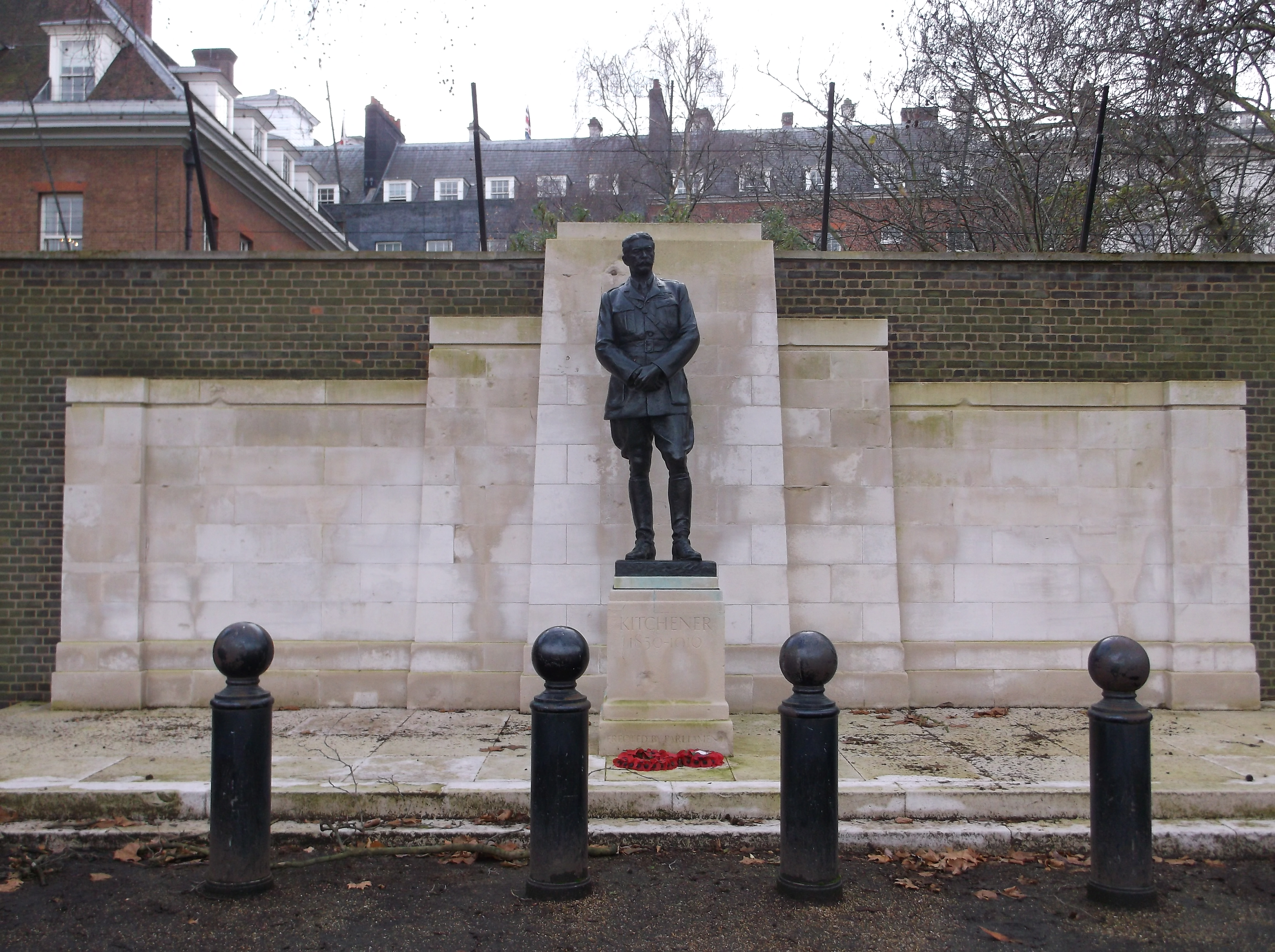
Kitchener Memorial on Horseguards Parade

- As a British Army officer who was lost at sea in the First World War and has no known grave, Kitchener has his name commemorated on the Commonwealth War Graves Commission's Hollybrook Memorial at Hollybrook Cemetery, located at Southampton, Hampshire.
- Blue plaques have been erected to mark where Kitchener lived in Carlton Gardens, Westminster and at Broome Park near Canterbury.
- The NW chapel of All Souls at St Paul's Cathedral, London, re-dedicated as the Kitchener Memorial in 1925, though normally closed to visitors, remains clearly visible from the main entrance lobby. The recumbent white-marble figure was designed by Detmar Blow. The figure, plus the statues of Saint George and Saint Michael and the Pieta in the chapel were sculpted by William Reid Dick.
- A month after Kitchener's death the Lord Mayor of London established the Lord Kitchener National Memorial Fund to honour his memory. The Fund aided casualties of the war, both practically and financially; following the war's end it enabled university educations for soldiers, ex-soldiers, and their sons and daughters, a function it continues to perform. A Memorial Book of tributes and remembrances from Kitchener's peers, edited by Sir Hedley Le Bas, was printed to benefit the fund.
- The Lord Kitchener Memorial Homes in Chatham, Kent, were built with funds from public subscription following Kitchener's death. A small terrace of cottages, they are used to provide affordable rented accommodation for servicemen and women who have seen active service or for their widows and widowers.
- A statue of Kitchener mounted on his favourite charger, Democrat, stands on Khartoum Road (near Fort Amherst) in Chatham, Kent. Erected in Khartoum in 1920, it was moved to the UK in 1959 after Sudan became independent in 1956. It was unveiled at this site by the secretary of state for war, Christopher Soames. The statue was designed by the Hull-born sculptor Sydney March.
- The Kitchener Memorial on Mainland, Orkney, stands on the cliff edge at Marwick Head (HY2325), near the spot where Kitchener died at sea. It is a square, crenellated stone tower with the inscription: "This tower was raised by the people of Orkney in memory of Field Marshal Earl Kitchener of Khartoum on that corner of his country which he had served so faithfully nearest to the place where he died on duty. He and his staff perished along with the officers and nearly all the men of HMS Hampshire on 5 June 1916."
- In the early 1920s, a road on a new council estate in the Kates Hill area of Dudley, Worcestershire (now West Midlands) was named Kitchener Road in honour of Kitchener.
- The east window of the chancel at St George's Church, Eastergate, West Sussex has stained glass commemorating Kitchener.
- In December 2013 the Royal Mint announced plans to mint commemorative two-pound coins in 2014 featuring Kitchener's "Call to Arms" on the reverse.
- A memorial cross for Kitchener was unveiled at St Botolph-without-Bishopsgate church in 1916 (near Liverpool Street station), perhaps one of the first memorials of the First World War in England.
- One of the three houses of the Rashtriya Indian Military College, Dehradun, India was named after Kitchener.
- A memorial tree was dedicated to Kitchener a month after his death along the Avenue of Honour in the former town of Eurack, Victoria and remains today while the surrounding township no longer exists.
- Half-a-dozen local communities inscribed Kitchener's name onto the memorials they were already building to their own dead, alongside the names of ordinary soldiers and sailors who had answered his 1914 appeal for volunteers and would never return.
- Alexander Dickson II bred the "Kitchener of Khartoum" or "K. of K." medium-red hybrid tea rose in 1917.
- After a court decision, Kitchener's house, Wildflower Hall in Shimla, India, came into the possession of the Government of Himachal Pradesh in November 2023. An appeal by the hotel-owner was rejected in February 2024. Kitchener had the house built in 1902. In 1925 the original house was demolished and in 2001 replaced by a hotel owned by the Oberoi Group.

== Debate on Kitchener's sexuality ==
Kitchener was a lifelong bachelor. From his time in Egypt in 1892, he gathered around him a cadre of eager young and unmarried officers nicknamed "Kitchener's band of boys". These included Captain Oswald Fitzgerald, his aide-de-camp and "constant and inseparable companion", who died with him on their voyage to Russia. Rumour sometimes circulated that Kitchener was homosexual. Egyptian campaign and Boer War veteran Major A. E. Wearne, who was a strong critic of Kitchener, stated in 1909 that he had the "failing acquired by most of the Egyptian officers, a taste for buggery".

In 2001, it was revealed that Lady Astor's son told David Somerset, 11th Duke of Beaufort that Kitchener had been his first seducer. An elderly source told an identical story to historian Peter King, while several other sources, including Lady Diana Cooper, stated similar.

Since Kitchener's death a number of biographers have suggested or hinted that he was latent or active homosexual. Later scholars who made the case for his homosexuality include H. Montgomery Hyde, Ronald Hyam (who commented on his avoidance of interviews with women, his keen interest in the Boy Scout movement, and his decorating his rose garden with four pairs of sculptured bronze boys. According to Hyam, "there is no evidence that he ever loved a woman"), Denis Judd and Frank Richardson. Philip Magnus hints at homosexuality, though Lady Winifred Renshaw said that Magnus later said "I know I've got the man wrong, too many people have told me so."

More recently biographer C. Brad Faught acknowledged Kitchener's "vestigial femininity" in collecting porcelain and organising dinner parties, plus emotional repression typical of his class and time, but concluded that the absence of evidence either way leaves "an issue about which historians can say almost nothing useful", while biographer George H. Cassar argued that Kitchener's letters to his sister include evidence of heterosexual attraction and that if there were any credible evidence that Kitchener was homosexual, it would have been used by his many opponents during his lifetime.

== Honours and arms ==
=== Orders ===
Kitchener received numerous campaign and commemorative decorations from the British government, as well as several medals from allied nations. His other decorations included:

British

- Knight Companion of the Order of the Garter (KG) – 3 June 1915
- Knight of the Order of St Patrick (KP) – 19 June 1911
- Knight Grand Cross of the Order of the Bath (GCB) – 15 November 1898 (KCB – 17 November 1896; CB – 8 November 1889)
- Member of the Order of Merit (OM) – 12 July 1902
- Knight Grand Commander of the Order of the Star of India (GCSI) – 25 June 1909
- Knight Grand Cross of the Order of St Michael and St George (GCMG) – 29 November 1900 (KCMG – 12 February 1894; CMG – 6 August 1886)
- Knight Grand Commander of the Order of the Indian Empire (GCIE) – 1 January 1908

Foreign

- Order of Osmanieh, Ottoman Empire first class – 7 December 1896 (second class – 30 April 1894; third class – 11 June 1885)
- Order of the Medjidie, Ottoman Empire first class – 18 November 1893 (second class – 18 June 1888)
- Grand Cordon with Paulownia Flowers of the Order of the Rising Sun, Empire of Japan – 11 November 1909
- Order of Karađorđe's Star with swords, Kingdom of Serbia – 1918

=== Medal Bar (as worn at time of death) ===

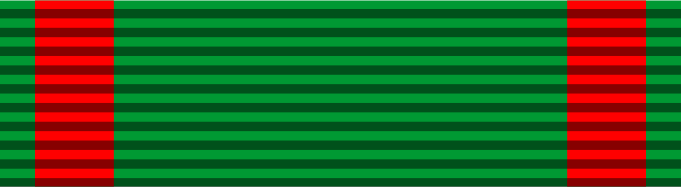

Two medals were given as souvenirs, and Kitchener never wore them. Great War medals were issued posthumously.

=== Honorary regimental appointments ===
- Honorary Colonel, Scottish Command Telegraph Companies (Army Troops, Royal Engineers) – 1898
- Honorary Colonel, East Anglian Divisional Engineers, Royal Engineers – 1901
- Honorary Colonel, 5th (7th Royal Lancashire Militia) Battalion, Lancashire Fusiliers – 11 June 1902; later 3rd (Reserve) Battalion, Lancashire Fusiliers
- Honorary Colonel, 4th, later 6th Battalion, Royal Scots – 1905
- Colonel Commandant, Royal Engineers – 1906
- Honorary Colonel, 7th Gurkha Rifles – 1908
- Honorary Colonel, 1st County of London Yeomanry – 1910
- Colonel-in-Chief, Corps of New Zealand Engineers – 1911
- Regimental Colonel, Irish Guards – 1914

=== Honorary degrees and offices ===
- Freedom of the borough, Southampton, 12 July 1902
- Freedom of the borough, Ipswich, 22 September 1902
- Freedom of the city, Sheffield, 30 September 1902.
- Freedom of the borough, Chatham, 4 October 1902
- Honorary Freedom of the City of Liverpool, 11 October 1902
- Honorary Freeman of the Worshipful Company of Fishmongers
- Honorary Freeman of the Worshipful Company of Grocers, 1 August 1902.

=== Arms ===
Coat of arms of Herbert Kitchener, 1st Earl Kitchener
Coronet A Coronet of an Earl Crest 1st (of augmentation), issuant from a mural crown or an elephant’s head proper holding in the trunk a sword erect of the first; 2nd, a stag’s head erased, the neck transfixed by an arrow proper between the attires a horseshoe or. Escutcheon Gules, between three bustards close proper a chevron azure, cotised argent; (for augmentations) a pile or, thereon the British and Turkish flags in saltire proper, the staffs encircled by a mural crown gules inscribed "Khartoum" in letters of gold; a chief argent, thereon a pale gules charged with a lion passant guardant or, between on the dexter side an eagle displayed sable, and on the sinister on a mount vert an orange tree fructed proper. Supporters Dexter, a camel proper, bridle trappings and line pendent reflexed over the back gules, gorged with a collar or suspended therefrom an escutcheon paly bendy azure and ermine, a canton of the last charged with a portcullis gold; sinister, a gnu proper gorged with a collar or suspended therefrom an escutcheon ermine charged with a chevron engrailed vert thereon four horseshoes or. Motto Thorough Symbolism The coat of arms displays two Augmentations of honour; the first (A pile or, thereon the British and Turkish flags in saltire proper, the staffs encircled by a mural crown gules inscribed "Khartoum" in letters of gold ) was awarded after having received the title of Baron Kitchener after his efforts in the Anglo-Egyptian conquest of Sudan; the second (A chief argent, thereon a pale gules charged with a lion passant guardant or, between on the dexter side an eagle displayed sable, and on the sinister on a mount vert an orange tree fructed proper) was awarded after his efforts in the Second Boer War. Previous versions

== See also ==
- Anglo-Egyptian conquest of Sudan – a reconquest of territory lost by the Khedives of Egypt in 1884 and 1885 during the Mahdist War
- Frances Parker – niece and a New Zealand-born British suffragette.
- I Was Lord Kitchener's Valet – a clothing boutique which achieved fame in 1960s "Swinging London"
- Kitchener's Army – an all-volunteer army formed in the United Kingdom from 1914
- Kitchener bun – a type of sweet pastry made and sold in South Australia
- Kitchener, Ontario – Canadian city renamed from Berlin after Kitchener's death
- Scapegoats of the Empire – a book by George Witton
- Statue of the Earl Kitchener, London

== Sources ==
- Anon., "Kitchener of Khartoum, Viscount", in Debrett's peerage, baronetage, knightage, and companionage, London: Dean & Son, 1903, p. 483-484.
- Asher, Michael (2005). Khartoum The Ultimate Imperial Adventure. London: Penguin. ISBN 978-0140258554.
- Bonham-Carter, Victor (1963). Soldier True: The Life and Times of Field-Marshal Sir William Robertson. London: Frederick Muller Limited.
- Burg, David (2010). Almanac of World War I. The University Press of Kentucky. ASIN B0078XFMK0.
- Burnham, Frederick Russell (1944). Taking Chances. Los Angeles, California: Haynes Corp. ISBN 1879356325.
- Cassar, George H. (1977). Kitchener: Architect of Victory. London: Kimber. ISBN 978-0718303358.
- Cassar, George H. (1985). The Tragedy of Sir John French. University of Delaware Press. ISBN 087413241X.
- Cassar, George H. (2016). Kitchener as Proconsul of Egypt, 1911–1914. Springer. ISBN 978-3319393636.
- Conder, C. R.; Kitchener, H. H. (1881–1885). E. H. Palmer; W. Besant (eds.). Survey of Western Palestine: Memoirs of Topography, Orography, Hydrography and Archaeology (3 vols). London: Palestine Exploration Fund. OCLC 1894216.
- Faught, C. Brad (2016). Kitchener: Hero and Anti-Hero. London and New York: I.B. Tauris. ISBN 978-1784533502.
- Goldstone, Patricia (2007). Aaronsohn's Maps: The Untold Story of the Man Who Might Have Created Peace in the Middle East. Houghton Mifflin Harcourt. ISBN 978-0151011698.
- De Groot, Gerard (1988). Douglas Haig 1861–1928. Larkfield, Maidstone: Unwin Hyman. ISBN 978-0044401926.
- Hankey, Lord (1961). The Supreme Command: 1914–1918. George Allen & Unwin. ASIN B006HSKXCE.
- Hastings, Max (1986). The Oxford Book of Military Anecdotes. Oxford University Press. ISBN 978-0195205282.
- Heathcote, Tony (1999). The British Field Marshals 1736–1997. Barnsley (UK): Pen & Sword. ISBN 0850526965.
- Holmes, Richard (2004). The Little Field Marshal: A Life of Sir John French. Weidenfeld & Nicolson. ISBN 0297846140.
- Hull, Edward (1885). Mount Seir, Sinai and Western Palestine. Richard Bentley and sons. ISBN 978-1402189852.
- Hyam, Ronald (1991). Empire and Sexuality: British Experience. Manchester University Press. ISBN 978-0719025051.
- Hyde, Montgomery (1972). The Other Love: An Historical and Contemporary Survey of Homosexuality in Britain. London: Mayflower Books Ltd. ISBN 978-0434359028.
- Irvine, James (2016). HMS Hampshire: a Century of Myths and Mysteries Unravelled. Budge, Brian; Callister, Jude; Heath, Kevin; Hollinrake, Andrew; Grieve, Issy; Johnson, Keith; Kermode, Neil; Lowrey, Michael; Muir, Tom; Turton, Emily; Wade, Ben. Orkney Heritage Society. ISBN 978-0953594573.
- Judd, Denis (2011). Empire: The British Imperial Experience from 1765 to the Present. I B Tauris Academic. ISBN 978-1848859951.
- Kelly's Handbook of the Titled, Landed and Official Classes (42 ed.). Kelly's. 1916. p. 874 – via archive.org.
- Korieh, Chima J.; Njoku, Raphael Chijioke (2007). Missions, States, and European Expansion in Africa. Routledge. ISBN 978-0415955591.
- Liddell Hart, Basil (1930). A History of the World War. Faber & Faber. ISBN 0333582616.
- MacLaren, Roy (1978). Canadians on the Nile, 1882–1898: Being the Adventures of the Voyageurs on the Khartoum Relief Expedition and Other Exploits. University of British Columbia Press. ISBN 978-0774800945.
- Massie, Robert (2012). Dreadnought: Britain, Germany, and the Coming of the Great War. New York: Random House. ISBN 978-0307819932.
- Neillands, Robin (2006). The Death of Glory: the Western Front 1915. London: John Murray. ISBN 978-0719562457.
- Pakenham, Thomas (1979). The Boer War. Jonathan Ball Publishers. ISBN 978-0868500461.
- Pigott, Peter (2009). Canada In Sudan War Without Borders. Toronto: Dundurn Press. ISBN 978-1550028492.
- Pollock, John (2001). Kitchener: Architect of Victory, Artisan of Peace. Carroll & Graf Publishers. ISBN 0786708298.
- Reid, Walter (2006). Architect of Victory: Douglas Haig. Edinburgh: Birlinn Ltd. ISBN 1841585173.
- Richardson, Frank M. (1981). Mars Without Venus. Imprint unknown. ISBN 978-0851581484.
- Silberman, Neil Asher (1982). Digging for God and Country: Exploration, Archaeology and the Secret Struggle for the Holy Land 1799–1917. New York: Alfred A. Knopf. ISBN 0394511395.
- Terraine, John (1960). Mons, The Retreat to Victory. London: Wordsworth Military Library. ISBN 1840222409.
- Tuchman, Barbara (1962). August 1914. Constable & Co. ISBN 978-0333305164.
- Urban, Mark (2005). Generals: Ten British Generals Who Changed the World. London: Faber & Feber. ISBN 978-0571224876.
- Wood, Clement (1932). The man who killed Kitchener; the life of Fritz Joubert Duquesne. New York: William Faro, inc. ASIN B0006ALPOO.
- Woodward, David R. (1998). Field Marshal Sir William Robertson. Westport Connecticut & London: Praeger. ISBN 0275954226.

Military offices
Preceded by Lord Grenfell	Sirdar of the Egyptian Army; 1892–1899	Succeeded by Sir Reginald Wingate
Political offices
Abdallahi ibn Muhammad overthrown	Governor-General of the Sudan; 1899	Succeeded by Sir Reginald Wingate
Preceded by Sir John Eldon Gorst	British Consul-General in Egypt; 1911–1914	Succeeded by Sir Milne Cheetham as Acting High Commissioner
Preceded by H. H. Asquith	Secretary of State for War; 5 August 1914 – 5 June 1916	Succeeded by David Lloyd George
Military offices
Preceded by Lord Roberts	Commander-in-Chief of British Forces in South Africa; 1900–1902	None End of Second Boer War
Preceded by Sir Arthur Palmer	Commander-in-Chief, India; 1902–1909	Succeeded by Sir O'Moore Creagh
Academic offices
Preceded by Earl of Minto	Rector of the University of Edinburgh; 1914–1916	Succeeded by Earl Beatty
Peerage of the United Kingdom
New creation	Earl Kitchener; 1914–1916	Succeeded by Henry Kitchener
New creation	Viscount Kitchener of Khartoum; 1902–1916	Succeeded by Henry Kitchener
New creation	Baron Kitchener of Khartoum; 1898–1916	Extinct
