= G. W. Steevens =

English journalist (1869–1900)

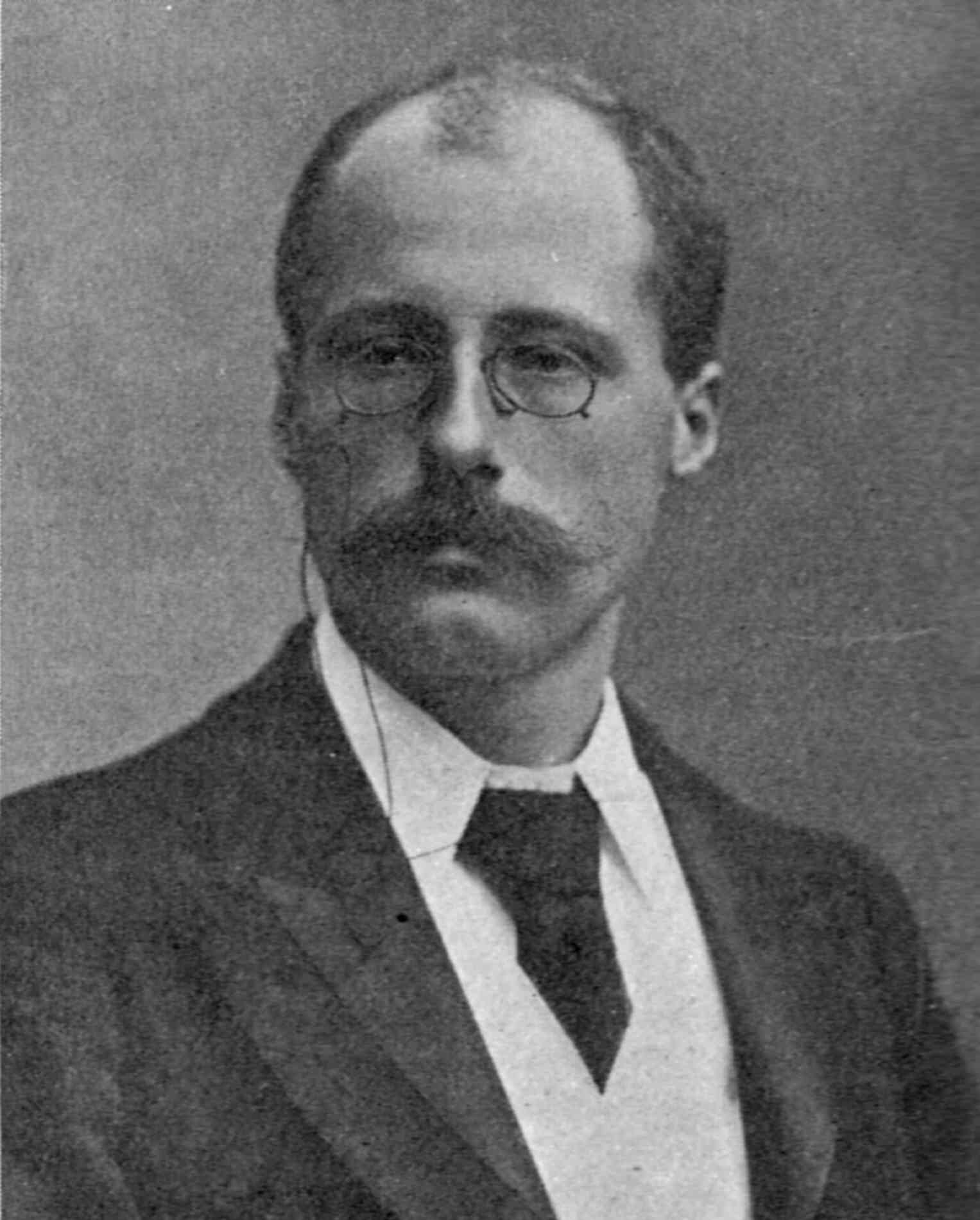
- Born: George Warrington Steevens; 10 December 1869; Sydenham, England
- Died: 15 January 1900 (aged 30); Ladysmith, southern Africa
- Education: City of London School; Balliol College, Oxford
- Occupations: journalist, writer
- Writing career
- Genres: Journalism; non-fiction

George Warrington Steevens (10 December 1869 – 15 January 1900) was a British journalist and writer.

== Life ==
Steevens was born in Sydenham, and educated at the City of London School and Balliol College, Oxford. He was elected a fellow of Pembroke College, Oxford, in 1893 and also spent some time at Cambridge where he edited a weekly periodical.

As a journalist, he distinguished himself by his clearness of vision and vivid style, and was connected successively with the National Observer, The Pall Mall Gazette, and, from 1896, the Daily Mail.

He was the most famous war correspondent of his time, before being eclipsed by the daring escape of young Churchill from a Pretoria prison. Steevens utilised the articles which appeared in these and other publications in various books, such as Monologues of the Dead (1895), The Land of the Dollar (America) (1897), With the Conquering Turk (1897), With Kitchener to Khartum, chronicling his attachment to British forces during the Mahdist War in the Sudan, The Tragedy of Dreyfus and his posthumous From Cape Town to Ladysmith. He is also the author of In India, a series of articles on India published in 1899.

He was appointed by the Daily Mail as war correspondent to South Africa during the Second Boer War in 1899. Caught in the siege of Ladysmith, he kept up morale during the early months with his mordant witticisms appearing in Ladysmith Lyre (e.g. "a strange sideway out of Ladysmith" for death by disease or starvation). He died of enteric fever (now more commonly known as typhoid) on 15 January 1900, six weeks before the Natal Field Army of Redvers Buller relieved Ladysmith.

== In popular culture ==
Jack London credited Steevens with inventing the cocktail Abu Hamed in the opening lines of his story "The Inevitable White Man," from South Sea Tales. Steevens describes having the drink in Atbara in With Kitchener To Khartum.

== Sources ==
- Chisholm, Hugh, ed. (1911). "Steevens, George Warrington" . Encyclopædia Britannica. Vol. 25 (11th ed.). Cambridge University Press. p. 869.
- Lee, Sidney (1901). "Steevens, George Warrington" . In Lee, Sidney (ed.). Dictionary of National Biography (1st supplement). London: Smith, Elder & Co.
- Lee, Sidney; Stearn, Roger T. "Steevens, George Warrington (1869–1900)". Oxford Dictionary of National Biography (online ed.). Oxford University Press. doi:10.1093/ref:odnb/26356. (Subscription, Wikipedia Library access or UK public library membership required.)
