= James Wolfe Murray =

British Army officer

Lieutenant-General Sir James Wolfe Murray KCB
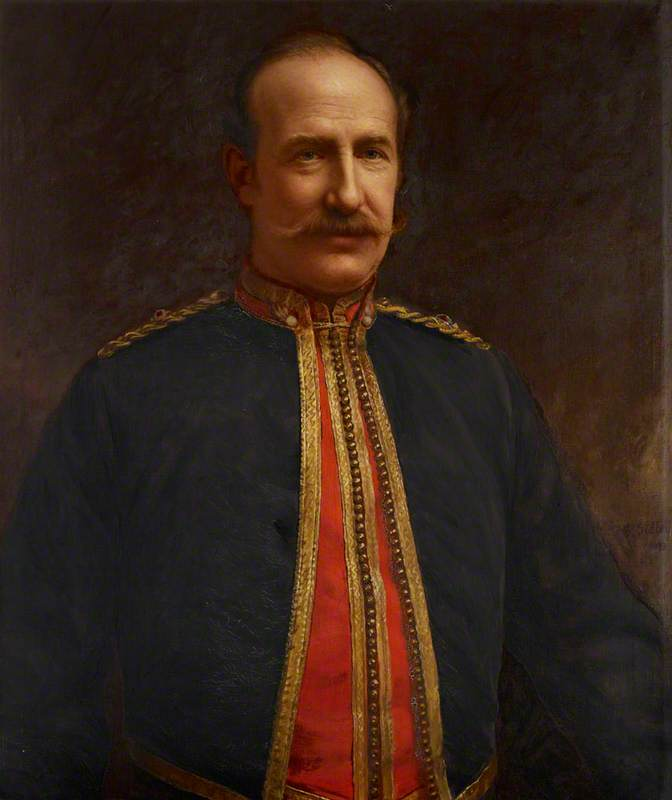
- Portrait by Samuel Sidley, 1893
- Born: 13 March 1853; Ireland
- Died: 17 October 1919 (aged 66) Cringletie, Peeblesshire, Scotland
- Allegiance: United Kingdom
- Branch: British Army
- Service years: 1872–1917
- Rank: Lieutenant-General
- Commands: Eastern Command; Chief of the Imperial General Staff; Scottish Command; 9th (Secunderabad) Division
- Conflicts: Fourth Anglo-Ashanti War; Second Boer War; First World War
- Awards: Knight Commander of the Order of the Bath; Order of Saint Anna, 1st Class (Russia); Order of the White Eagle (Russia); Grand Cordon of the Order of the Sacred Treasure (Japan)

Lieutenant-General Sir James Wolfe Murray KCB (13 March 1853 – 17 October 1919) was a British Army officer who served in the Fourth Anglo-Ashanti War, Second Boer War and First World War. He became Chief of the Imperial General Staff three months after the start of the First World War, but was ineffectual and was replaced in September 1915 following the failure of the Dardanelles campaign.

== Military career ==
Murray was born the son of Brigadier General James Wolfe Murray (1814–1890) and Elizabeth Charlotte Murray (née Whyte-Melville).

He was educated at Trinity College, Glenalmond, Harrow School and the Royal Military Academy, Woolwich, Murray was commissioned into the Royal Artillery on 12 September 1872. He was promoted to captain on 1 November 1881. After attending Staff College, Camberley he became Deputy Assistant Adjutant and Quartermaster-General in Northern England January 1884.

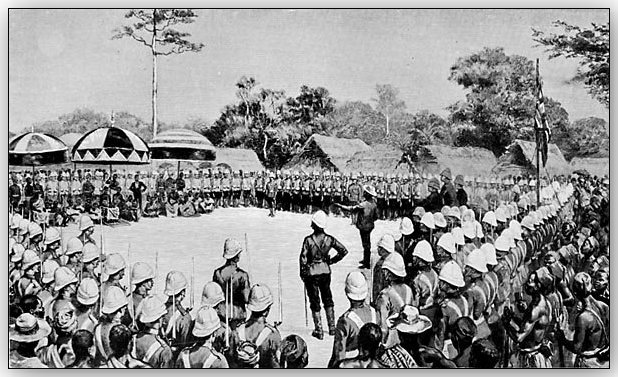
Negotiations following the end of the Fourth Anglo-Ashanti War, in which Murray took part

He went on to be Deputy Assistant Adjutant and Quartermaster-General in the Intelligence Branch at Headquarters of the Army on 1 June 1884, Deputy Assistant-Quartermaster General in the Intelligence Branch on 31 August 1884 and Deputy Assistant Adjutant-General (with responsibility for intelligence on Russia, Central and South Asia and the Far East) on 1 June 1887. Promoted to major in January 1889 he was appointed a special service officer at Headquarters in April 1892 and then Deputy Assistant Adjutant-General for Instruction at Aldershot on 10 January 1894.

He saw action in the Fourth Anglo-Ashanti War in West Africa between November 1895 and February 1896 and was then transferred to India where he became Assistant Adjutant-General on 25 January 1898, receiving promotion to lieutenant colonel on 31 March 1898. He was appointed Assistant Quartermaster General (in charge of intelligence) at Indian Headquarters on 25 March 1899.

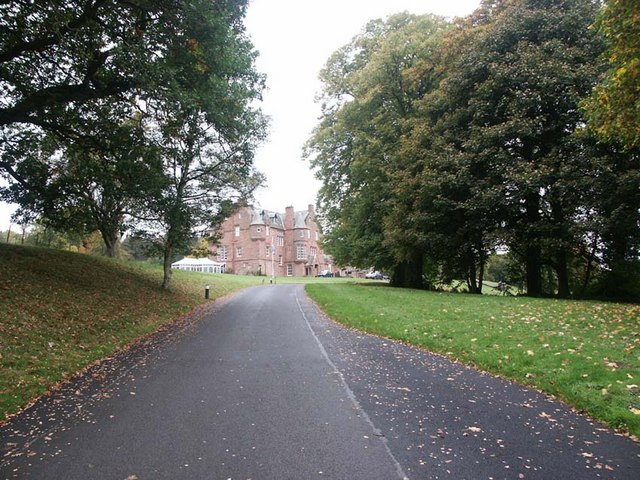
Cringletie House, Murray's home in Peeblesshire

He served in the Second Boer War on the staff of the Commander, Lines of Communication in Natal with the local rank of colonel from 21 September 1899, of brigadier general from 9 October 1899 and of major general on 1 May 1900. He was appointed Knight Commander of the Order of the Bath on 19 April 1901 in recognition of his services during the war.

In May 1901 he returned to India to command a brigade, and received the temporary rank of brigadier general whilst so employed. Promoted to the substantive rank of major-general on 1 January 1903, he was made Quartermaster-General in India on 2 May 1903 and Master-General of the Ordnance at Army Headquarters in London on 12 February 1904. At this time the Esher Committee chaired by Lord Esher was proposing far reaching changes to the structure of the British Army including the creation of a "blue ribbon" elite drawn strictly from the General Staff to the exclusion of Administrative Staff: Murray strongly opposed this aspect of the proposals.

Appointed a deputy lieutenant of the County of Peebles on 25 February 1907, he became General Officer Commanding, 9th (Secunderabad) Division in India on 1 March 1907 and was promoted to lieutenant general on 1 April 1909.

After serving as an army representative on a British delegation to Russia set up by Parliament in 1912, he was appointed Commander-in-Chief at Scottish Command on 9 December 1913 and Commander-in-Chief in South Africa on 18 May 1914.

== First World War ==
Following the sudden death of General Sir Charles Douglas in October 1914, Murray was appointed his replacement as Chief of the Imperial General Staff (CIGS) on 30 October 1914. However Murray attended meetings of the War Council (a gathering of politicians and soldiers which discussed strategy in 1914–15) without making any real contribution, leaving strategy entirely to Field Marshal Lord Kitchener as Secretary of State for War. For this lack of any personal conviction Winston Churchill gave Murray the nickname of "Sheep". General Sir Archibald Murray, Deputy CIGS from March 1915, later wrote that "Wolfe-Murray, an able soldier and a courteous gentleman, knew little of general staff work, and Kitchener daily bewitched him with his fantastic schemes and kaleidoscopic ill-judged orders". Following the failure of the Dardanelles campaign, Murray was replaced by General Sir Archibald Murray on 26 September 1915.

After undertaking a special mission to Russia in the spring of 1916, he was made General Officer Commanding (GOC) of Eastern Command on 5 May 1916 and awarded the Russian Order of St. Anna (1st Class, with Swords) on 16 May 1916. He was awarded the Russian Order of the White Eagle on 14 January 1918 and the Grand Cordon of the Japanese Order of the Sacred Treasure on 9 November 1918.

He was also colonel-commandant of the Royal Artillery from 9 April 1917 and wrote two handbooks on the Russian Army. He died from a heart attack at his home at Cringletie in Peeblesshire on 17 October 1919.

== Family ==
In 1875, he married Arabella Bray; they had two sons and three daughters. Following the death of his first wife he married Fanny Macfarlane (née Robson) in 1913.

His niece was the journalist Stella Wolfe Murray.

== Books ==
- Victor Bonham-Carter (1963). Soldier True:the Life and Times of Field-Marshal Sir William Robertson. London: Frederick Muller Limited.

Military offices
Unknown	Master-General of the Ordnance; 1904–1907	Succeeded by Sir Charles Hadden
Preceded by Sir Bruce Hamilton	GOC-in-C Scottish Command; 1913–1914	Succeeded by Sir Spencer Ewart
Preceded by Sir Charles Douglas	Chief of the Imperial General Staff; 1914–1915	Succeeded by Sir Archibald Murray
Preceded by Sir Leslie Rundle	GOC-in-C Eastern Command; 1916–1917	Succeeded by Sir Henry Wilson
