= Charles Douglas (British Army officer) =

British Army general

General Sir Charles Douglas GCB
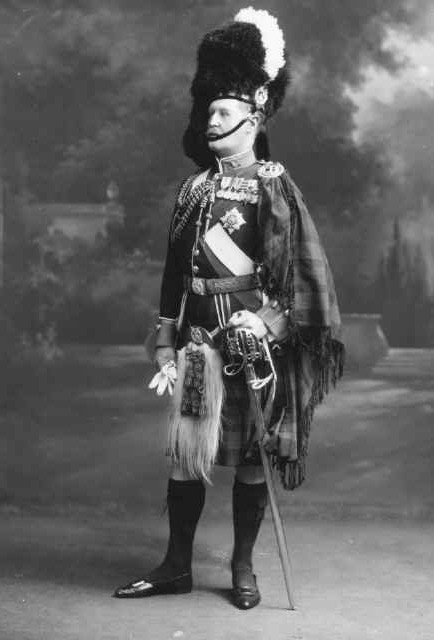
- Born: 17 July 1850; Cape of Good Hope, South Africa
- Died: 25 October 1914 (aged 64); London, England
- Burial place: Kensal Green Cemetery
- Relatives: Major General Sir William Douglas (brother)
- Military career
- Allegiance: United Kingdom
- Branch: British Army
- Service years: 1869–1914
- Rank: General
- Unit: 92nd Highlanders
- Commands: Chief of the Imperial General Staff; Southern Command; 2nd Division; 1st Infantry Brigade; 9th Infantry Brigade
- Conflicts: Second Anglo-Afghan War; First Boer War; Suakin Expedition; Second Boer War; First World War
- Awards: Knight Grand Cross of the Order of the Bath; Mentioned in Despatches

General Sir Charles Whittingham Horsley Douglas, GCB (17 July 1850 – 25 October 1914) was a British Army officer who served in the Second Anglo-Afghan War, the First Boer War, the Suakin Expedition, the Second Boer War and the First World War. He was Chief of the Imperial General Staff during the first three months of the First World War but died from strain and overwork without having any meaningful influence on the outcome of the war.

== Military career ==
Douglas was born the son of William Douglas and Caroline Douglas (née Hare), at the Cape of Good Hope, South Africa. He was educated privately, and commissioned as an ensign in the 92nd Highlanders on 16 December 1869. He was promoted to lieutenant on 28 October 1871 and became adjutant of the 92nd Highlanders on 31 December 1876.

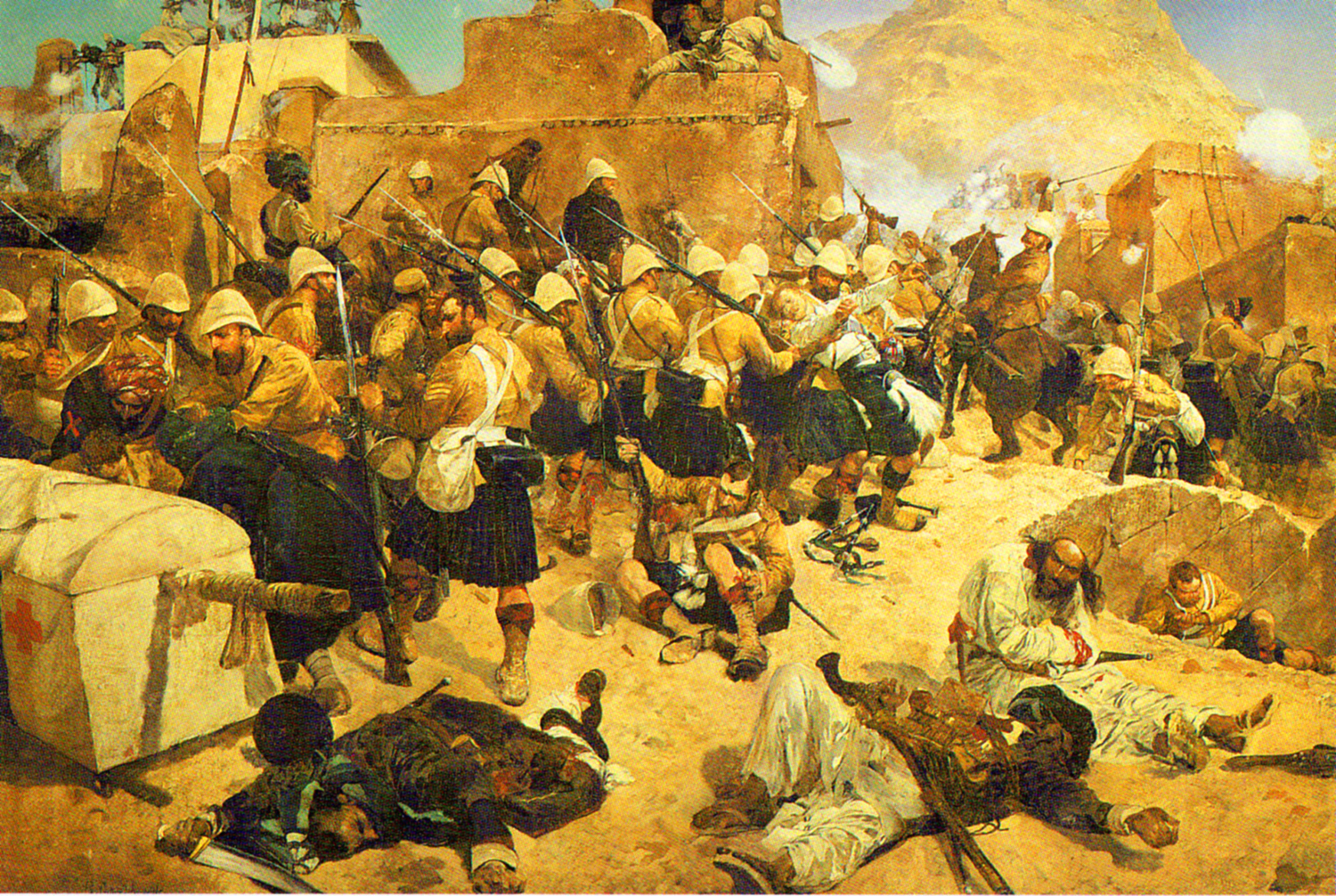
The Battle of Kandahar, in which Douglas took part, during the Second Anglo-Afghan War

Douglas served in the Second Anglo-Afghan War and, having been promoted to captain on 29 July 1880, participated in the 320 mile march from Kabul to Kandahar in Afghanistan between 9–31 August 1880, under the command of General Frederick Roberts, earning the Kabul to Kandahar Star. He also took part in the Battle of Kandahar on 1 September 1880 and was mentioned in despatches.

Douglas also served in the First Boer War between 1880 and 1881 and was again mentioned in despatches. Promoted to brevet major on 1 March 1881, he became adjutant of his regiment again on 25 February 1882. He went on the Suakin Expedition to Sudan in 1884 and became Deputy Assistant-Adjutant and Quartermaster-General on the Staff in Egypt on 6 March 1885. He then returned to England to become adjutant of 7th Middlesex (London Scottish) Rifle Volunteers on 1 November 1886. Promoted to the substantive rank of major on 28 November 1890, he was appointed brigade major to the 1st Infantry Brigade in 1893.

Promoted to lieutenant colonel on 29 May 1895, Douglas became Deputy Assistant Adjutant-General at Aldershot Command on 1 October 1895 and Assistant Adjutant-General at Aldershot Command with the rank of brevet colonel on 28 March 1898. He was made Aide-de-Camp to the Queen on 11 May 1898 and given the substantive rank of colonel on 18 May 1898.

Douglas served in the Second Boer War from 1899 until early 1901. He was initially Assistant Adjutant-General on the Headquarters staff in South Africa from 9 October 1899, then served as ADC and Chief of Staff to Lord Methuen, the General Officer Commanding 1st Division. It was in this role he took part in the Battle of Modder River (November 1899) and the Battle of Magersfontein (10–11 December 1899), in which the defending Boer force defeated the advancing British forces amongst heavy casualties for the latter. Douglas was mentioned in the despatch from Lord Methuen describing the battle. He was promoted to the local rank of major general and made Commander of the 9th Infantry Brigade on 10 February 1900, shortly before the Relief of Kimberley. Following the Siege of Mafeking, Douglas was appointed Commander of Mafeking and the adjacent district on 28 August 1900. The rank of major-general was confirmed for "distinguished service in the field" in early 1901 (but dated to the initial appointment on 10 February 1900).

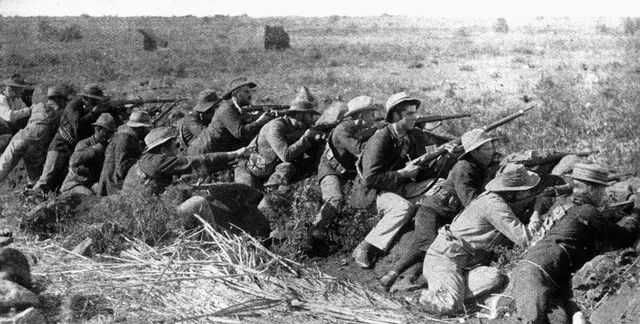
Scene from the Siege of Mafeking, at which Douglas commanded the 9th Infantry Brigade, during the Second Boer War

After returning to England, he became Commander of 1st Infantry Brigade at Aldershot Garrison on 31 October 1901 and General Officer Commanding 2nd Division within First Army Corps on 1 April 1902. He became Adjutant-General to the Forces on 12 February 1904. At this time the Esher Committee chaired by Lord Esher was proposing far reaching changes to the structure of the British Army including the creation of a "blue ribbon" elite drawn strictly from the General Staff to the exclusion of Administrative Staff: Douglas strongly opposed this aspect of the proposals.

Having been promoted to lieutenant general on 3 April 1905, he became General Officer Commanding-in-Chief at Southern Command on 1 June 1909. He took part in the funeral procession following the death of King Edward VII in May 1910 and, having been promoted to general on 31 October 1910, became Inspector-General of Home Forces on 5 March 1912. He was also Colonel of the Gordon Highlanders from 25 June 1912.

Douglas replaced Field Marshal Sir John French as Chief of the Imperial General Staff on 6 April 1914. Douglas served in that role during the First World War, which started in August 1914, but did not have any major impact on its conduct during the first three months, leaving strategic control to Field Marshal Lord Kitchener as War Minister. He became Aide-de-Camp General to the King on 30 June 1914.

Douglas, who had not been in the best of health, died from strain and overwork at his home at Eaton Square in London on 25 October 1914 and was replaced by Lieutenant General Sir James Murray. He was buried in Kensal Green Cemetery (Plot 188, Path Side, Grave 44434).

== Family ==
In 1887 Douglas married Ida de Courcy (née Gordon); they had no children.

Military offices
Preceded by Francis Clery	General Officer Commanding 2nd Division; 1902–1904	Succeeded by Bruce Hamilton
Preceded by Sir Thomas Kelly-Kenny	Adjutant-General to the Forces; 1904–1909	Succeeded by Sir Ian Hamilton
Preceded by Sir Ian Hamilton	GOC-in-C Southern Command; 1909–1912	Succeeded by Sir Horace Smith-Dorrien
Preceded by Sir John French (as Inspector-General of the Forces)	Inspector General of the Home Forces; 1912–1914	Succeeded by Sir John French
Preceded by Sir John French	Chief of the Imperial General Staff; 1914	Succeeded by Sir James Murray
