= Mediterranean Command =

Mediterranean Command was a short-lived command of the British Army in the early twentieth century, based in Malta. It had nominal command of the British troops around the Mediterranean Sea: in Malta, Gibraltar, Cyprus and Egypt.

== History ==
The post was created in 1907 for King Edward VII's brother, Field Marshal the Duke of Connaught. Connaught, as Inspector-General of the Forces, had antagonised the War Office by his negative reports on the Esher reforms of the Army. He was too senior to be sacked, so was shifted sideways into the Mediterranean Command. He regarded the post as "the fifth wheel on the coach" and only accepted it on the King's insistence, but resigned two years later, effectively ending his military career. The post was next offered to Lord Kitchener, recently returned as Commander-in-Chief, India. Kitchener, who had ambitions to be appointed Viceroy, also had to be persuaded by the King to accept, but first went on a seven-month world tour. On his return in April 1910 the King released him from his promise to take up the post. Instead the Adjutant-General Sir Ian Hamilton was appointed, with the additional role of Inspector-General of Overseas Forces to make the job more attractive.

Field Marshal Commanding-in-Chief and High Commissioner in the Mediterranean

- 31 December 1907: Field Marshal HRH The Duke of Connaught and Strathearn

General Officer Commanding-in-Chief and High Commissioner in the Mediterranean

- 1 August 1909 (temporary): General Sir Frederick William Edward Forestier-Walker, Governor of Gibraltar
- 1 August 1910: General Sir Ian Standish Monteith Hamilton

In July 1914 Hamilton was back in Britain and, on the outbreak of the First World War the following month, was appointed to command Central Force at home. The position of GOC-in-C Mediterranean was left vacant. On the formation of the Mediterranean Expeditionary Force in March 1915, Hamilton was appointed commander-in-chief.
