= Ian Hamilton (British Army officer) =

British Army officer (1853–1947)

General Sir Ian Hamilton GCB GCMG DSO TD
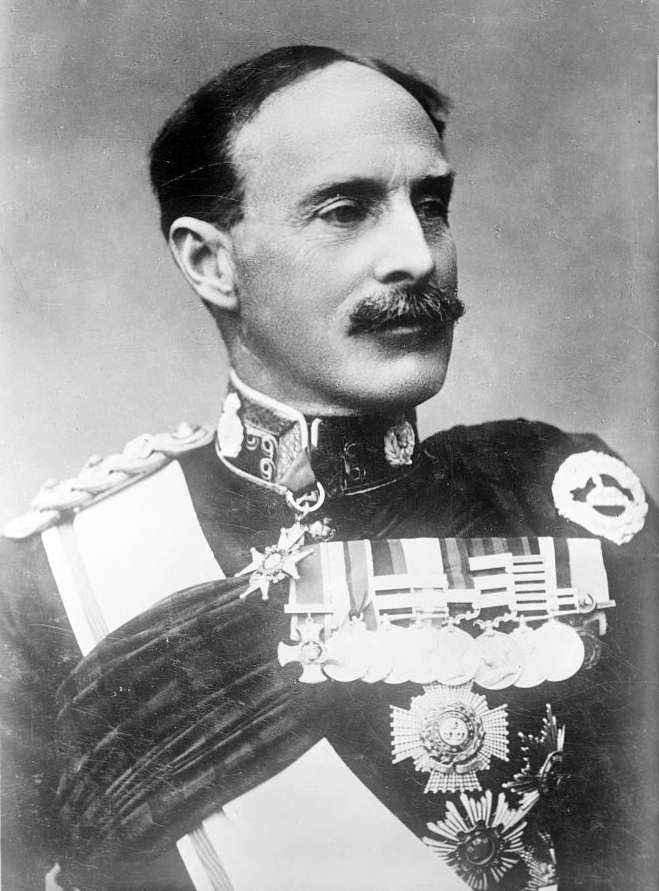
- Hamilton in c. 1910
- Born: 16 January 1853; Corfu, United States of the Ionian Islands
- Died: 12 October 1947 (aged 94); London, England
- Burial place: Kilmadock Cemetery, Doune, Stirlingshire
- Spouse: Jean Muir (m. 1887)
- Children: 2 (adopted)
- Military career
- Allegiance: United Kingdom
- Branch: British Army
- Service years: 1869–1915
- Rank: General
- Commands: Mediterranean Expeditionary Force; Southern Command; 3rd Brigade; 1st Gordon Highlanders
- Conflicts: Second Anglo-Afghan War; First Boer War; Mahdist War; North West Frontier; Second Boer War; Russo-Japanese War; First World War: Gallipoli campaign
- Awards: Knight Grand Cross of the Order of the Bath; Knight Grand Cross of the Order of St Michael and St George; Distinguished Service Order; Territorial Decoration; Mentioned in Despatches; Order of the Red Eagle (Prussia); Order of the Crown (Prussia); Order of Merit (Spain); Order of the Sacred Treasure (Japan)
- Other work: Lieutenant of the Tower of London (1918–20); Rector of the University of Edinburgh (1932–35)

General Sir Ian Standish Monteith Hamilton (16 January 1853 – 12 October 1947) was a British Army officer who had an extensive military career in the Victorian and Edwardian eras. Hamilton was twice recommended for the Victoria Cross, but on the first occasion was considered too young, and on the second too senior. He was wounded in action at the Battle of Majuba during the First Boer War, which rendered his left hand permanently injured. Near the end of his career, he commanded the Mediterranean Expeditionary Force in the Gallipoli campaign of the First World War. After the campaign stalled, he was recalled in October 1915, effectively ending his military career.

== Early life ==
Hamilton was born in Corfu, United States of the Ionian Islands on 16 January 1853. His father was Colonel Christian Monteith Hamilton, former commanding officer of the 92nd Highlanders. His mother Corinna was the daughter of John Vereker, 3rd Viscount Gort. His mother died giving birth to his brother, Vereker, who became a well-known artist. Hamilton received his early formal education at Wellington College, Berkshire. His father then sent him to stay with General Drammers, a Hanoverian who had fought against Prussia.

== Military career ==
Hamilton attended the Royal Military College, Sandhurst in 1869, the first year that entrance to the British Army as an officer was regulated by academic examination rather than by the monetary purchasing of a commission. In 1871 he received a commission as an infantry officer with the Suffolk Regiment, but shortly afterwards transferred to the 2nd Battalion of the Gordon Highlanders, who at that time were on Imperial garrison service in India. On arrival in India Hamilton took part in the Second Anglo-Afghan War.

During the First Boer War he was present at the Battle of Majuba, where he was wounded and taken prisoner of war by the Boers. He later returned to England to recover, where he was treated as a war hero and introduced to Queen Victoria. In 1882 he was made captain and took part in the Nile Expedition of 1884–1885, being promoted to brevet major. In Burma 1886–1887 he became brevet lieutenant colonel. In Bengal from 1890 to 1893, he held the rank of colonel and was awarded the Distinguished Service Order in 1891. He took part in the Chitral Expedition as military secretary to Sir George White, Commander-in-Chief, India, a role he assumed in April 1893. From 1895 to 1898 he held the post of deputy quartermaster general in India. In 1897–1898 he commanded the third brigade in the Tirah Campaign, where his left arm was wounded by a shell.

He returned to England in April 1898 and was soon appointed commandant of the School of Musketry at Hythe, Kent.

=== Second Boer War ===
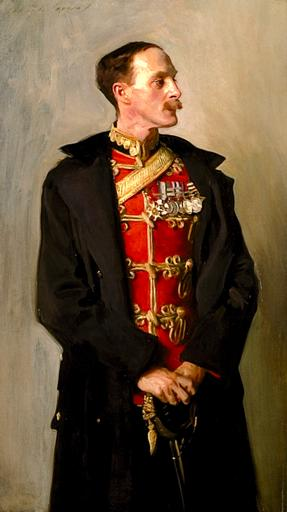
Colonel Ian Hamilton, John Singer Sargent, 1898

Amidst mounting tensions between the United Kingdom and the Boer republics in South Africa Lieutenant General White was dispatched to take command in Natal in September 1899, with Hamilton accompanying him as chief staff officer (assistant adjutant general). The Second Boer War broke out shortly after their arrival and Hamilton commanded the infantry at the Battle of Elandslaagte. At the Battle of Ladysmith Hamilton continued to lead his brigade-sized column, but played no role in the fighting. Defeated in the field, White's Natal Field Force was besieged in Ladysmith from the beginning of November. Hamilton was given command of the southern sector of the town's defences and successfully fought off the only major assault on the garrison at the Battle of Wagon Hill in January. For his part in the siege, he was frequently mentioned in despatches.

After the relief of Ladysmith in February Hamilton took command of a brigade of Mounted Infantry, and from April the Mounted Infantry Division. He was promoted to major general, and knighted as a Knight Commander of the Order of the Bath (KCB). The war correspondent Winston Churchill told of his campaign from Bloemfontein to Pretoria in Ian Hamilton's March (London, 1900, reprinted as the second half of The Boer War), having first met Hamilton in 1897 when they sailed on the same ship. Hamilton travelled 400 miles from Bloemfontein to Pretoria fighting 10 major battles with Boer forces (including the Battle of Rooiwal) and fourteen minor ones, and was recommended twice for the Victoria Cross (which was considered inappropriate because of his rank).

In May 1901 Hamilton was appointed military secretary at the War Office, but the following November he was again asked to return to South Africa as chief of staff to the commander-in-chief, Lord Kitchener. He arrived in South Africa in late November 1901, and received the local rank of lieutenant general. In April 1902 he took command of the military columns operating in the Western Transvaal. Following the end of hostilities in June 1902, he returned to the UK together with Lord Kitchener on board the SS Orotava, which arrived in Southampton on 12 July. They received an enthusiastic welcome on their arrival to London, with thousands of people lining the streets to watch their procession.

In a despatch dated 23 June 1902, Lord Kitchener wrote the following about his work in South Africa:

At much personal convenience, Lord Roberts lent me his Military Secretary, Sir Ian Hamilton, as my Chief of Staff. His high soldierly qualities are already well known, and his reputation does not require to be established now. I am much indebted to him for his able and constant support to me as Chief of Staff, also for the marked skill and self-reliance he showed later, when directing operations in the Western Transvaal.

Hamilton was promoted to lieutenant general "for Distinguished Service in the Field" on 22 August 1902. He returned to his post as military secretary at the War Office in September 1902, and the same month accompanied Lord Roberts, Commander-in-Chief of the Forces, and St John Brodrick, Secretary of State for War, on a visit to Germany to attend the Imperial German Army manoeuvres as guest of the Emperor Wilhelm II. From 1903 to 1904 he was Quartermaster-General to the Forces.

=== Japan ===
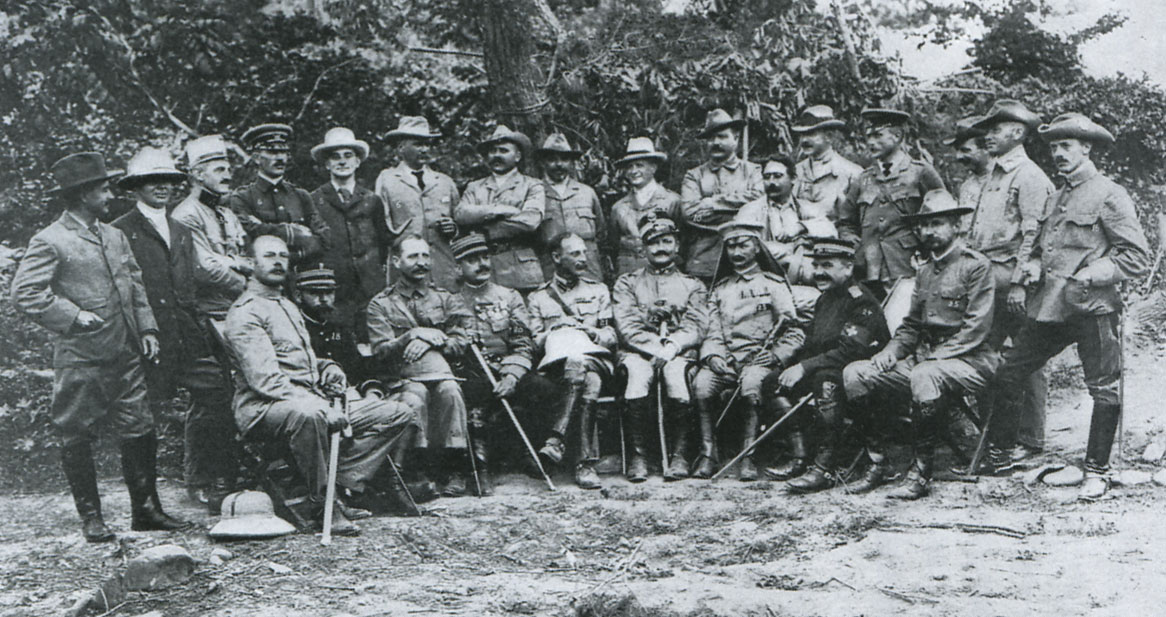
Western military attachés and war correspondents with the Japanese forces after the Battle of Shaho (1904)

From 1904 to 1905, Hamilton was the military attaché of the British Indian Army serving with the Imperial Japanese Army in Manchuria during the Russo-Japanese War. Amongst the several military attachés from Western countries, he was the first to arrive in Japan after the start of the war. He published A Staff Officer's Scrap-Book during the Russo-Japanese War on his experiences and observations during that conflict.

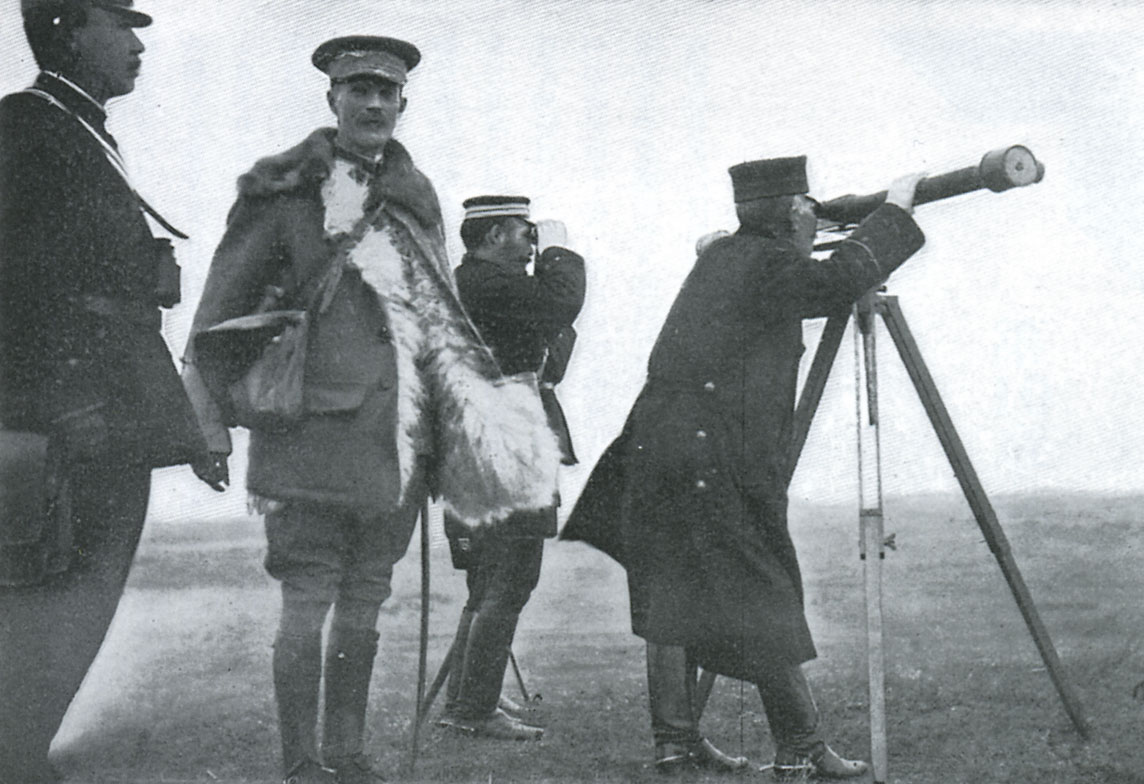
Gen. Sir Ian Hamilton (facing front) with Japanese General Kuroki Tamemoto after the Japanese victory in Battle of Shaho (1904)

This military confrontation between a well-known European army and a less-familiar Asian army was the first time that the tactics of entrenched positions for infantry were defended with machine guns and artillery. This was the first twentieth-century war in which the technology of warfare became increasingly important, factors which came to dominate the evolution of warfare during the First World War. Hamilton wrote that cavalry was obsolete in such a conflict, regarding their role as better accomplished by mounted infantry. He became a supporter of non-traditional tactics such as night attacks and the use of aircraft. Conversely, the successful Japanese infantry assaults convinced him that superior morale would allow an attacker to overcome prepared defensive positions.

== Return to England and Inspector-General of Overseas Forces ==
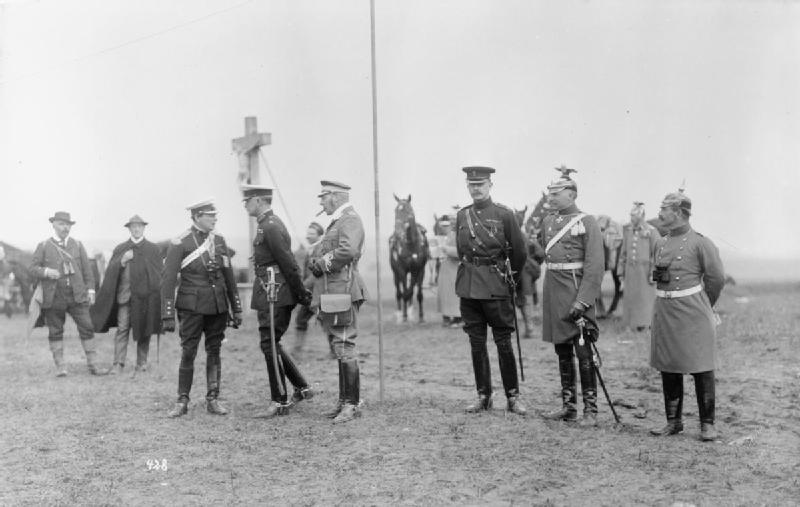
British guests and observers during the Imperial German Army manoeuvres of 1906. Winston Churchill, then a junior minister at the Colonial Office, with the earl of Lonsdale (wearing the uniform of the Westmorland and Cumberland Yeomanry and smoking a cigar) and Lieutenant General Sir Ian Hamilton (third from right)

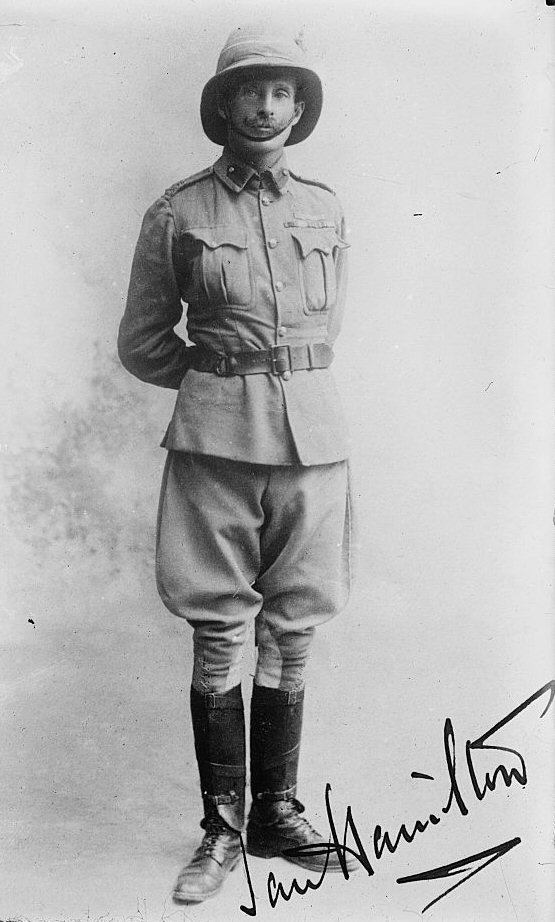
General Hamilton in a formal pose (1910)

Hamilton went on to serve as general officer commanding (GOC) Southern Command between 1905 and 1909 and as Adjutant-General to the Forces between 1909 and 1910. In October 1907, while GOC-in-C Southern Command, he was promoted to general.

By 1911 Hamilton had been appointed, in August 1910, Inspector-General of Overseas Forces, and by 1913 also, additionally, General Officer Commanding-in-Chief Mediterranean Command, with major-generals in Gibraltar, Malta, and Egypt, plus the forces in the Anglo-Egyptian Sudan and Cyprus seemingly reporting to him. In July 1914 he was returning to the United Kingdom with his appointment about to expire. In June 1914 he succeeded General Horace Smith-Dorrien as aide-de-camp general to King George V.

== First World War ==
On 5 August 1914, with the declaration of hostilities between Britain and Germany, Hamilton was appointed as the Commander-in-Chief, Home Army. He also became commander of "Central Force", the predominantly Territorial Force military formation which was charged with repelling any seaborne German invasion of the east coast of England in the early part of the war.

In November 1914 he took over the position of colonel of the Gordon Highlanders from General Sir Charles W. H. Douglas, who had died suddenly.

=== Gallipoli campaign ===
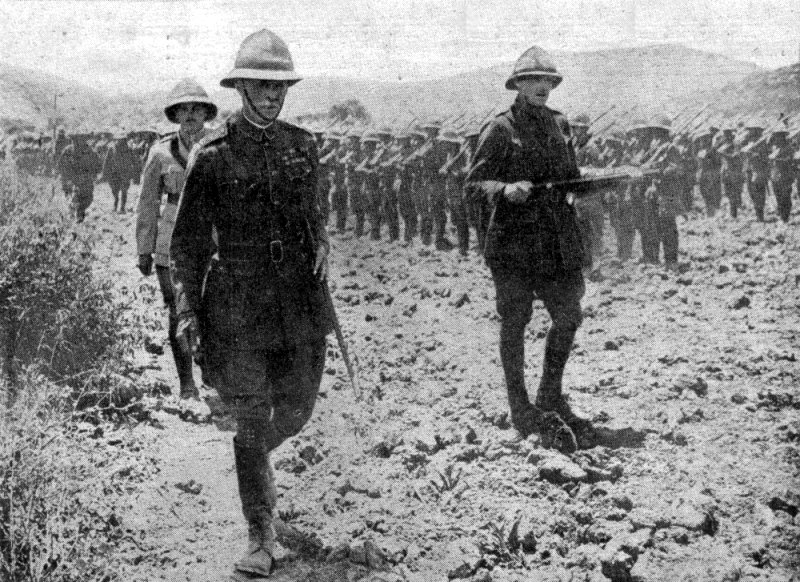
General Sir Ian Hamilton, commander-in-chief of the Mediterranean Expeditionary Force, inspecting the Royal Naval Division at Gallipoli, 1915

In March 1915, Lord Kitchener appointed Hamilton, aged 62, to the command of the Allied Mediterranean Expeditionary Force, with orders to gain control of the Dardanelles straits from the Ottoman Empire and to capture Constantinople. While a senior and respected officer, perhaps more experienced in different campaigns than most, Hamilton was considered too unconventional, too intellectual, and too friendly with politicians to be given a command on the Western Front. Hamilton was not given a chance to take part in planning the campaign. Intelligence reports on the Ottoman Empire's military defensive capacity were poor and underestimated its strength. While the high command of the Greek Army, which possessed far more detailed knowledge of the Ottoman Empire's military capacity, warned Kitchener that a British Expeditionary Force entering the Eastern Mediterranean theatre would require 150,000 troops to capture Gallipoli, Kitchener concluded that a force of 70,000 men would be adequate to overpower any defensive garrison there.

The plan to take control of the Dardanelles and open a new front in the war had been considered in various forms since 1914. In November of that year, ships from the Royal Navy had shelled its outer forts, causing the magazine at Seddülbahir castle to explode. In December 1914, a Royal Navy submarine entered the channel and sank the Turkish warship Mesudiye at Çanakkale. These early experiences raised in Kitchener's mind the prospect of an easy victory for a more ambitious operation, but as a consequence of them, the Turks had set about laying sea-mines in the straits to interdict Allied ships approaching again and strengthened the forts guarding its approaches. On 3 January 1915, the British First Sea Lord, Admiral Sir John Fisher, presented a plan to the British Government for a joint naval and army attack, utilising 75,000 troops, but only on the proviso that it could be launched with little delay. By 21 January 1915, Fisher wrote privately to Admiral Sir John Jellicoe that he could not approve the plan unless 200,000 men were available to carry it through. Winston Churchill, as First Lord of the Admiralty, had initially suggested in September 1914 that the operation would need the support of only 50,000 men, a strength of just over two British Army divisions.

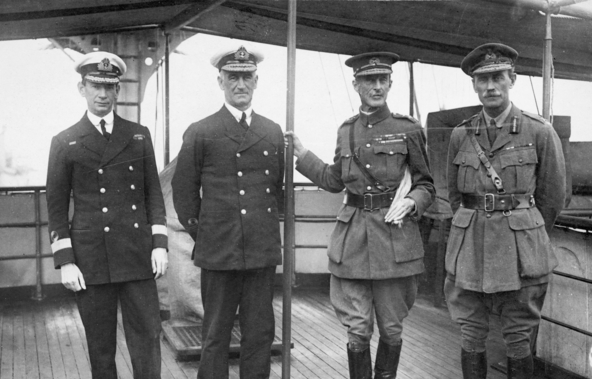
From left to right: Admiral Sir Roger Keyes, Vice-admiral John de Robeck, General Sir Ian Hamilton (his disabled left hand clearly visible), Major General Walter Braithwaite, Hamilton's chief of staff, on board HMS Triad.

Starting on 19 February 1915, British and French warships attempted to take the strait using naval power alone but failed after an abortive attack foundered upon sea mines. Lord Kitchener then decided that an invasion by troops of the Gallipoli peninsula would be required to support the naval operation with a land campaign, led by Hamilton, who became responsible for organising landings there. Hamilton had no specialised landing craft, the disparate troops he had been given had no training for seaborne operations, and supplies for the army had been packed in ways which made them difficult to access for landings. Hamilton believed that the Royal Navy would make further attacks during his campaign; realising its likely losses, however, and fundamentally opposing the idea that tactical losses of its ships in the operation was an acceptable price to pay, the Royal Naval high command declined to mount another attack.

The main landings took place on 25 April 1915, the 29th Division going ashore at Cape Helles and the Australian and New Zealand Army Corps at Anzac Cove. The operation made little progress and incurred heavy casualties; Hamilton nevertheless remained optimistic and opposed moves in London to evacuate.

With the campaign stalled, Hamilton was recalled to London on 16 October 1915, effectively ending his military career. He was replaced by General Sir Charles Monro, who recommended evacuation.

== Later life ==
In retirement, Hamilton was a leading figure in the ex-servicemen organisation, the British Legion, holding the position of Scottish President. He was also a founding member and vice-president of the Anglo-German Association in 1928, which worked to promote rapprochement between Britain and Germany. He maintained a relationship with the Association after Adolf Hitler's rise to power, described himself as "an admirer of the great Adolph Hitler", and dismissed Mein Kampf as a product of Hitler's youth. (In the historian Ian Kershaw's view, however, Hamilton was a pillar of the British Imperial power establishment and not a Nazi supporter, despite his early apparent approval for much of what the early manifestation of Nazi Germany proclaimed). In 1934, at the age of 81, Hamilton was filmed as part of a war documentary film called Forgotten Men.

== Gordon drums ==
In October 1914, during the First World War, the 2nd Battalion Gordon Highlanders landed in Ostend, Belgium, and was transported to the front. They took with them their pipes but the bulky drums were left in Ostend, under the care of the police, because the transport wagons were "overloaded". After Ostend fell to the Germans, the drums were taken to the Zeughaus armoury museum in Berlin as a "war trophy". Twenty years later, in 1934, Hamilton, the regiment's colonel, wrote to Germany's president Paul von Hindenburg requesting the return of the seven drums and von Hindenburg "immediately" agreed. Hamilton travelled personally to the German capital and received the Gordon drums in a ceremony in which he spoke of his wish that there will be "no more war" between the "old allies of Waterloo".

== Death ==
Hamilton died on 12 October 1947, aged 94, at his home at Hyde Park Gardens in London. His body was buried at Kilmadock Cemetery, in Doune, Stirlingshire, Scotland.

== Personal life ==
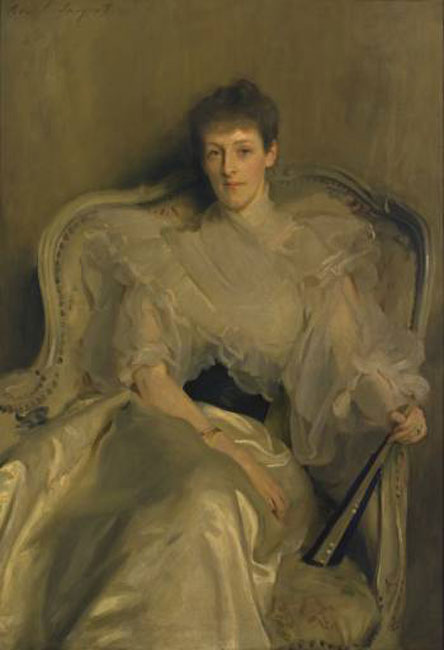
Jean, Wife of Colonel Ian Hamilton, John Singer Sargent, 1896

Hamilton spoke German, French and Hindi, and was considered charming, courtly and kind. He appeared frail yet was full of energy.

In 1887 he married Jean Muir, the daughter of a Glasgow businessman. They originally had no intention of starting a family, but adopted two children after the First World War. His adopted son, Captain Harry Knight, was killed in action in 1941 with the Scots Guards. His adopted daughter, Phyllis James, moved to Austria in the late 1930s, aiming to become an actress. In the following years, she invented an Irish background for herself - as Nora O'Mara, then Rosaleen O'Mara - and became involved with German wartime propaganda and intelligence operations against Ireland. Following the war, she became a writer on Irish culture, under the name Róisín Ni Mhéara, and published a controversial memoir in 1991 defending herself and denying the Holocaust. She died in 2013.

Along with his professional career, Hamilton was a prolific writer. He published a volume of poetry and a novel contemporarily described as risqué. Examples of his written works include: The Fighting of the Future, Icarus, A Jaunt on a Junk, A Ballad of Hadji, and A Staff Officer's Scrapbook. In the introduction to his Gallipoli Diary, he stated: "There is nothing certain about war, except that one side won't win".

He was a cousin of the diarist James Lees-Milne.

== Selected works ==
Hamilton's known published writings encompass 184 works in 568 publications, in six languages, and 4,455 library holdings.

- — (1887). The Ballad of Hádji, and Other Poems.
- — (1905). A Staff officer's Scrap-book during the Russo-Japanese War. Vol. I. London: E. Arnold.
- — (1907). A Staff officer's Scrap-book during the Russo-Japanese War. Vol. II. London & New York: E. Arnold & Longmans, Green. OCLC 10080215.
- — (1910). Compulsory Service; a Study of the Question in the Light of Experience.
- — (1913). National life and national training.
- 1915 – Sir Ian Hamilton's Despatches from the Dardanelles, etc.
- 1919 – The Millennium
- — (1920). Gallipoli Diary. New York: George H. Doran. OCLC 580456.
- — (1921). The Soul and Body of an Army.
- 1923 – The Friends of England; Lectures to Members of the British Legion
- 1926 – Now and Then
- 1939 – When I was a Boy
- 1944 – Listening for the Drums
- 1957 – The Commander

== Assessments ==
British Prime Minister H. H. Asquith remarked that he thought that Hamilton had "too much feather in his brain", whereas Charles Bean, a war correspondent who had reported from the scene of the Gallipoli campaign in 1915 and who went on to write Australia's Official History of the 1914–1918 War, considered that Hamilton possessed "a breadth of mind which the army in general does not possess". Writing in his 'Gallipoli Memories', Sir Compton Mackenzie makes it clear that his view was aligned with that of Charles Bean.

== Honours, awards and decorations ==
Hamilton received the honorary Doctor of Laws (LL.D) from the University of Glasgow in June 1901.

A statue of the then Lt.-Gen Hamilton stands on the Boer War memorial in Cheltenham.

=== Decorations ===
- DSO : Distinguished Service Order – 1891

Most Honourable Order of the Bath

- CB : Companion – 1896 – Chitral relief force
- KCB : Knight Commander – 29 November 1900 – in recognition of services in connection with the campaign in South Africa 1899–1900
- GCB : Knight Grand Cross – 1910

Most Distinguished Order of St Michael and St George

- GCMG : Knight Grand Cross – 1919

Foreign

- Knight 1st class of the Order of the Crown (Prussia) – during his September 1902 visit to Germany to attend German Army manoeuvres

== Legacy ==
- Hamilton Preparatory School, in Ladysmith, KwaZulu-Natal, is named after Hamilton.
- His medals are held by National Museums Scotland.

== See also ==
- Military attachés and observers in the Russo-Japanese War

== Bibliography ==
- Carlyon, Les (2002). Gallipoli. New York: Pan Macmillan. ISBN 978-0-7329-1128-7.
- Cassar, George H. (1994). Asquith As War Leader. A&C Black. ISBN 978-1-85285-117-0.
- Winston Churchill (1900). Ian Hamilton's March
- Hamilton, Ian (1920). Gallipoli Diary. New York: George H. Doran. OCLC 580456.
- Kershaw, Ian (2004). Making friends with Hitler: Lord Londonderry and Britain's road to war. London: Allen Lane. ISBN 978-0-7139-9717-0.
- Kowner, Rotem (2006). Historical Dictionary of the Russo-Japanese War. Lanham, Maryland: The Scarecrow Press. ISBN 0-8108-4927-5.
- Meyer, G.J. (2006). A World Undone: The Story of the Great War, 1914 to 1918. Delacorte Press. ISBN 978-0553803549.
- Rinaldi, Richard A. (2008). Order of Battle of the British Army 1914. Ravi Rikhye. ISBN 9780977607280.

Military offices
Preceded by Sir Coleridge Grove	Military Secretary; 1901–1903	Succeeded by Sir Ronald Lane
Preceded by Sir Charles Clarke	Quartermaster-General to the Forces; 1903–1904	Succeeded by Sir Herbert Plumer
Preceded by Sir Evelyn Wood (as Commander II Army Corps)	GOC-in-C Southern Command; 1905–1909	Succeeded by Sir Charles Douglas
Preceded by Sir Charles Douglas	Adjutant General; 1909–1910	Succeeded by Sir Spencer Ewart
Preceded by Sir Charles Douglas (as Inspector-General Home Forces)	Commander-in-Chief, Home Army; 1914–1915	Succeeded by Sir Leslie Rundle
Academic offices
Preceded by Winston Churchill	Rector of the University of Edinburgh; 1932–1935	Succeeded by The Viscount Allenby
