= Prince Arthur, Duke of Connaught and Strathearn =

British prince (1850–1942)

Prince Arthur
- Duke of Connaught and Strathearn
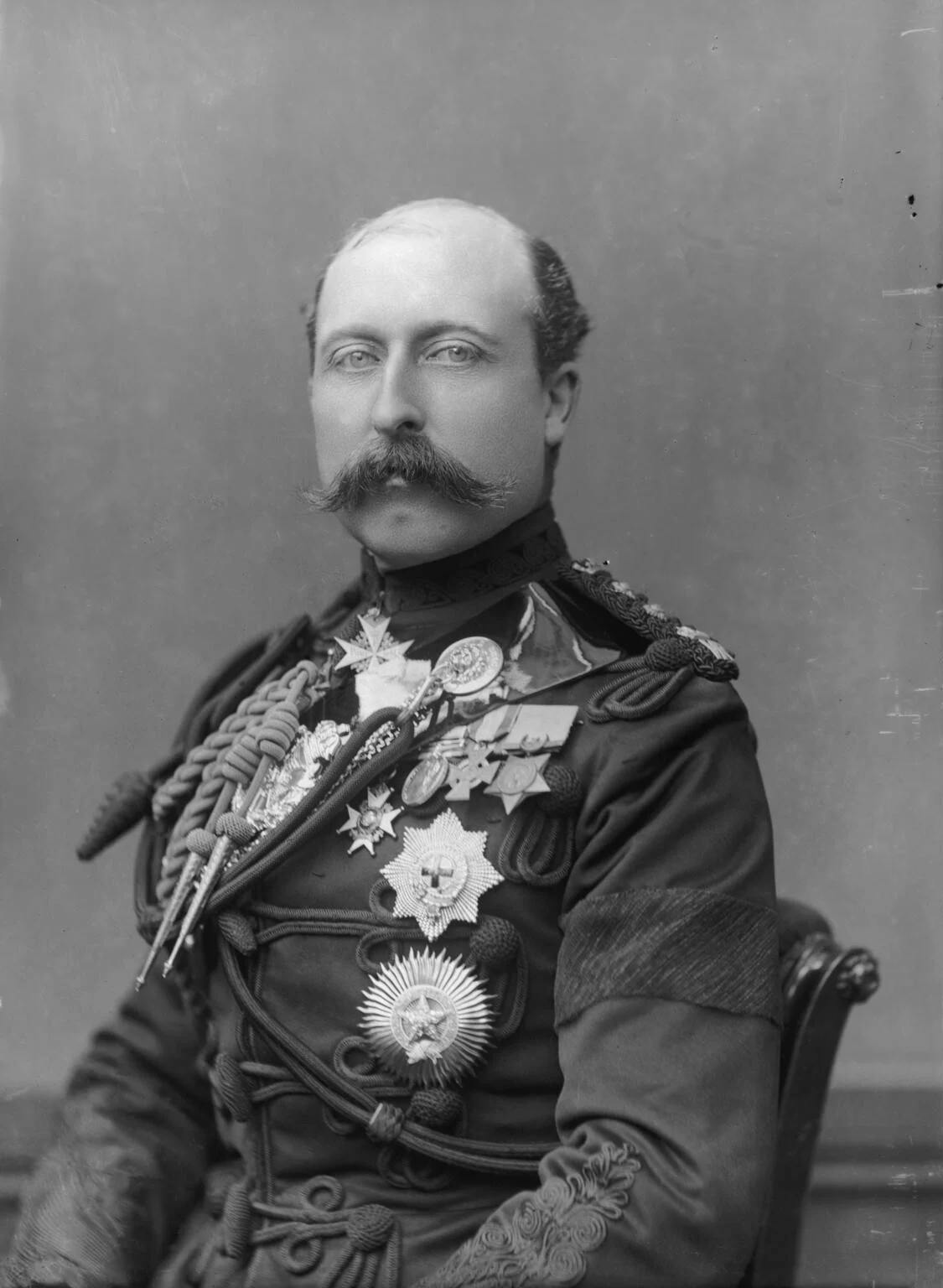
- Photograph by Alexander Bassano, c. 1885

10th Governor General of Canada
- In office 13 October 1911 – 11 November 1916
- Monarch: George V
- Prime Minister: Robert Borden (Canadian); H. H. Asquith (British)
- Preceded by: The Earl Grey
- Succeeded by: The Duke of Devonshire
- Born: 1 May 1850; Buckingham Palace, London, England
- Died: 16 January 1942 (aged 91); Bagshot Park, Surrey, England
- Burial: 23 January 1942; Royal Vault, St George's Chapel, Windsor Castle; 19 March 1942; Royal Burial Ground, Frogmore
- Spouse: Princess Louise Margaret of Prussia (m. 1879; died 1917)
- Issue: Margareta, Crown Princess of Sweden; Prince Arthur of Connaught; Lady Patricia Ramsay
Names
- Arthur William Patrick Albert
- House: Saxe-Coburg and Gotha (until 1917); Windsor (from 1917)
- Father: Prince Albert of Saxe-Coburg and Gotha
- Mother: Queen Victoria
- Education: Royal Military Academy, Woolwich
- Military career
- Branch: British Army
- Service years: 1868–1942
- Rank: Field Marshal
- Units: Royal Engineers; Royal Regiment of Artillery; Rifle Brigade
- Commands: Inspector-General of the Forces; Commander-in-Chief, Ireland; Third Army Corps; Aldershot Command; Southern Command; Bombay Army
- Conflicts: Fenian Raids: Battle of Eccles Hill; Anglo-Egyptian War
- Awards: Volunteer Officers' Decoration; Territorial Decoration

Prince Arthur, Duke of Connaught and Strathearn (Arthur William Patrick Albert; 1 May 1850 – 16 January 1942), was the seventh child and third son of Queen Victoria of the United Kingdom and Prince Albert of Saxe-Coburg and Gotha. He served as Governor General of Canada, the tenth since Canadian Confederation and the only British prince to do so.

Arthur was educated by private tutors before entering the Royal Military Academy at Woolwich at 16 years old. Upon graduation, he was commissioned as a lieutenant in the British Army, where he served for some 40 years, seeing service in various parts of the British Empire and rising to the rank of field marshal. During this time, he was also created a royal duke, becoming Duke of Connaught and Strathearn as well as Earl of Sussex. In 1900, he was appointed as Commander-in-Chief, Ireland, which he regretted; his preference was to join the campaign against the Boers in South Africa. In 1911, he was appointed Governor General of Canada, replacing Albert Grey, 4th Earl Grey, as viceroy. He occupied this post until he was succeeded by Victor Cavendish, 9th Duke of Devonshire, in 1916. He acted as the King's, and thus the Canadian Commander-in-Chief's, representative through the first years of the First World War.

After the end of his viceregal tenure, Arthur returned to Britain and performed various royal duties there and in Ireland, while also again taking up military duties. Though he retired from public life in 1928, he continued to make his presence known in the army well into the Second World War, before his death in 1942. He was Queen Victoria's last surviving son.

== Early life ==
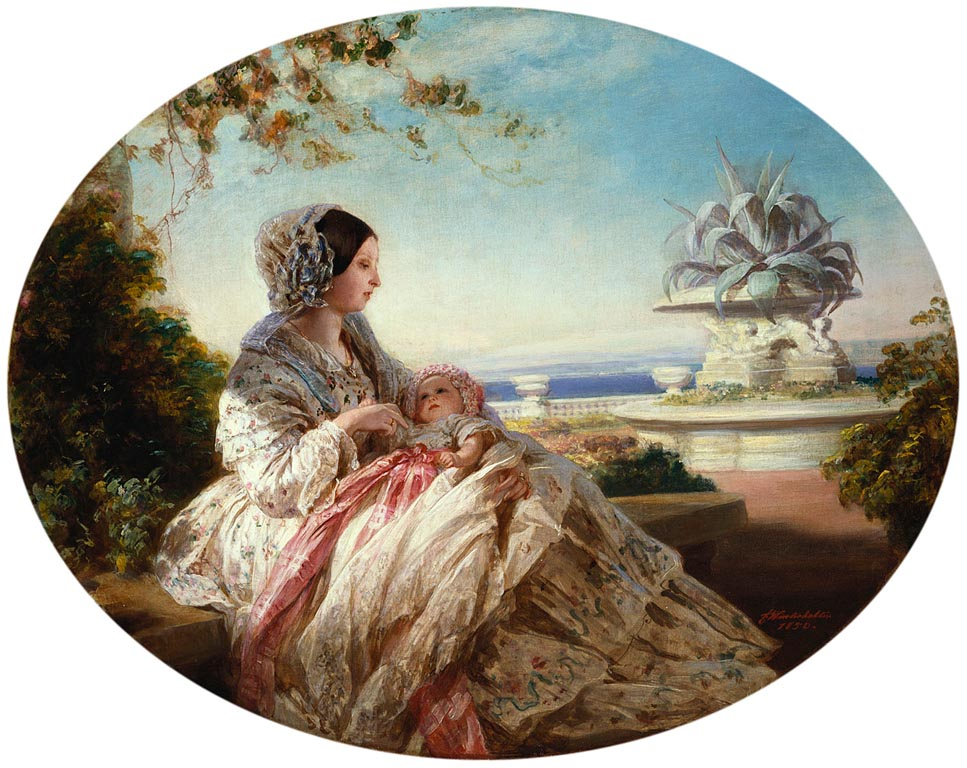
A painting of Queen Victoria with Prince Arthur by Franz Xaver Winterhalter

Arthur was born at 8:20 am on 1 May 1850 at Buckingham Palace, the seventh child and third son of Queen Victoria and Prince Albert. He was baptised by the Archbishop of Canterbury, John Bird Sumner, on 22 June in the palace's private chapel. His godparents were Prince William of Prussia (the later King of Prussia and German Emperor Wilhelm I); his great-uncle's sister-in-law, Princess Bernard of Saxe-Weimar-Eisenach (for whom his maternal grandmother the Duchess of Kent stood proxy); and the Duke of Wellington, with whom he shared his birthday and after whom he was named. As with his older brothers, Arthur received his early education from private tutors. It was reported that he became the Queen's favourite child.

== Military career ==
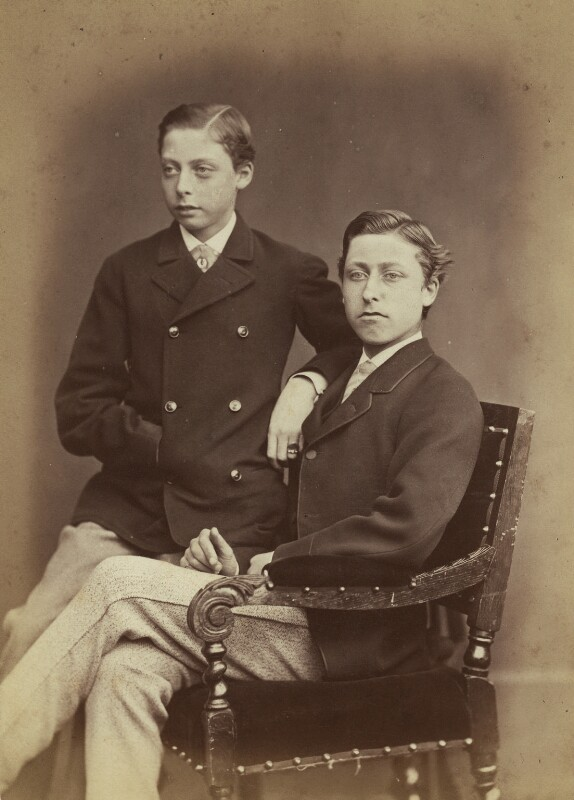
Arthur (sitting right) with his younger brother, Leopold, c. 1866

It was at an early age that Arthur developed an interest in the army, and in 1866 he followed through on his military ambitions by enrolling at the Royal Military Academy, Woolwich, from where he graduated two years later and was commissioned as a lieutenant in the Corps of Royal Engineers on 18 June 1868. The Prince transferred to the Royal Regiment of Artillery on 2 November 1868 and, on 2 August 1869, to the Rifle Brigade, after which he pursued a career as an army officer, including service in South Africa, Canada in 1869, Ireland, Egypt in 1882, and in India from 1886 to 1890.

In Canada, Arthur, as an officer with the Montreal detachment of the Rifle Brigade, undertook a year's training and engaged in defending the Dominion from the Fenian Raids; there was initially concern that his personal involvement in Canada's defence might put the Prince in danger from Fenians and their supporters in the United States, but it was decided his military duty came first. Following his arrival at Halifax, Arthur toured the country for eight weeks and made a visit in January 1870 to Washington, D.C., where he met with President Ulysses S. Grant. During his service in Canada he was also entertained by Canadian society; among other activities, he attended an investiture ceremony in Montreal, was a guest at balls and garden parties, and attended the opening of parliament in Ottawa (becoming the first member of the royal family to do so), all of which was documented in photographs that were sent back for the Queen to view. On 25 May 1870 he was engaged in fending off Fenian invaders during the Battle of Eccles Hill, for which he received the Fenian Medal.

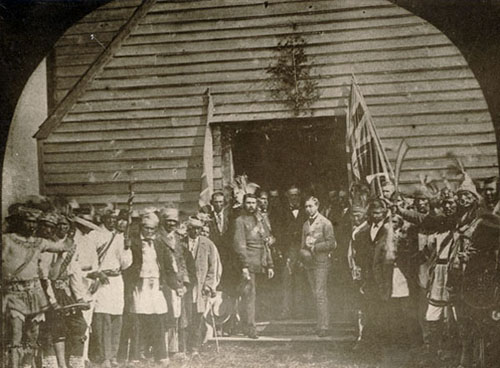
Arthur met with the Chiefs of the Six Nations of the Grand River at the Mohawk Chapel in 1869.

Arthur made an impression on many in Canada. He was given on 1 October 1869 the title Chief of the Six Nations by the Iroquois of the Grand River Reserve in Ontario and the name Kavakoudge (meaning the sun flying from east to west under the guidance of the Great Spirit), enabling him to sit in the tribe's councils and vote on matters of tribe governance. As he became the 51st chief on the council, his appointment broke the centuries-old tradition that there should only be 50 chiefs of the Six Nations. Of the Prince, Lady Lisgar, wife of then Governor General of Canada Lord Lisgar, noted in a letter to Victoria that Canadians seemed hopeful Arthur would one day return as governor general.

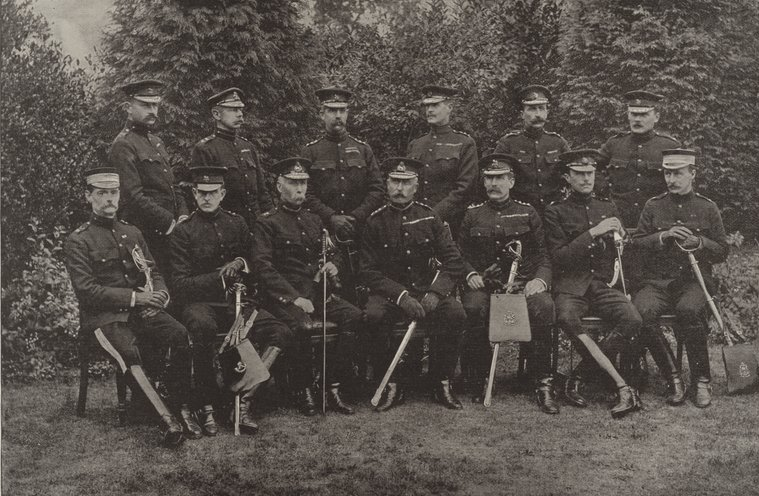
The retirement of the Duke of Connaught, front row centre, from the Aldershot Command, 1898

Arthur was promoted to the honorary rank of colonel on 14 June 1871, substantive lieutenant-colonel in 1876, colonel on 29 May 1880 and, on 1 April 1893, was made a general. He gained military experience as Commander-in-Chief of the Bombay Army from December 1886 to March 1890. He went on to be General officer commanding Southern District, at Portsmouth, from September 1890 to 1893. The Prince had hoped to succeed his first cousin once-removed, the elderly Prince George, Duke of Cambridge, as Commander-in-Chief of the Forces, upon the latter's forced retirement in 1895 but this desire was denied to Arthur; instead he was given, between 1893 and 1898, command of the Aldershot District Command.

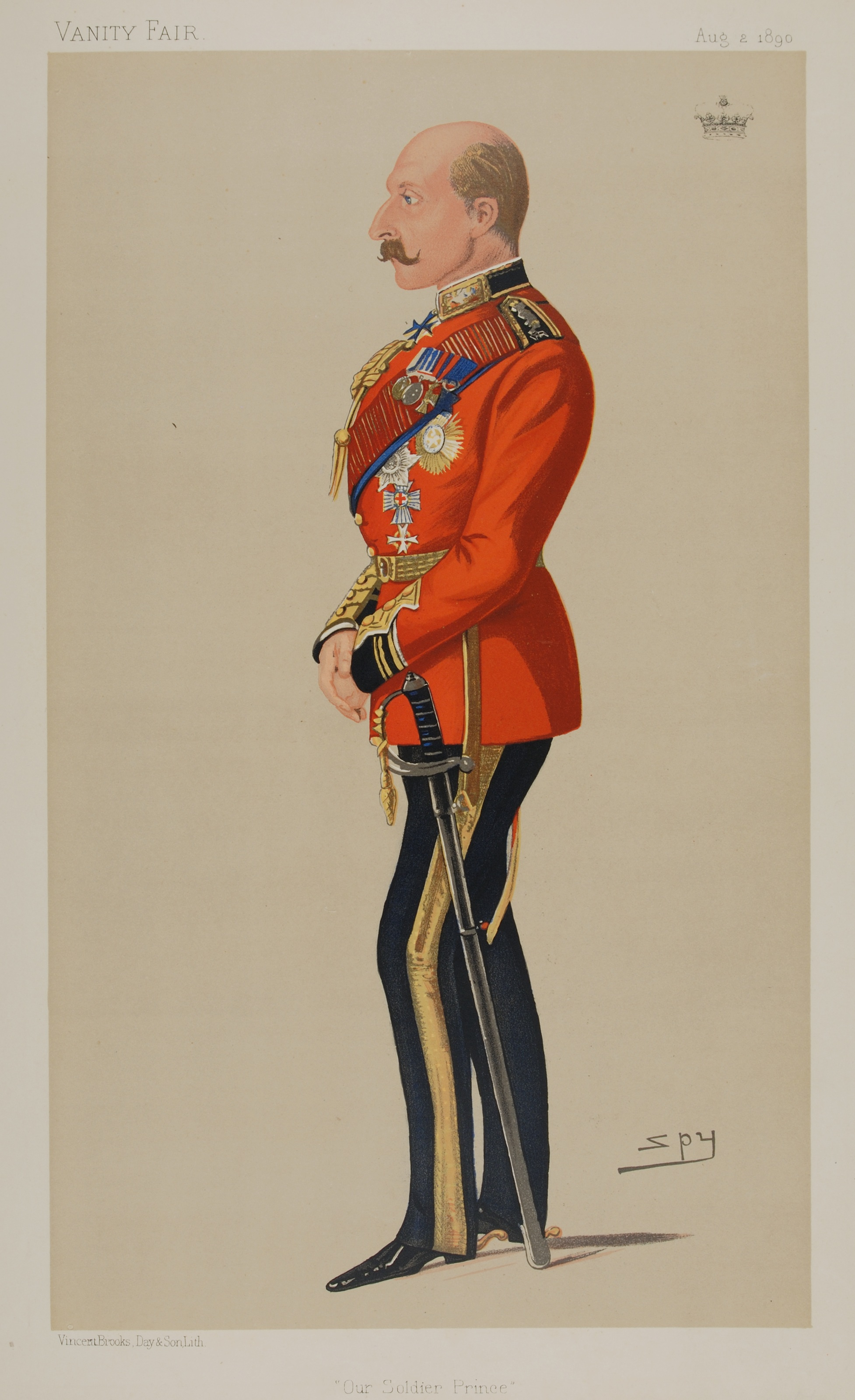
Caricature of the Duke of Connaught in Grenadiers' uniform by Vanity Fair

He was appointed Colonel-in-Chief of the Rifle Brigade in 1880 and of the 6th (Inniskilling) Dragoons in 1897, Honorary Colonel of the Isle of Wight Artillery Militia (later the 'Duke of Connaught's Own') in 1875 and of the 3rd (West Kent Militia) Battalion, Queen's Own (Royal West Kent Regiment) in 1884. In August 1899 the 6th Battalion, Rifles of the Canadian Non-Permanent Active Militia, in Vancouver, British Columbia, also asked Arthur to give his name to the regiment and act as its honorary colonel. The regiment had recently been converted to the infantry role from the 2nd Battalion, 5th British Columbia Regiment of Canadian Artillery. With the Prince's agreement the unit was renamed 6th Regiment, Duke of Connaught's Own Rifles (DCORs) on 1 May 1900. He was subsequently appointed colonel-in-chief of the regiment, then known as The British Columbia Regiment (Duke of Connaught's Own), in 1923. He held that appointment until his death. Additionally, in 1890 he became patron of, giving his name to, the 6th Duke of Connaught's Royal Canadian Hussars, which in 1958 amalgamated with 17th Duke of York's Royal Canadian Hussars, to become the Royal Canadian Hussars.

On 26 June 1902 he was promoted to the post of field marshal, and thereafter served in various positions, including Commander-in-Chief, Ireland, from January 1900 to 1904, with the dual position of commander of the Third Army Corps from October 1901, and Inspector-General of the Forces, between 1904 and 1907.

For a brief period of time, after the May Coup that took place in Serbia in 1903, he was among those considered for the vacant Serbian throne after the extinction of the then ruling Obrenović dynasty. His succession was advocated particularly among the conservative anglophile circles, represented most prominently by Čedomilj Mijatović, then Serbian ambassador to the Court of St James's.

== Peerage, marriage, and family ==
On his mother's birthday (24 May) in 1874, Arthur was created a royal peer, being titled as the Duke of Connaught and Strathearn and Earl of Sussex. Some years later, Arthur came into the direct line of succession to the Duchy of Saxe-Coburg and Gotha in Germany, upon the death in 1899 of his nephew, Prince Alfred of Edinburgh, the only son of his elder brother, Prince Alfred, Duke of Edinburgh. He decided, however, to renounce his own and his son's succession rights to the duchy, which then passed to his other nephew, Prince Charles Edward, the posthumous son of Prince Leopold, Duke of Albany.

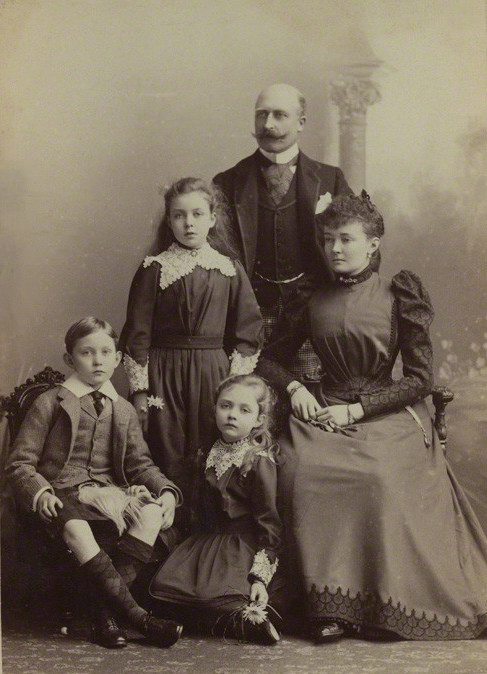
The Duke and Duchess of Connaught with their three children, 1893

At St. George's Chapel, Windsor Castle, on 13 March 1879, Arthur married Princess Louise Margaret of Prussia, the daughter of Prince Frederick Charles and a great-niece of the German Emperor, Arthur's godfather, Wilhelm I. The couple had three children: Princess Margaret Victoria Charlotte Augusta Norah (15 January 1882 – 1 May 1920), Prince Arthur Frederick Patrick Albert (13 January 1883 – 12 September 1938), and Princess Victoria Patricia Helena Elizabeth (17 March 1886 – 12 January 1974), who were all raised at the Connaughts' country home, Bagshot Park, in Surrey, and after 1900 at Clarence House, the Connaughts' London residence. Through his children's marriages, Arthur became the father-in-law of Crown Prince Gustaf Adolf of Sweden; Princess Alexandra, Duchess of Fife; and Sir Alexander Ramsay. The Duke's first two children predeceased him, Margaret while pregnant with her sixth child. (Note: Through Princess Margaret, the reigning monarchs of Sweden and Denmark are descended from the Duke of Connaught and Strathearn.) For many years, Arthur maintained a liaison with Leonie, Lady Leslie, sister of Jennie Churchill, while still remaining outwardly devoted to his wife.

== Royal duties ==
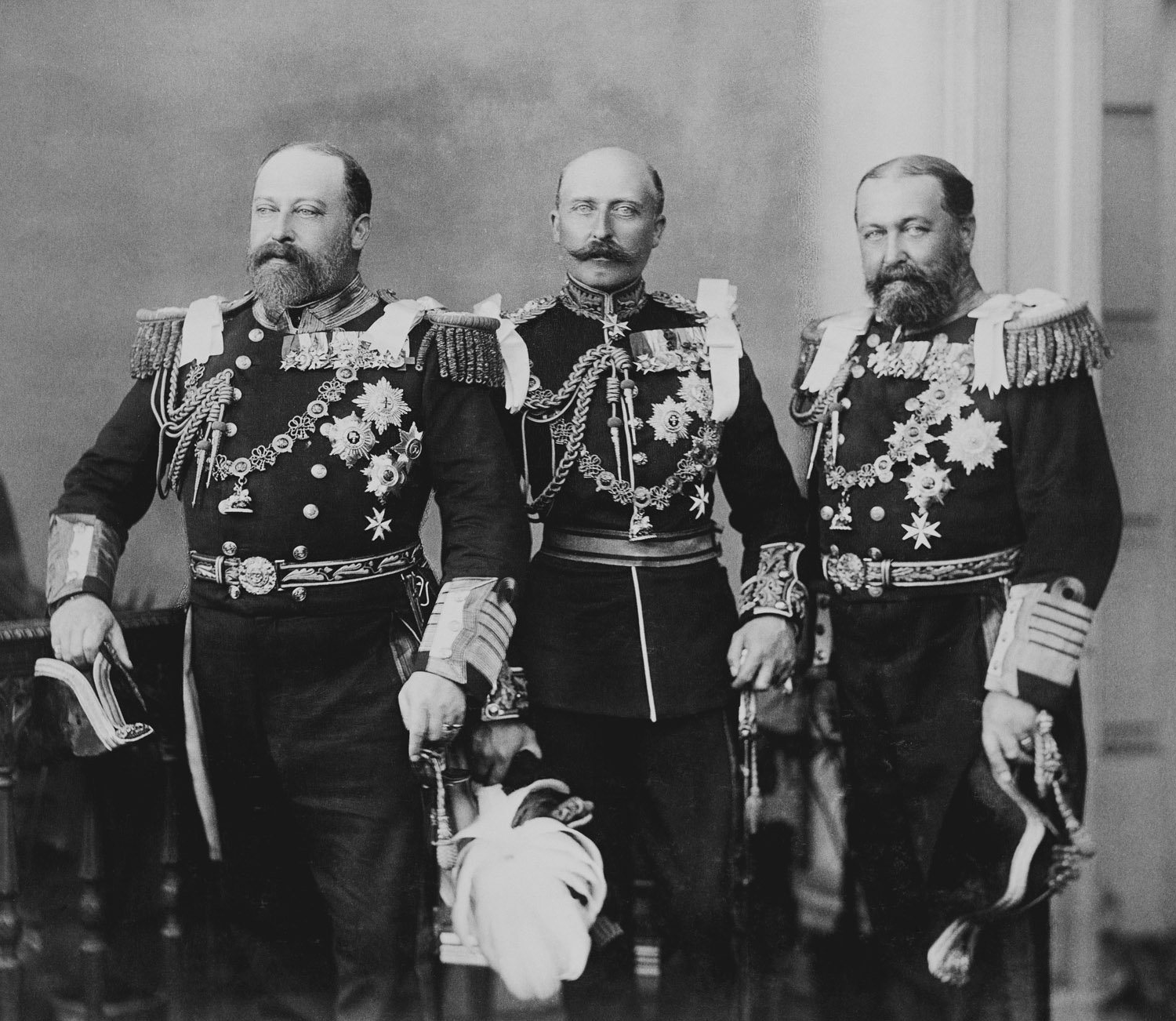
From left to right, the Prince of Wales, Prince Arthur, and Prince Alfred, at the Wedding of the Duke and Duchess of York, 6 July 1893

Alongside his military career, the Duke continued to undertake royal duties beyond, or only vaguely associated with, the army. He also represented the monarchy throughout the Empire. On the return from a posting in India, he again toured Canada in 1890, this time with his wife, stopping in all major cities across the country. He also toured Canada in 1906. In January 1903, the Duke and Duchess represented the new King Edward VII at the 1903 Delhi Durbar to celebrate his accession. On their way to India, the couple passed through Egypt where the Duke opened the Aswan dam on 10 December 1902.

In 1910, Arthur travelled aboard the Union-Castle Line ship Balmoral Castle to South Africa, to open the first parliament of the newly formed Union of South Africa, and in Johannesburg on 30 November, he laid a commemorative stone at the Rand Regiments Memorial, dedicated to the British soldiers who died during the Second Boer War. That same year, he would visit the Canary Islands in December, enjoying the hospitality of the Orotava valley of Tenerife and very briefly visiting the northern tip of Fuerteventura.

Arthur was a Freemason and was elected as Grand Master of the United Grand Lodge of England when his elder brother was obliged to resign the office upon his accession in 1901 as King Edward VII. He was subsequently re-elected an additional 37 times before 1939, when the Prince was nearly 90 years of age.

== Governor General of Canada ==
It was announced on 6 March 1911 that King George V had, by commission under the royal sign-manual, approved the recommendation of his British prime minister, H.H. Asquith, to appoint Arthur as Governor General of Canada, the representative of the monarch. His brother-in-law, John Campbell, 9th Duke of Argyll, had previously served as the country's governor general, but when Arthur was sworn in on 13 October 1911 in the salon rouge of the parliament buildings of Quebec, he became the first Governor General who was a member of the British royal family.

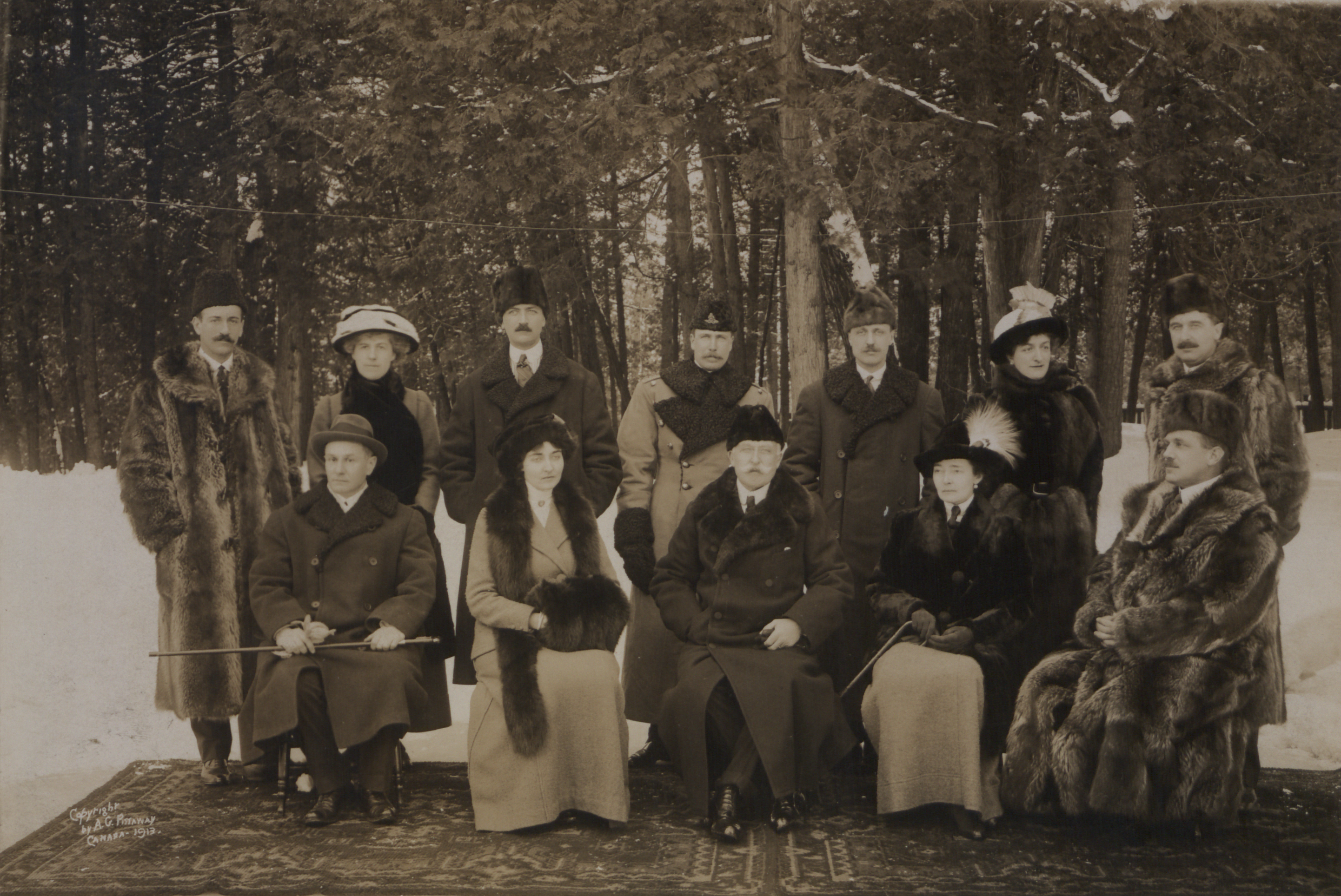
The Duke with his wife, daughter, and staff in 1913. He served as the Governor General of Canada from 1911 to 1916.

To Canada, Arthur brought with him his wife and his younger daughter, the latter of whom would become an extremely popular figure with Canadians. The Governor General and his viceregal family travelled throughout the country, performing such constitutional and ceremonial tasks as opening parliament in 1911 (for which Arthur wore his field marshal's uniform and the Duchess of Connaught wore the gown she had worn at the King's coronation earlier that year) and, in 1917, laying at the newly rebuilt Centre Block on Parliament Hill the same cornerstone his older brother, the late King Edward VII, had set on 1 September 1860, when the original building was under construction. The family crossed the country a number of times and the Governor General made another trip to the United States in 1912, when he met with President William Howard Taft.

When in Ottawa, Connaught maintained a routine of four days each week at his office on Parliament Hill and held small, private receptions for members of all political parties and dignitaries. The Duke learned to ice skate and hosted skating parties at his official residence— Rideau Hall— to which the Connaughts made many physical improvements during Arthur's term as governor general. The royal family also took to camping and other outdoor sports, such as hunting and fishing.

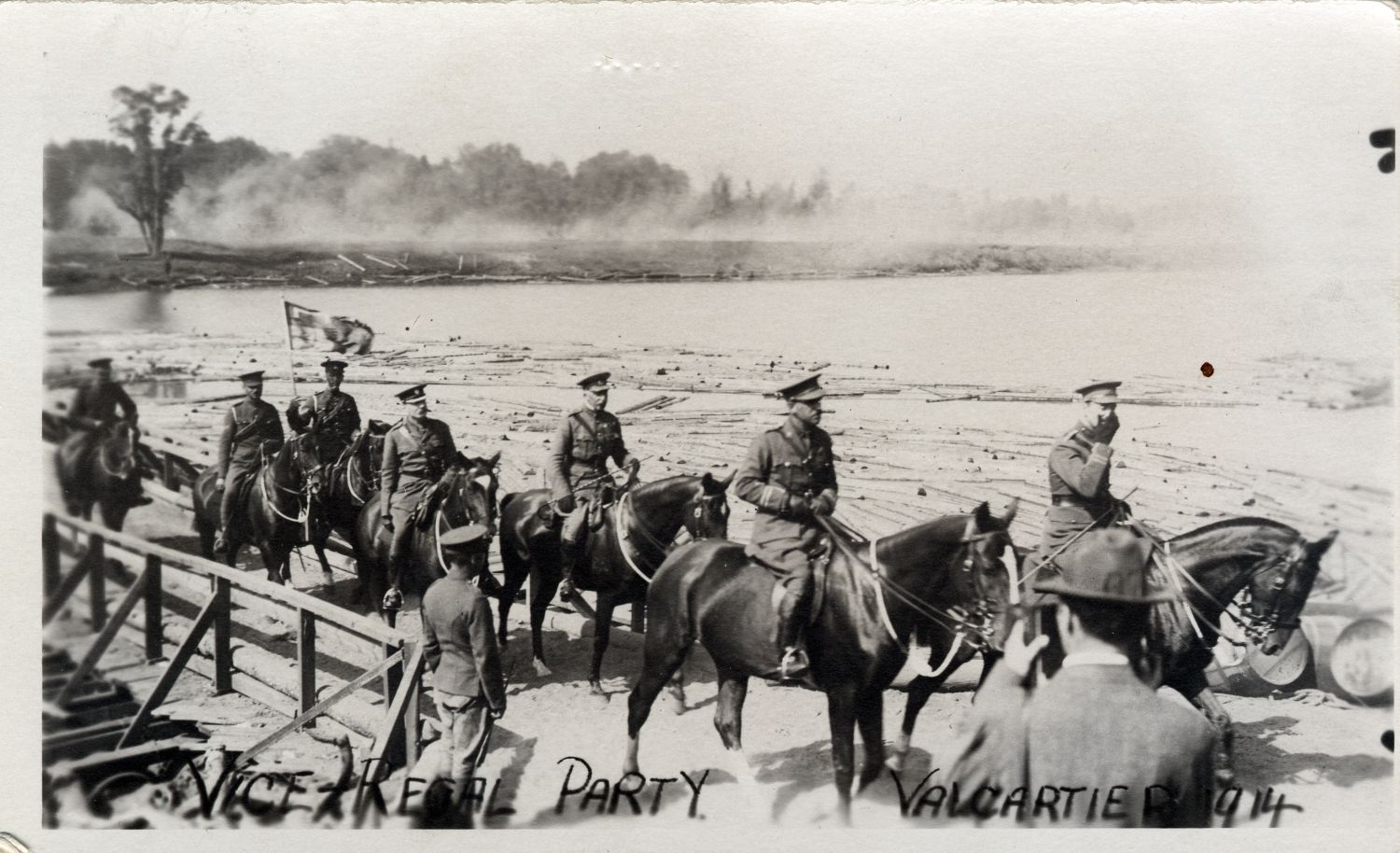
Arthur and his viceregal party visited the Valcartier military base in 1914.

In 1914, the First World War broke out, with Canadians called to arms against Germany and Austria-Hungary. Arthur maintained a wider role in the empire— for instance, from 1912 until his death, serving as Colonel-in-Chief of the Cape Town Highlanders Regiment— but the Connaughts remained in Canada after the beginning of the global conflict, Arthur emphasising the need for military training and readiness for Canadian troops departing for war, and giving his name to the Connaught Cup for the Royal North-West Mounted Police, to encourage pistol marksmanship for recruits. He was also active in auxiliary war services and charities and conducted hospital visits. Though well intended, upon the outbreak of the war, Arthur immediately donned his field marshal's uniform and went, without advice or guidance from his ministers, to training grounds and barracks to address the troops and to see them off before their voyage to Europe. This was much to the chagrin of Prime Minister Robert Borden, who saw the Prince as overstepping constitutional conventions. Borden placed blame on the military secretary, Edward Stanton (whom Borden considered to be "mediocre"), but also opined that Arthur "laboured under the handicap of his position as a member of the royal family and never realised his limitations as Governor General." At the same time, the Duchess of Connaught worked for St John Ambulance, the Red Cross, and other organisations to support the war cause. She was also Colonel-in-Chief of the Duchess of Connaught's Own Irish Canadian Rangers battalion, one of the regiments in the Canadian Expeditionary Force, and Princess Patricia also lent her name and support to the raising of a new Canadian army regiment— Princess Patricia's Canadian Light Infantry.

His term as Canada's Governor General ended in 1916.

Following the war, in memory of Canada's fallen, Arthur commissioned a stained glass window in St. Bartholomew's Church, Ottawa, which the family attended regularly.

== Later life ==
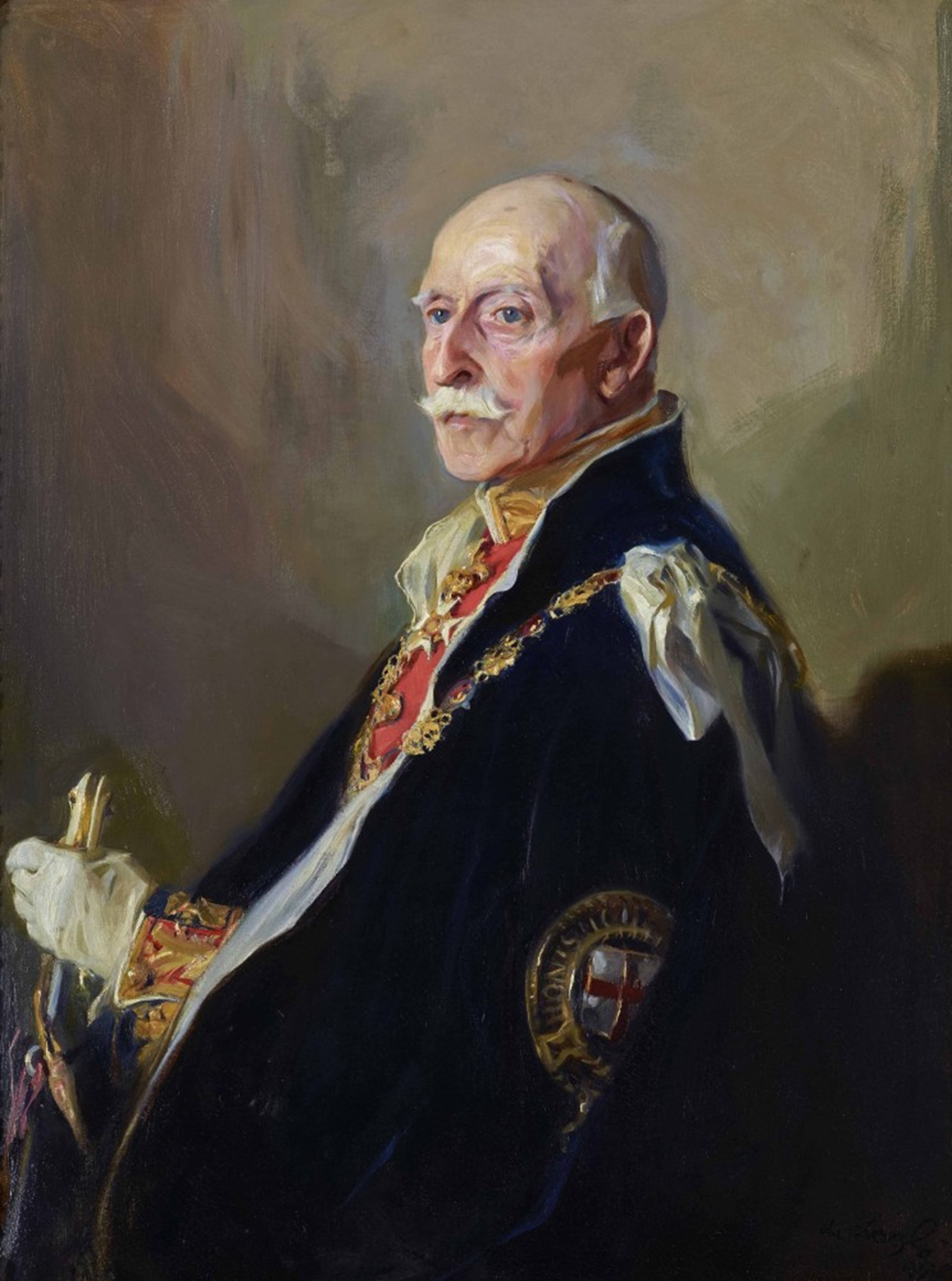
Portrait by Philip de László, 1937

After his years in Canada, the Duke held no similar public offices but undertook a number of public engagements. In 1920, he travelled to South Africa to open Chapman's Peak Drive. The following year he travelled to India, where he officially opened the new Central Legislative Assembly, Council of State, and Chamber of Princes. During his time in India, the Indian National Congress's first satyagraha was ongoing; as part of this, shops were closed and few Indians attended the official ceremonies when he visited Calcutta in the same year. As president of the Boy Scouts Association and one of Lord Baden-Powell's friends and admirers, he performed the official opening of the 3rd World Scout Jamboree at Arrowe Park.

The Duke also returned to military service and continued well into the Second World War, where he was seen as a grandfather figure by aspiring recruits. The Duchess, who had been ill during their years at Rideau Hall, had died in March 1917, and Arthur mostly withdrew from public life in 1928.

== Death ==
At the death of his brother King Edward VII in 1910, the Duke of Connaught became Queen Victoria's last surviving son. By 1941, he was in declining health for several months prior to his death, with failing eyesight and general frailty. He spent much of his final period in seclusion at Bagshot Park, Surrey, attended closely by his daughter, Lady Patricia Ramsay, and his physicians.

Arthur died on 16 January 1942 at Bagshot Park after a bout of bronchitis. At the age of 91 years and 260 days, he was the equal longest-lived of Queen Victoria's children, alongside his elder sister, Princess Louise, Duchess of Argyll, who had died two years and one month before. A funeral service for the Duke was held at St George's Chapel, Windsor Castle, on 23 January, after which his body was placed temporarily in the Royal Vault beneath the chapel. He was reburied on 19 March 1942 in the Royal Burial Ground, Frogmore. His will was sealed in Llandudno after his death in 1942. His estate was valued at £150,677 (or £4.9 million in 2022 when adjusted for inflation).

== Legacy ==
His great-nephew, King Edward VIII, remembered Arthur in his memoirs:

His manners were faultless; his courtesy invested his simplest action with dignity and naturalness. I would not have called him a completely happy man. His family life had not been without sadness. As a younger brother and later the uncle and great-uncle of successive Sovereigns he had always had to play second fiddle in the affairs of the Royal Family. Yet, he never shirked the onerous demands made upon his services. As a sponsor of a multitude of national institutions and undertakings he was a distinguished figure in public life. In his personal philosophy, he was urbane, tolerant and wise. Even when I sometimes found myself in rebellion against some of the things of the world of which he was a part, I nevertheless felt that, while he might not necessarily approve the course I had in mind, he would view it in a sympathetic and understanding light.

== Titles, styles, honours and arms ==
As a member of the royal family and having been a viceroy, Arthur held a number of titles and styles during his life. He was also the recipient of many honours, both domestic and foreign. He was an active member of the military, eventually reaching the rank of field marshal, and served as personal aide-de-camp to four successive sovereigns.

=== Arms ===
Coat of arms of Prince Arthur, Duke of Connaught and Strathearn
Notes Prince Arthur was granted a coat of arms with his dukedom, consisting of the escutcheon of the arms of the sovereign in right of the United Kingdom, with a difference of a label argent, of three points, the first and third bearing fleurs-de-lys azure, and the central a cross gules and an inescutcheon of Saxony. In 1917, the inescutcheon was dropped by royal warrant from King George V. Adopted 1874 Escutcheon Quarterly 1st and 4th gules three lions passant guardant in pale or 2nd or a lion rampant gules within a double tressure flory counterflory gules 3rd azure a harp or stringed argent. Overall differenced by a label of three points argent, the central point charged with a St George's Cross, the points dexter and sinister charged with a Fleur-de-Lis azure. Supporters Dexter a lion rampant gardant or imperially crowned proper, sinister a unicorn argent, armed, crined and unguled or, gorged with a coronet or composed of crosses patée and fleurs de lis a chain affixed thereto passing between the forelegs and reflexed over the back also or. Banner Arthur's banner of arms between 1917 and 1942. (The previous version with the coat of arms of the Royal House of Saxony inescutcheon.) Symbolism As with the Royal Arms of the United Kingdom. The first and fourth quarters are the arms of England, the second of Scotland, the third of Ireland. Previous versions Quarterly 1st and 4th gules three lions passant guardant in pale or 2nd or a lion rampant gules within a double tressure flory counterflory gules 3rd azure a harp or stringed argent. Overall differenced by a label of three points argent, the central point charged with a St George's Cross, the points dexter and sinister charged with a Fleur-de-Lis azure. Until 1917, an inescutcheon of Saxony (for his father). In 1917, inescutcheon of the shield of Saxony was dropped by royal warrant from George V.

== Issue ==
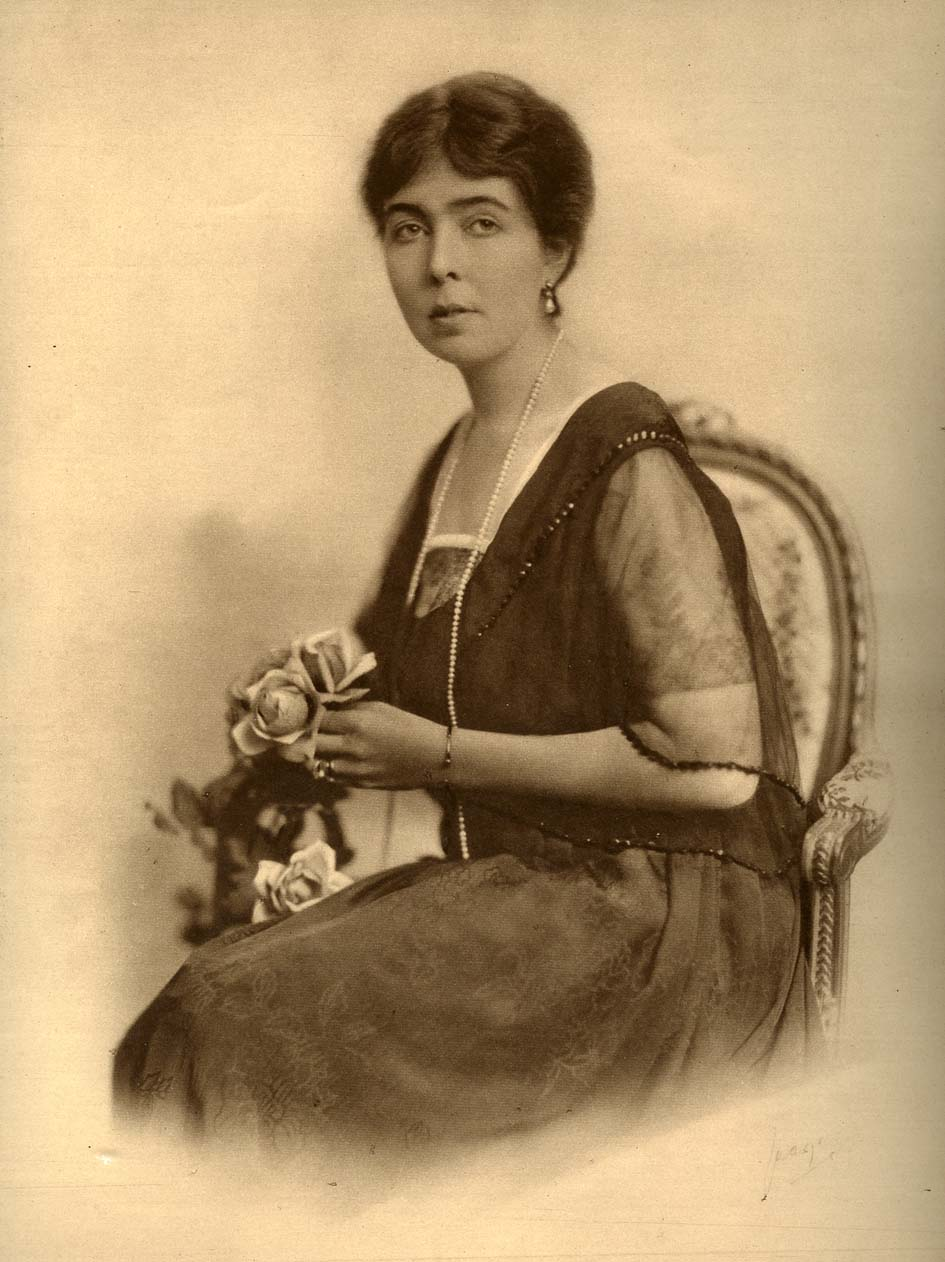
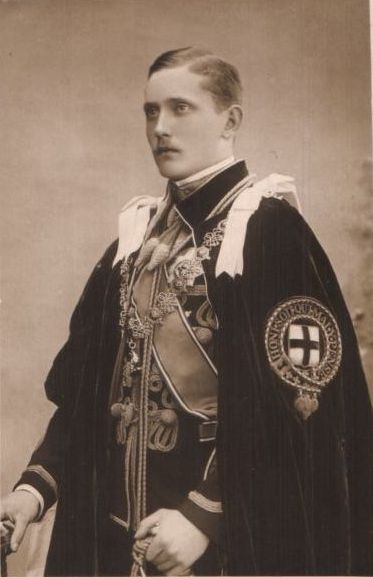
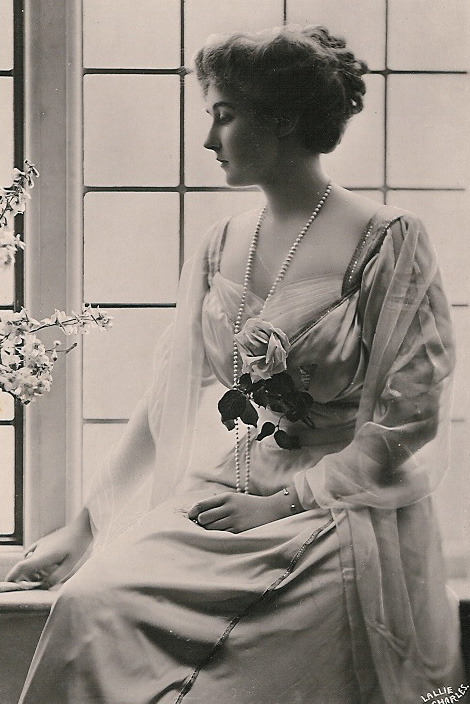
Image	Name	Birth	Death	Notes
	Princess Margaret of Connaught	15 January 1882	1 May 1920	married, 15 June 1905, Crown Prince Gustaf Adolf of Sweden; had issue (including Ingrid, Queen of Denmark).
	Prince Arthur of Connaught	13 January 1883	12 September 1938	married, 15 October 1913, Princess Alexandra, 2nd Duchess of Fife; had issue.
	Princess Patricia of Connaught	17 March 1886	12 January 1974	married, 27 February 1919, Captain Sir Alexander Ramsay, renouncing her title and becoming Lady Patricia Ramsay; had issue.

== Ancestry ==
Ancestors of Prince Arthur, Duke of Connaught and Strathearn

8. Francis, Duke of Saxe-Coburg-Saalfeld
4. Ernest I, Duke of Saxe-Coburg and Gotha
9. Countess Augusta of Reuss-Ebersdorf
2. Prince Albert of Saxe-Coburg and Gotha
10. Augustus, Duke of Saxe-Gotha-Altenburg
5. Princess Louise of Saxe-Gotha-Altenburg
11. Duchess Louise Charlotte of Mecklenburg-Schwerin
1. Prince Arthur, Duke of Connaught and Strathearn
12. George III of the United Kingdom
6. Prince Edward, Duke of Kent and Strathearn
13. Duchess Charlotte of Mecklenburg-Strelitz
3. Victoria of the United Kingdom
14. Francis, Duke of Saxe-Coburg-Saalfeld (= 8)
7. Princess Victoria of Saxe-Coburg-Saalfeld
15. Countess Augusta of Reuss-Ebersdorf (= 9)

== See also ==
- British prince
- Royal dukedoms in the United Kingdom

Named in his honour:

- Port Arthur, a former city in Northern Ontario
- Connaught, a neighbourhood in Calgary, Alberta, Canada
- Connaught Drive, Singapore
- Connaught Place, New Delhi, the commercial centre of India's capital, the epicentre of the imperial Lutyens' Delhi
- Connaught Place, London, at the south end of Edgware Road, very close to the Marble Arch and Hyde Park
- Connaught Road, Hong Kong, a major thoroughfare on the north shore of Hong Kong Island.

== Notes ==
Prince Arthur, Duke of Connaught and Strathearn House of Saxe-Coburg and Gotha later House of Windsor Cadet branch of the House of Wettin Born: 1 May 1850 Died: 16 January 1942
Government offices
Preceded by The Earl Grey	Governor General of Canada; 1911–1916	Succeeded by The Duke of Devonshire
Military offices
Preceded by Sir Charles Arbuthnot	C-in-C, Bombay Army; 1886–1890	Succeeded by Sir George Greaves
Preceded by Sir Leicester Smyth	GOC Southern District; 1890–1893	Succeeded by Sir John Davis
Preceded by Sir Evelyn Wood	GOC-in-C Aldershot Command; 1893–1898	Succeeded by Sir Redvers Buller
Preceded by The Lord Roberts of Kandahar	Commander-in-Chief, Ireland; 1900–1904	Succeeded by The Lord Grenfell
New post	Inspector-General of the Forces; 1904–1907	Succeeded by Sir John French
Preceded by New post	Field Marshal Commanding-in-Chief, Mediterranean; 1907–1909	Succeeded by Sir Frederick Forestier-Walker
Preceded by Sir William Thomas Knollys	Colonel of the Scots Guards; 1883–1904	Succeeded by The Lord Methuen
Preceded by The Duke of Cambridge	Colonel of the Grenadier Guards; 1904–1942	Succeeded by Princess Elizabeth
Honorary titles
Preceded by The Prince of Wales	Great Master of the Order of the Bath; 1901–1942	Succeeded by The Duke of Gloucester
Preceded by The Earl of Ducie	Senior Privy Counsellor; 1921–1942	Succeeded by The Duke of Portland
Masonic offices
Preceded by The Prince of Wales	Grand Master of the United Grand Lodge of England; 1901–1939	Succeeded by The Duke of Kent
Peerage of the United Kingdom
New creation	Duke of Connaught and Strathearn; 1874–1942	Succeeded by Alastair Windsor
