= Inspector-General of the Forces =

Former senior British Army officer

Inspector-General of the Forces was a British Army appointment. There were also Inspectors-General for the different arms.

== Inspector-General of the Forces ==
The post was created to review and report on the training and efficiency of units of the British Army under the control of the Home Government (i.e. excluding the Army of India). In 1910 the scope of the Inspector-General was limited to the troops in the United Kingdom, and the General Officer Commanding in the Mediterranean was appointed Inspector-General of forces overseas.

- 2 March 1904: Prince Arthur, Duke of Connaught and Strathearn
- 21 December 1907: Sir John French
- 1 March 1912: Sir Charles Douglas (as Inspector-General of the Home Forces)
- 1 August 1914: Sir John French

On the outbreak of the First World War the post was redesignated Commander-in-Chief, Home Army.

=== Inspector-General of Oversea Forces ===
- 1 August 1910: Sir Ian Hamilton, to July 1914
- 1 July 1939: Sir Edmund Ironside, to 3 September 1939

=== Inspector-General of Home Defences ===
- 1 July 1939: Sir Walter Kirke

On the outbreak of the Second World War Kirke was appointed Commander-in-Chief, Home Forces.
