= List of British Commands and Army groups =

This is a list of British Army commands and army groups. It is intended as a central point of access information about British formations of that size. It does not cover formations of the British Indian Army.

In 1905, the army established a series of geographical military districts, known as "commands", to replace six army corps that had existed for a short period. Among the new commands was Aldershot Command. The purpose of the commands was to administer all units and formations located within their geographical borders, and if needed could be further subdivided into "areas". In 1939, it was one of the army's six regional commands, which existed within the British Isles, on the outbreak of the Second World War. Its geographical area encompassed parts of the following four counties: Berkshire, Hampshire, Surrey, and Sussex.

Commands were placed under the control of a general officer commanding who was assisted by an assortment of staff officers, which were subdivided between the General Staff, the Adjutant-General, the Quartermaster-General, as well as the Royal Artillery, Royal Engineers, Royal Corps of Signals, Royal Army Medical Corps, and various other regiments and corps.

== List ==
- Aldershot Command (until 1941)
- Anti-Aircraft Command
- Army Strategic Command (1968–1972)
- British Army of the Rhine (1945–1994)
- British Element Trieste Force (BETFOR)
- British Expeditionary Force (World War I)
- British Expeditionary Force (World War II)
- British Forces in Austria (ex Eighth Army)
- Cyrenaica Command (1940–1941)
- East Africa Command (1941–1964)
- Eastern Command
- Far East Land Forces
- Field Army (c. 2015–present)
- Home Command
- Land Command (1995–2008)
- Land Forces (2008–2011)
- Malaya Command
- HQ Malta and Libya (until at least 1967)
- Mediterranean Command (1907–1914)
- Middle East Command (1939–1945)
- Middle East Land Forces (1945–1976)
- Near East Land Forces
- Netherlands East Indies Command (c. 1946–1947)
- Northern Command
- HQ Northern Ireland
- Persia and Iraq Command
- Scottish Command
- South Eastern Command (1941–1944)
- Southern Command (until 1972)
- United Kingdom Land Forces (1972–1995)
- United Kingdom Support Command (Germany)
- West Africa Command (1941–1956)
- Western Command

== Army Groups ==
- 11th Army Group (activated in November 1943; on 12 November 1944 redesignated Allied Land Forces South East Asia)
- 15th Army Group
- 18th Army Group
- 21st Army Group
- Allied Armies in Italy
