= Stella Wolfe Murray =

British journalist and writer

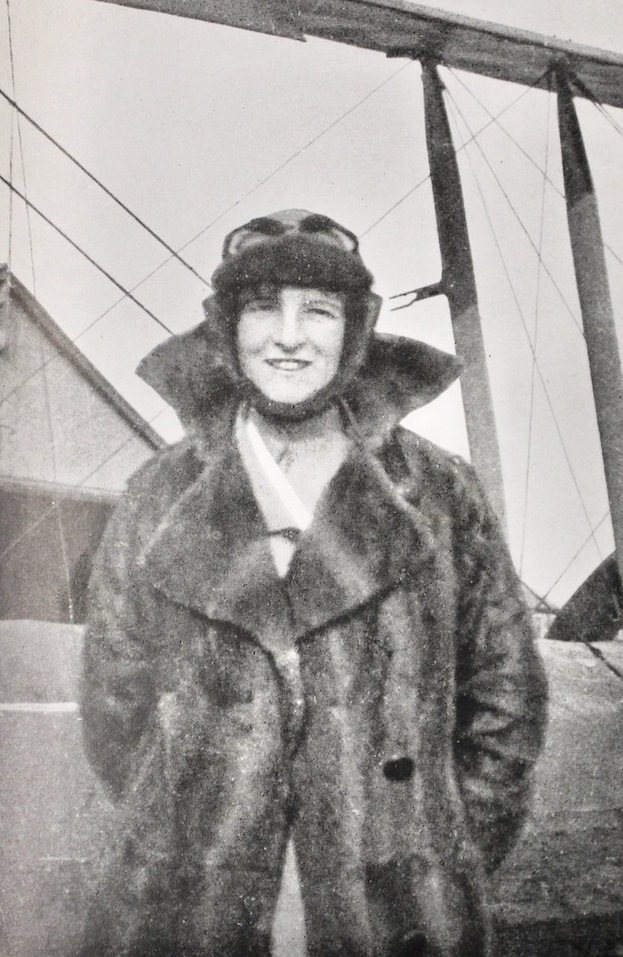
- in 1920
- Born: 7 October 1886; India
- Died: August 1935 (aged 48); Switzerland
- Known for: Journalist, writer

Stella Wolfe Murray (7 October 1886 – August 1935) was a British journalist and writer. In 1924 she became the first woman Lobby correspondent.

== Biography ==
Stella Wolfe Murray was born on 7 October 1886 at Madras (now Chennai), India. She was the daughter of Francis D'Arcy Osborne Wolfe-Murray (a judge in the Indian Civil Service) and Frances Henrietta Morgan of an old military family. Her uncle was Lt General James Wolfe-Murray. She was educated at the Eastbourne Ladies College. During the First World War she was a nurse at a French hospital, then worked for the Ministry of Munitions, the War Office and the Imperial War Museum before becoming a journalist.

Stella Wolfe Murray reported for the Daily Sketch, ran her own women's 'News and Views' column that featured in the Leeds Mercury and also wrote 'Women's Topics' for the Sheffield Independent. Murray became Lobby correspondent for the Leeds Mercury in 1924. They announced her employment on Tuesday 2 December 1924, stating that “The Leeds Mercury has always taken a pride in stating fairly all points of view in public life”.

Murray was an enthusiastic air passenger, and the only press representative on Imperial Airways first flight to Egypt. She conceived of, cowrote and coedited Woman and Flying. Woman and Flying was written with aviator Lady Mary Heath who was the first person to fly from Cape Town to London. In April 1924 the International Commission for Air Navigation passed a regulation banning women from operating commercial aircraft. Lady Heath worked with Stella Wolfe Murray to challenge the resolution, which was detailed in their book. In the summer of 1926 the regulation was rescinded. Murray also wrote The Poetry of Flight: An Anthology as well as other articles relating to flying. She was the only Press Correspondent on the first Imperial Airways flight to Egypt.

In her newspaper columns Murray covered topics from stove-top cooking, to the new Factories Act and equal pay. She specialised in serious news of women's professional and industrial activities, including articles on 'Sheffield's one policewoman' to 'Yorkshire's women engineers'. Murray reported on the reaction to MP Ellen Wilkinson's choice of a bright green dress for an early parliamentary appearance and reminded her readers that ‘it is the woman herself that matters rather than her covering’.

Stella Wolfe Murray was a member of the Women's Freedom League.

== Family ==
She married newspaper editor Philip Francis Sulley on 3 January 1929 in London. She died in Vevey Switzerland after "a long illness"

== Selected works ==
- Emily Forster, Stella Wolfe Murray, A.C. Marshall, N.W. Fraser, Lloyd's ABC of Careers for Girls (London: 1922)
- Stella Wolfe Murray, The Poetry of Flight: An Anthology (London: Heath Cranton Limited, 1925)
- Stella Wolfe Murray, 'London to Cairo by Air' in Airways "The Only Air Travel Magazine" (Harrison and Sons, September 1926 to August 1927)
- Lady Mary Heath and Stella Wolfe Murray, Woman and Flying (London: John Long 1929)
