= Central Force =

Home command of the British Army during First World War, based in London

GHQ Central Force was a home command of the British Army during the First World War.

Central Force, based in London, was formed on 5 August 1914 under Sir Ian Hamilton, who had the title of Commander-in-Chief Home Army. This was a retitling of the post of Inspector-General of the Home Forces and did not imply command over all forces based in Great Britain. Central Force supported the British Expeditionary Force in France and was responsible for Territorial Force troops charged with coastal defence. Subordinate formations were First Army based at Bedford, Second Army at Aldershot (later at Tunbridge Wells) and Third Army at Luton. Also attached to Central Force were the 1st and 2nd Mounted Divisions, the West Riding Division and the Northumbrian Division.

Sir Leslie Rundle became C-in-C Home Army in March 1915 when Hamilton left to take command of the Mediterranean Expeditionary Force. GHQ Central Force was redesignated as GHQ Home Forces in December 1915 when Sir John French was appointed Commander-in-Chief, Home Forces.
