= Esher Committee =

1904 British report on military reforms

The Esher Report of 1904, issued by a committee chaired by Lord Esher, recommended radical reform of the British Army, such as the creation of an Army Council, General Staff and Chief of the General Staff and the abolition of the Commander-in-Chief of the Forces.

The change to the character of the Army has endured.

== Background ==
The Second Boer War of 1899-1902 exposed weakness and inefficiency in the British Army and demonstrated how isolated Britain was from the rest of the world. The war had been won only by leaving Britain defenceless on land. In 1900, Imperial Germany began to build a battlefleet and industrial growth had already made it challenge Britain's economic lead in Europe.

The Elgin Commission had already advocated some changes in administration. Under Hugh Oakeley Arnold-Forster at the War Office the Report of the War Office (Reconstitution) Committee was set up to look into reform of the Army. It was chaired by Lord Esher, who had been a member of the Elgin Commission, and had two other members; Admiral Sir John Fisher (the naval Commander-in-Chief, Portsmouth, and a former Controller of the Navy and Second Sea Lord), and Colonel Sir George Clarke. The Esher Report was published, successively, in February and March 1904.

== Conclusions ==
The Committee took evidence in private and its Report was in three parts. It analysed the complex arrangements and inefficiencies of the Army administration and made three main recommendations:

- an Army Council modelled on the Board of Admiralty. It was designed as a single collective body to analyse and decide upon issues connected to policy and so end the confusion of the responsibilities of the Secretary of State for War, the Adjutant-General and the Quartermaster General. The War Secretary was to have the same power as the First Lord of the Admiralty and all military topics submitted to the Crown would go through him. That would increase civil and parliamentary control over the Army. Also recommended was that the Council would be made up of seven members. These were to be the Secretary of State for War, the First Military Member (with responsibility for operations and military policy), the Second Military Member (with responsibility for recruitment and discipline), the Third Military Member (with responsibility for supply and transport), the Fourth Military Member (with responsibility for armaments and fortifications), a Civil Member (who would be the Parliamentary Under-Secretary with responsibility for civil business other than finance) and another Civil Member (the Financial Secretary). It was recommended that this Council should meet frequently and decide matters by majority vote.
- a General Staff with its Chief having the responsibility for preparing the Army for war. The post of Commander-in-Chief of the Forces was to be abolished. The duties of the General Staff were to be shared by a Director of Military Operations, a Director of Staff Duties and a Director of Military Training.
- the War Office was to be radically reorganised on rational grounds. The British Army had previously grown since 1660 by not grand design but piecemeal additions and reforms. The administration inside the War Office was to be divided between the Chief of the General Staff, the Adjutant-General, the Quartermaster-General and the Master-General of the Ordnance. The Adjutant-General was given overall responsibility for the welfare and maintenance of the soldiers. Under him would be a Director of Recruiting and Organisation, a Director of Personal Services, a Director-General of Medical Services and a Director of Auxiliary Services. The previous office of Judge-Advocate-General was to be replaced with a Judge-Advocate with more limited power. Apart from manufacture, all parts of the process of material supply would be put under the Quartermaster-General. His department subordinates would be a Director of Transport and Remounts, a Director of Movements and Quartering, a Director of Supplies and Clothing and an Equipment and Ordnance Stores. The Master-General of the Ordnance's subordinates would be a Director of Artillery, a Naval Adviser and a Director of Fortifications and Works.

That rationalisation was recommended by the Report to be implemented throughout the Army. The Report also claimed that policy and administration had become too centralised in the War Office, to the detriment of initiative. Administrative districts were recommended to be responsible for organisation to leave commanders of field units free to train for war.

== Publication ==
King Edward VII welcomed the Report and successfully urged the Arthur James Balfour's government to accept its recommendations. However, some in the Army were wary of its recommendations, one opponent being Lord Kitchener. Richard Haldane, who became War Secretary for Henry Campbell-Bannerman's government in 1905, implemented many of its recommendations between 1906 and 1909. Among his advisers was General Sir Gerard Ellison, who was also Secretary of the Esher Committee.

The recommendations were to form the basis of Army reform for the next 60 years. The military historian Correlli Barnett wrote that the Esher Report's importance "and its consequences can hardly be exaggerated.... Without the Esher Report... it is inconceivable that the mammoth British military efforts of two world wars could have been possible, let alone so generally successful."

== Sources ==
- Barnett, Correlli (1970). Britain and Her Army, 1509 –1970. Cassell.
- Dunlop, J. K. (1938). The Development of the British Army 1899 –1914. Methuen.
- Heffer, Simon (1999). Power and Place: The Political Consequences of King Edward VII. Weidenfeld & Nicolson.
- Brett, Oliver (1923–1936). The Letters and Journals of Reginald Brett, Viscount Esher. Vol. 6/6. Hodder & Stoughton.
- Fraser, Peter (1973). Life and Times of Reginald, Viscount Brett. Macmillan.
