= Sir Henry Wilson, 1st Baronet =

British Army officer (1864–1922)

Field Marshal Sir Henry Wilson Bt GCB DSO
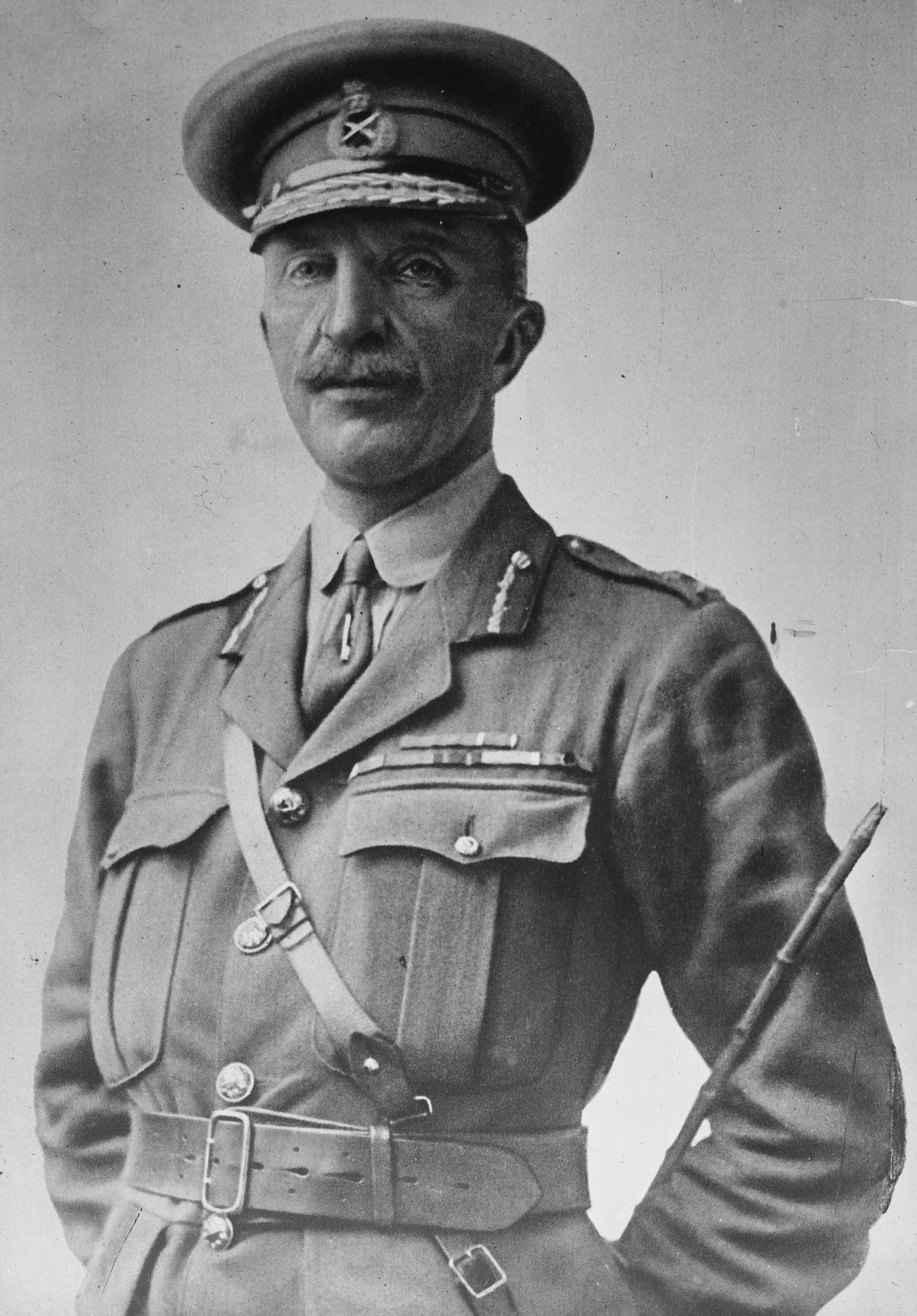
- Born: Henry Hughes Wilson; 5 May 1864; Ballinalee, County Longford, Ireland
- Died: 22 June 1922 (aged 58); Belgravia, London, England
- Cause of death: Assassination by gunshot
- Military career
- Allegiance: United Kingdom
- Branch: British Army
- Service years: 1882–1922
- Rank: Field Marshal
- Commands: Chief of the Imperial General Staff; Eastern Command; IV Corps; Staff College, Camberley; 9th Provisional Battalion, Rifle Brigade
- Conflicts: Third Anglo-Burmese War; Second Boer War; First World War
- Awards: Knight Grand Cross of the Order of the Bath; Companion of the Distinguished Service Order; Mentioned in Despatches; Légion d'honneur (France); Order of Leopold (Belgium); Croix de guerre (Belgium); Order of Chia-Ha (China); Distinguished Service Medal (United States); Order of the White Elephant (Siam); Order of the Rising Sun (Japan); Order of the Redeemer (Greece)

Member of Parliament for North Down
- In office 21 February 1922 – 22 June 1922
- Preceded by: Thomas Watters Brown
- Succeeded by: John Simms

Field Marshal Sir Henry Hughes Wilson, 1st Baronet (5 May 1864 – 22 June 1922) was one of the most senior British Army staff officers of the First World War and an Irish unionist politician. He served as commandant of the Staff College, Camberley, and then as director of military operations at the War Office. Wilson played a vital role in drawing up plans to deploy an expeditionary force to France in the event of war. He acquired a reputation as a political intriguer for his role in agitating for the introduction of conscription and the Curragh incident of 1914.

As sub chief of staff to the British Expeditionary Force (BEF), Wilson was Sir John French's most important advisor during the 1914 campaign, but his poor relations with Douglas Haig and William Robertson saw him sidelined from top decision-making in the middle years of the war. He played an important role in Anglo-French military relations in 1915 and – after his only experience of field command as a corps commander in 1916 – as an ally of the controversial French General Robert Nivelle in early 1917. Later in 1917 he was informal military advisor to British Prime Minister David Lloyd George and then British Permanent Military Representative at the Supreme War Council at Versailles.

In 1918 Wilson served as Chief of the Imperial General Staff (the professional head of the British Army). He continued to hold this position after the war, a time when the Army was being sharply reduced in size whilst attempting to contain industrial unrest in the UK and nationalist unrest in Iraq and Egypt. He also played an important role in the Irish War of Independence.

After retiring from the army Wilson served briefly as a member of parliament and as security advisor to the Northern Ireland government. He was assassinated by two IRA gunmen in 1922.

== Family background ==
The Wilson family arrived in Carrickfergus with William of Orange in 1690. They prospered, as Ulster Protestants, in the Belfast shipping business in the late eighteenth and early 19th century and, following the Incumbered Estates (Ireland) Act 1849, became landowners. Wilson's father James, the youngest of four sons, inherited Currygrane in Ballinalee (1,200 acres, worth £835 in 1878). James Wilson served as a high sheriff, a justice of the peace and deputy lieutenant for Longford, and attended Trinity College Dublin. As late as the 1960s the IRA leader Seán Mac Eoin remembered the Wilsons as having been fair landlords and employers. The Wilsons also owned Frescati House, an eighteenth-century house at Blackrock, Dublin.

Born at Currygrane, Henry Wilson was the second of James and Constant Wilson's four sons (he also had three sisters). He attended Marlborough public school between September 1877 and Easter 1880, before leaving for a crammer to prepare for the Army. One of Wilson's younger brothers also became an army officer and the other a land agent.

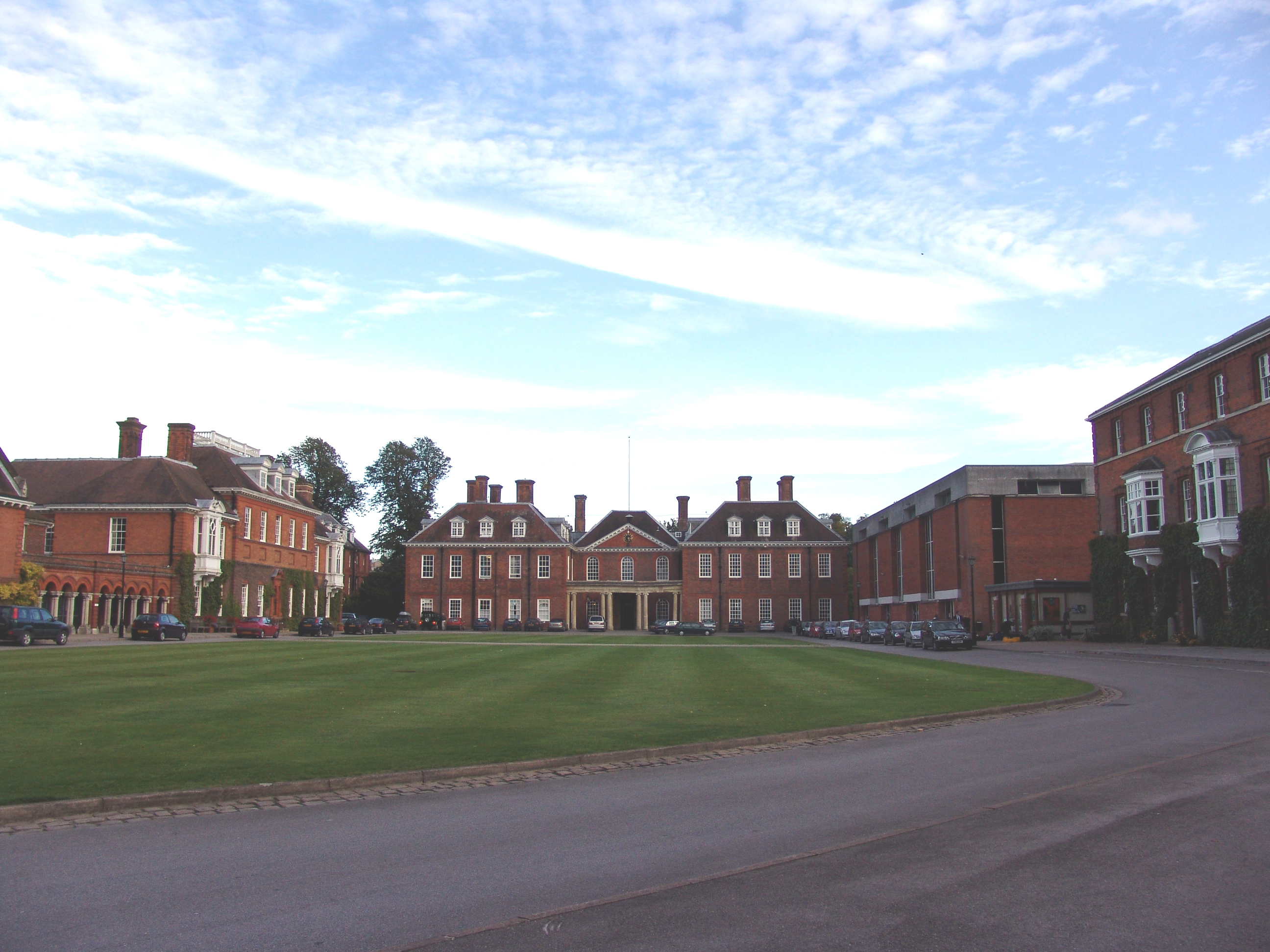
Marlborough College, which Wilson attended as a boy

Wilson spoke with an Irish accent and at times regarded himself as British, Irish or an Ulsterman. His biographer Keith Jeffery suggests that he may well, like many Anglo-Irish, have played up his "Irishness" in England and regarded himself as more "Anglo-" while in Ireland, and may well also have agreed with his brother Jemmy's view that Ireland was not "homogenous" enough to be "a Nation." Wilson was a devout member of the Church of Ireland, and on occasion attended Catholic services, but disliked "Romish" ritual.

== Early career ==
=== Junior officer ===
Between 1881 and 1882 Wilson made several unsuccessful attempts to get into the British Army officer-training establishments: two to enter the Royal Military Academy, Woolwich and three for the Royal Military College, Sandhurst. The entrance examinations relied heavily on rote learning. John Fortescue later claimed that this was because as a tall boy he needed "time for his brain to develop".

Wilson acquired his commission "by the back door", as it was then known, by first becoming a militia officer. In December 1882 he joined the 6th (Royal Longford Militia) Battalion, Rifle Brigade. He also trained with the 5th Battalion, Royal Munster Fusiliers. After two periods of training he was eligible to apply for a regular commission, and after further cramming in the winter of 1883–84, and trips to Algiers and Darmstadt to learn French and German, he sat the Army exam in July 1884. He was commissioned into the Royal Irish Regiment, but soon transferred into the more prestigious Rifle Brigade.

Early in 1885 Wilson was posted with the 1st Battalion of the Rifle Brigade to India, where he took up polo and big game hunting. In November 1886 he was posted to the Upper Irawaddy, just south of Mandalay, in recently annexed Burma to take part in the Third Burmese War, whose counter-insurgency operations in the Arakan Hills became known as "the subalterns' war". The British troops were organised into mounted infantry, accompanied by "Goorkha police". Wilson worked with Henry Rawlinson of the King's Royal Rifle Corps (KRRC), who described him in his diary as "a very good chap". On 5 May 1887 he was wounded above the left eye. The wound did not heal and after six months in Calcutta he spent almost the whole of 1888 recuperating in Ireland until he was passed fit for regimental duty. He was left disfigured. His wound earned him the nicknames "Ugly Wilson" and "the ugliest man in the British Army".

=== Marriage ===
While in Ireland Wilson began courting Cecil Mary Wray, who was two years his senior. Her family, who had come over to Ireland late in Elizabeth I's reign, had owned an estate called Ardamona near Lough Eske, Donegal, the profitability of which had never recovered from the Great Famine of Ireland of the 1840s. On 26 December 1849 two kegs of explosive were set off outside the house, after which the family only ever spent one more winter there. From 1850 Cecil's father George Wray had worked as a land agent, latterly for the Earl of Drogheda's estates in Kildare, until his death in 1878. Cecil grew up in straitened circumstances, and her views on Irish politics appear to have been rather more hardline than her husband's. They were married on 3 October 1891.

The Wilsons were childless. Wilson lavished affection on their pets (including a dog "Paddles") and other people's children. They gave a home to the young 8th Earl of Guilford in 1895–1896 and Cecil's niece Leonora ("Little Trench") from December 1902.

=== Staff College ===
While contemplating marriage, Wilson began to study for the Staff College, Camberley, in 1888, possibly as attendance at Staff College was not only cheaper than service with a smart regiment but also opened up the possibility of promotion. At this time Wilson had a private income of £200 a year from a £6,000 trust fund. At the end of 1888 Wilson was passed fit for home (but not overseas) service, and joined the 2nd battalion at Dover early in 1889. Wilson was elected to White's in 1889.

After a posting to Aldershot, Wilson was posted to Belfast in May 1890. In May 1891 he passed 15th (out of 25) into Staff College. French and German were amongst his worst subjects, and he began study there in January 1892. After his difficulty in entering the Army, passing the entrance exam proved that he did not lack brains.

Colonel Henry Hildyard became Staff College commandant in August 1893, beginning a reform of the institution, placing more emphasis on continuous assessment (including outdoor exercises) rather than examinations. Wilson also studied under Colonel George Henderson. Whilst at the College he visited the battlefields of the Franco-Prussian War in March 1893. Rawlinson and Thomas D'Oyly Snow were often his study partners. Rawlinson and Wilson became close friends, often staying and socialising together, and Rawlinson introduced Wilson to Lord Roberts in May 1893, whilst both men were working on a scheme for the defence of India. Wilson became a protégé of Roberts.

=== Staff officer ===
Wilson graduated from Staff College in December 1893 and was immediately promoted captain. He was due to be posted with the 3rd Battalion to India early in 1894, but after extensive and unsuccessful lobbying he obtained a medical postponement. He then learned that he was to join the 1st Battalion in Hong Kong for two years, but swapped with another captain. There is no clear evidence as to why Wilson was so keen to avoid overseas service. Charles à Court Repington, then a staff captain in the Intelligence Section at the War Office, took Wilson on a tour of French military and naval installations in July. After a very brief service with his regiment in September, with Repington's help Wilson came to work at the War Office in November 1894, initially as an unpaid assistant, then succeeding to Repington's own job. Wilson worked there for three years from November 1894. From November 1895 Wilson found time to assist Rawlinson with his "Officer's Note Book" based on a previous book by Lord Wolseley, and which inspired the official "Field Service Pocket Book".

Wilson worked in Section A (France, Belgium, Italy, Spain, Portugal and Latin America). In April 1895, despite intensive tutoring of up to three hours most days, he failed an exam in German for a posting to Berlin. On 5 May 1895, he took over from Repington as staff captain of section A, making him the youngest staff officer in the British Army. His duties took him to Paris (June 1895, to inquire about the expedition to Borgu on the Upper Niger) and Brussels. In January 1896 he seemed likely to be appointed brigade major of the 2nd Brigade at Aldershot if the current incumbent, John Cowans, a notorious womaniser with a penchant for "rough trade", resigned, although in the event this did not happen until early September.

== Boer War ==
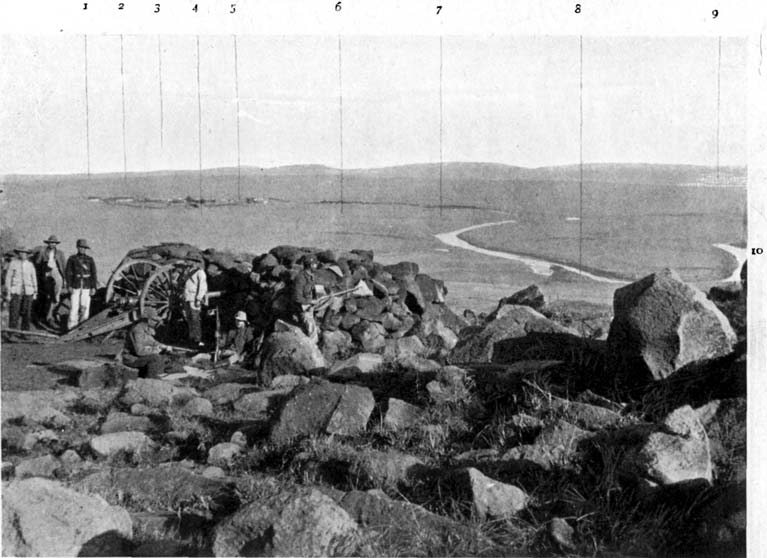
The Battle of Colenso, at which Wilson saw action, during the Second Boer War

Believing war with the Transvaal "very likely" from spring 1897, Wilson canvassed for a place in any expeditionary force. That spring he helped Major H. P. Northcott, head of the British Empire section in the Intelligence Division, draw up a plan "for knocking Kruger's head off". Leo Amery later claimed that Wilson and Lieutenant Dawnay helped Roberts draw up what would become his eventual plan for invading the Boer republics from the west. He received a medal for riding in Queen Victoria's Diamond Jubilee procession, but regretted that he had not won a war medal. To his regret, and unlike his friend Rawlinson, Wilson missed out on a posting to the 1898 Sudan Expedition. When tensions mounted again in the summer of 1899, Wilson was appointed brigade major of the 3rd brigade, now renamed the 4th or "Light" brigade at Aldershot, which from 9 October was under the command of Neville Lyttelton. War was declared on 11 October 1899, and he arrived at Cape Town on 18 November.

Wilson's brigade was amongst the troops sent to Natal – by late November it was encamped on the Mooi River, 509 miles from besieged Ladysmith. Wilson's brigade took part in the Battle of Colenso (15 December), in which British troops, advancing after an inadequate artillery bombardment, were shot down by entrenched and largely hidden Boers armed with magazine rifles.Redvers Buller, who was still in command in Natal despite having been replaced by Roberts as commander-in-chief, was awaiting the arrival of Sir Charles Warren's 5th Division. Artillery fire at the siege of Ladysmith could still be heard from Buller's positions, but he rejected a proposal by Wilson that the Light Brigade cross the Tugela River at Potgieter's Drift, 15 miles upstream. Wilson was critical both of the delay since 16 December and of Buller's failure to share information with Lyttelton and other senior officers. Buller allowed Lyttleton to cross at that spot on 16 January, with the bulk of his reinforced forces crossing unopposed at Trikhardt's Drift 5 miles upstream the following day. Wilson took credit for the Light Brigade's diversionary artillery fire during the Trikhardt's Drift crossing.

During the ensuing Battle of Spion Kop (24 January), Wilson was critical of Buller's lack of a proper staff, of his lack of communication, and of his interference with Warren whom he had placed in charge. In an account written after the battle he claimed to have wanted to draw off pressure by sending two battalions – the Scottish Rifles (Cameronians) and 60th King's Royal Rifle Corps, as well as Bethune's Buccaneers (a Mounted Infantry unit), to occupy the Sugar Loaf two miles East-North-East of Spion Kop, where Warren's men were under fire from three sides. Lyttelton – 25 years later – claimed that Wilson had suggested to him to send reinforcements to help Warren. Wilson's contemporary diary is ambiguous, claiming that "we" had sent the 60th to take the Sugar Loaf, whilst Bethune's men and the Rifles went to assist Warren, and that as the Kop became crowded Lyttelton refused Wilson's request to send the Rifles to the Sugar Loaf to assist the 60th.

After the defeat, Wilson was once again scornful of Buller's lack of progress and of his predictions that he would be in Ladysmith by 5 February. Leo Amery later told a malicious story that Wilson had suggested gathering the brigade majors together to arrest their commanding general, although Wilson in fact seems to have thought highly of Lyttelton at this time. He was also highly critical of Fitzroy Hart ("perfect disgrace … quite mad & incapable under fire"), commanding general of the Irish Brigade, for attacking Inniskilling Hill in close order on 24 February (see Battle of the Tugela Heights), and, on the same day, leaving the Durham Light Infantry (part of the Light Brigade) exposed to attack (Wilson visited the position, and they were withdrawn on 27 February after Wilson lobbied Lyttelton and Warren), and for leaving Wilson to organise a defence against a Boer night attack on Light Brigade HQ after refusing Light Brigade requests to post pickets. The Light Brigade finally took Inniskilling Hill on 27 February and Ladysmith was relieved the following day, allowing Wilson to meet his old friend Rawlinson, who had been besieged there, again. After the relief of Ladysmith, Wilson continued to be highly critical of the poor state of logistics and of the weak leadership of Buller and Douglas Cochrane, 12th Earl of Dundonald. After the Fall of Pretoria he correctly predicted that the Boers would turn to guerrilla warfare, although he did not expect the war to last until spring 1902.

In August 1900 Wilson was summoned to see "the Chief" and appointed to assist Rawlinson at the Adjutant-General's branch, choosing to remain there rather than return to his brigade-majorship (which passed to his brother Tono). Part of Wilson's motivation was his desire to return home earlier. He shared a house in Pretoria with Rawlinson and Eddie Stanley (later Edward Stanley, 17th Earl of Derby), Roberts' secretary – they were all in their mid-thirties and socialised with Roberts' daughters, then aged 24 and 29. Wilson was appointed deputy assistant adjutant-general (1 September 1900) and Roberts' assistant military secretary in September, which meant that he returned home with Roberts in December. Lyttelton had wanted him in South Africa on his staff, whilst Thomas Kelly-Kenny wanted him on the staff of Southern Command which he was hoping to obtain.

== Repington divorce ==
On 9 October 1899 Lieutenant Colonel Repington, for the sake of his career, gave Wilson his written promise to give up his mistress Mary Garstin. Wilson had been a friend of Mary Garstin's father, who had died in 1893, and she was a cousin of his friend Lady Guilford, who asked Wilson to get involved at Christmas 1898. On 12 February 1900 Repington told him that he regarded himself as absolved from his parole after learning that her husband had been spreading rumours of his other infidelities. During the divorce hearings Wilson refused Repington's request to sign an account of what had been said at their meeting, and was unable to grant the request of Kelly-Kenny (Adjutant-General to the Forces) for an account of the meeting as he had written no details of it in his diary (Lady Guilford had destroyed the letter which he had written to her containing details). He was thus unable or unwilling to confirm Repington's claim that he had released him from his parole. Repington believed that Wilson had "ratted" on a fellow soldier. Army gossip later had it that Wilson had deliberately ratted out a potential career rival. Repington had to resign his commission.

== Edwardian period ==
=== War Office ===
In 1901 Wilson spent nine months working under Ian Hamilton in the War Office, working to allocate honours and awards from the recent South African War. He himself was Mentioned in Despatches and appointed a Companion of the Distinguished Service Order, which Aylmer Haldane later claimed Wilson had insisted on receiving out of jealousy that he had been awarded it. Wilson was also recommended for brevet promotion to lieutenant colonel on attaining a substantive majority.

Between March and May 1901, at the behest of the Liberal Unionist MP Sir William Rattigan, and against the backdrop of St John Brodrick's proposed Army reforms, Wilson – writing anonymously as "a Staff Officer" – published a series of twelve articles on Army Reform in the Lahore Civil and Military Gazette. He argued that given the recent great growth in the size of the Empire Britain could no longer rely on the Royal Navy alone. Wilson argued that the three main roles of the Army were home defence, defence of India (against Russia), Egypt and Canada (against the US, with whom Wilson nonetheless hoped Britain would remain on friendly terms), and defence of major coaling stations and ports for the Royal Navy's use. Unlike St John Brodrick, Wilson at this stage explicitly ruled out Britain becoming involved in a European war. Without her major colonies, he argued, Britain would suffer "the fate of Spain". He wanted 250,000 men to be made available for overseas service, not the 120,000 proposed by Brodrick, and contemplated the introduction of conscription (which had been ruled out by the Liberal Opposition). In private Wilson – partly motivated by the poor performance of ill-trained Yeomanry units in South Africa – and other War Office officers were less complimentary about Brodrick's proposed reforms.

=== Battalion commander ===
Wilson gained both the substantive promotion to major and the promised brevet in December 1901, and in 1902 became commanding officer of the 9th Provisional Battalion, Rifle Brigade at Colchester, intended to supply drafts for the South African War, then still in progress. The battalion was disbanded in February 1903.

=== Military education and training ===
Wilson went back to the War Office as Rawlinson's assistant at the Department of Military Education and Training under General Sir Henry Hildyard. The three men led a committee which worked on a "Manual of Combined Training" and a "Staff Manual" which formed the basis of Field Service Regulations Part II, which was to be in force when the Army went to war in August 1914. With £1,600 borrowed from his father, Wilson bought a house off Marylebone Road. In April 1903 he became a deputy assistant adjutant general at army headquarters and then assistant adjutant general.

At this time Wilson was becoming friendly with political figures such as Arthur Balfour, Winston Churchill, Leo Amery and Leo Maxse. Some of St John Brodrick's proposed reforms were criticised by the Elgin Report in August 1903. Brodrick was being attacked in Parliament by Conservative MPs, including Amery, to whom Wilson was feeding information.

=== Esher reforms and General Staff ===
On Leo Amery's suggestion Wilson's colleague Gerald Ellison was appointed Secretary of the War Office (Reconstitution) Committee (see Esher Report). Wilson approved of Esher's aims, but not the whirlwind speed by which he began making changes at the War Office. Wilson impressed Esher, and was put in charge of the new department which managed Staff College, RMA, RMC and officers' promotion exams.

Wilson, promoted on 2 December 1904 to brevet colonel, attended the first ever General Staff Conference and Staff Ride at Camberley in January 1905. He continued to lobby for a General Staff to be set up, especially after the Dogger Bank incident of October 1904. Wilson proposed a strong Chief of the General Staff who would be the Secretary of State for War's sole adviser on matters of strategy, ironically the position which would be held by Wilson's rival Robertson during the First World War. Despite pressure from Repington, Esher and Sir George Clarke, progress on the General Staff was very slow. In August Brodrick's successor H. O. Arnold-Forster issued a minute similar to Wilson's of three months previous. Neville Lyttelton (Chief of the General Staff), unaware of Wilson's role, expressed support. In November Wilson released Arnold-Forster's memo to the press, claiming he had been ordered to do so; Arnold-Forster initially expressed "amazement" but then agreed that the leak had "done nothing but good".

The Wilsons had Christmas Dinner with Roberts in 1904 and 1905. Wilson assisted Roberts with his House of Lords speeches, and the closeness of their relationship attracted disapproval from Lyttelton, and possibly French and Arnold-Forster. Relations with Lyttelton became more strained in 1905–06, possibly out of jealousy or influenced by Repington. Wilson had predicted a hung Parliament in January 1906, but to his disgust, "that traitor C.B." had won a landslide.

There was a war scare in May 1906 when the Turks occupied an old Egyptian fort at the head of the Gulf of Aqaba. Wilson noted that Grierson (Director of Military Operations) and Lyttelton ("absolutely incapable … positively a dangerous fool") had approved the proposed scheme for military action, but neither the adjutant-general nor the quartermaster-general had been consulted. Repington wrote to Esher that Wilson was an "intriguing impostor" and "a low-class schemer whose sole aptitude is for worshipping rising suns – an aptitude expressed by those who know him in more vulgar language". On 12 September 1906 Army Order 233 set up a General Staff to supervise education and training and to draw up war plans (Wilson had drafted an Army Order late in 1905, but it had been held up by disputes over whether staff officers should be appointed by the Chief of the General Staff as Wilson preferred or by an eleven-man selection board).

== Commandant, Staff College ==
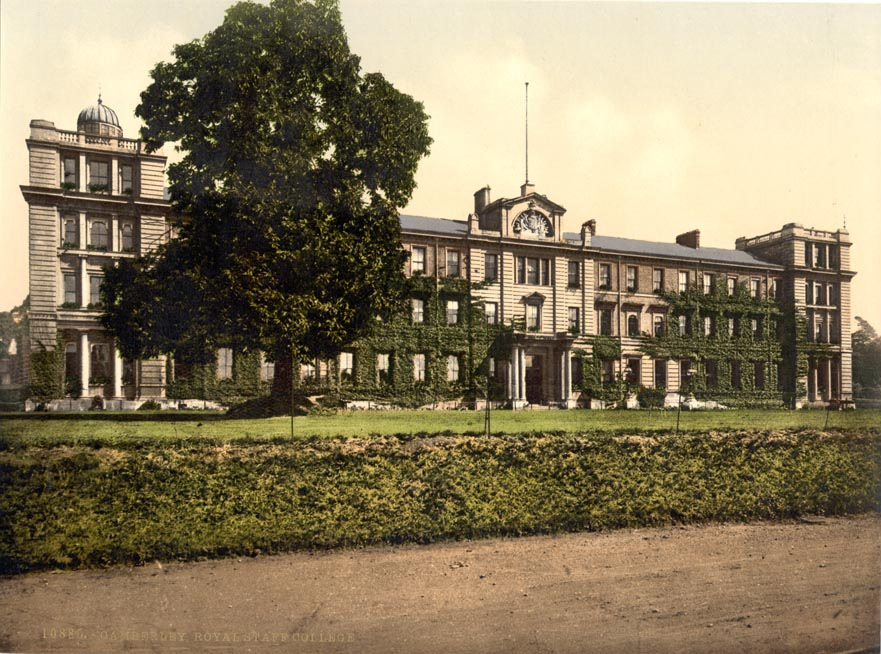
The Staff College, Camberley, where Wilson served as Commandant

=== Appointment ===
Wilson had hoped to succeed Colonel Rawlinson as commandant of the Staff College, Camberley. In July Lyttelton (Chief of the General Staff), who appears to have disliked Wilson, raised the job to a brigadier-general's position, for which Wilson was not yet senior enough.

On 16 July 1906 Rawlinson told Wilson that he wanted him to succeed him at the end of the year, and the news appeared in the press in August. Field Marshal Roberts wrote to Richard Haldane (Secretary of State for War) and Esher recommending Wilson on the basis of his excellent staff work in South Africa, and as a strong character needed to maintain Rawlinson's improvements at Camberley. Wilson, who learned indirectly from Aylmer Haldane on 24 October that he was to get the job, and was in little doubt that Roberts' support had clinched it for him. Wilson remained very close to Roberts, often joining him for Christmas Dinner and attending his Golden Wedding in May 1909. French had initially been suspicious of Wilson as a Roberts protégé, but now supported his candidacy, and by 1912 Wilson had become his most trusted adviser.

Wilson was promoted to substantive colonel on 1 January 1907 and his appointment as temporary brigadier-general and commandant of the Staff College, Camberley, was announced on 8 January 1907, where he succeeded Rawlinson. He was at first short of money – he had to borrow £350 (£36403 in 2016) to cover the expense of moving to Camberley, where his official salary was not enough to cover the cost of entertaining expected – and initially had to cut back on foreign holidays and social trips to London but after inheriting £1,300 on his father's death in August 1907 was able to buy polo ponies and a second car in subsequent years. His pay as commandant rose from £1,200 in 1907 to £1,350 in 1910.

=== Doctrine ===
In speeches to students, Wilson stressed the need for administrative knowledge ("the drudgery of staffwork"), physical fitness, imagination, "sound judgement of men & affairs" and "constant reading & reflexion on the campaigns of the great masters". Brian Bond argued that Wilson's "School of Thought" meant not just common training for staff officers but also espousal of conscription and the military commitment to send a BEF to France in the event of war. Keith Jeffery argues that this is a misunderstanding by Bond: there is no evidence in Wilson's writings to confirm that he meant the phrase in that way.

Although Wilson was less obsessed about the dangers of espionage than James Edward Edmonds, in March 1908 he had two German barbers removed as potential spies from Staff College.

Wilson was appointed a Companion of the Order of the Bath in the June 1908 Birthday Honours.

In 1908 Wilson had his senior class prepare a scheme for the deployment of an Expeditionary Force to France, assuming Germany to have invaded Belgium. Questions were asked in the House of Commons when news of this leaked out, and the following year no assumption was made of a German invasion of Belgium, and students were sharply reminded that the exercise was "SECRET". Wilson first met Ferdinand Foch on a visit to the École supérieure de guerre in 1909; they struck up a good rapport. Wilson arranged for Foch and Victor Huguet to visit Britain in June 1910, and copied his practice of setting students outdoor exercises in which they were distracted by instructors shouting at them whilst they were attempting to draw up plans at short notice.

Accompanied by Colonel George Harper, Wilson reconnoitred the likely future theatre of war. In August 1908, along with Edward Perceval ("Perks"), they explored south of Namur by train and bicycle. In August 1909, Harper and Wilson travelled from Mons then down the French frontier almost as far as Switzerland. In spring 1910, this time by motor car, they travelled from Rotterdam into Germany, then explored the German side of the frontier.

Wilson privately supported conscription at least as early as 1905. He thought Haldane's scheme to merge Militia, Yeomanry and Volunteers into a new Territorial Force would not be enough to match German training and efficiency. Wilson successfully lobbied Haldane for an increase in the size of the Staff College to provide officers for the new TF. During Wilson's tenure the number of instructors rose from 7 to 16 and the number of students from 64 to 100. In total, 224 Army and 22 Royal Navy officers studied under him.

Wilson voted for Parliament for the first time in January 1910 (for the Unionists). He recorded that "the lies told by the Radicals from Asquith down are revolting".

=== Lecturing style ===
Launcelot Kiggell wrote that Wilson was a "spell-binding" lecturer as commandant at Camberley. During his time as commandant, Wilson gave 33 lectures. A number of students, of whom the most famous was Archibald Wavell, later contrasted Wilson's expansive lecturing, ranging widely and wittily over geopolitics, with the more practical focus of his successor Robertson. Many of these recollections are unreliable in their details, may well exaggerate the differences between the two men, and may have been influenced by Wilson's indiscreet diaries published in the 1920s.

Berkeley Vincent, who had been an observer in the Russo-Japanese War (he was a protégé of Ian Hamilton, whom Wilson appears to have disliked), took a more critical view of Wilson. He objected to Wilson's tactical views – Wilson was sceptical of claims that Japanese morale had enabled their infantry to overcome Russian defensive firepower – and his lecturing style: "a sort of witty buffoonery … a sort of English stage Irishman".

=== Succession ===
In May and June 1909 Wilson had been tipped to succeed Haig as Director of Staff Duties, although he would have preferred command of a brigade. In April and May 1910, with his term of office at Camberley still officially running until January 1911, the Chief of the Imperial General Staff (CIGS), William Nicholson, told Wilson that he was to succeed Spencer Ewart as director of military operations that summer and vetoed him from accepting Horace Smith-Dorrien's offer of a brigade at Aldershot.

Wilson recommended Kiggell as his successor and thought the appointment of William Robertson "a tremendous gamble". Robertson visited Camberley with Lord Kitchener (28 July 1910), who criticised Wilson; this may have been one of the causes of the poor relations between Wilson and Kitchener in August 1914. Edmonds later told a story of how Wilson had left a bill for £250 for furniture and improvements to the Commandant's residence, and that Wilson's predecessor Rawlinson, when approached by Robertson for advice, had commented that many of these improvements had been made by his own wife or by previous Commandants. Whatever the truth of the matter, relations between Wilson and Robertson deteriorated thereafter.

Repington (whom Wilson thought a "lying brute") attacked the current standards of British staff officers in The Times on 27 September 1910, arguing that Wilson had educated staff officers to be "sucking Napoleons" and that Robertson was a "first rate man" who would sort it out.

== Director of Military Operations ==
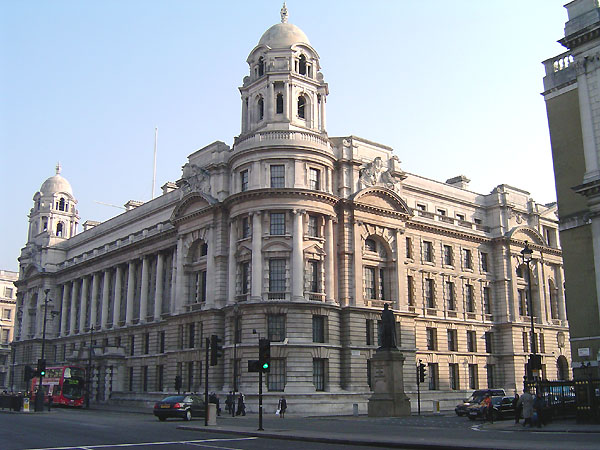
The Old War Office building where Wilson took office as Director of Military Operations

=== Initial decisions ===
In 1910 Wilson became director of military operations at the British War Office. Wilson believed his most important duty as DMO to be planning for deployment of an expeditionary force to France. Of the 36 papers which Wilson wrote as DMO, 21 were taken up by matters pertaining to the Expeditionary Force. He hoped also to get conscription brought in, but this came to nothing.

Wilson described the size of Haldane's planned Expeditionary Force as simply a "reshuffle" of the troops available in Britain. Ferdinand Foch was keen to enlist British military aid. He invited Wilson and Colonel Fairholme, British military attaché in Paris, to his daughter's wedding in October 1910. On a visit to London (6 December 1910) Wilson took him for a meeting with Sir Arthur Nicolson, Permanent Under-Secretary of State for Foreign Affairs.

In 1910 Wilson bought 36 Eaton Place on a 13-year lease for £2,100. His salary was then £1,500. The house was a financial burden and the Wilsons often let it out.

Wilson and his staff spent the winter of 1910–11 conducting a "great strategical War Game" to predict what the great powers would do when war broke out.

=== Early 1911 ===
Wilson thought the existing plans for deployment of the BEF (known as the "WF" scheme – this stood for "With France" but was sometimes wrongly thought to stand for "Wilson-Foch") "disgraceful. A pure academic, paper arrangement of no earthly value". He sent Nicholson a long minute demanding authority over transport planning. He was given this after a lunch with Haldane.

On 27–28 January 1911, Wilson visited Brussels, dining with members of the Belgian General Staff, and later exploring the part of the country south of the Meuse with the military attaché Colonel Tom Bridges. Between 17 and 27 February, he visited Germany, meeting Chancellor Bethmann Hollweg and Admiral Alfred von Tirpitz at a dinner at the British Embassy. On the return journey he dined in Paris with Foch, whom he warned against listening to Repington, and the French Chief of Staff General Laffort de Ladibat. Admiral John Fisher was hostile to Wilson's plans to deploy forces to the continent. By 21 March Wilson was preparing plans to embark the BEF infantry by Day 4 of mobilisation, followed by the cavalry on Day 7 and the artillery on Day 9. Refusing Nicholson's request (April 1911) that he help with Repington's new Army Review, he declared him "a man devoid of honour, & a liar".

=== Second Moroccan crisis ===
On 19 July Wilson went to Paris for talks with Adolphe Messimy (French War Minister) and General Auguste Dubail (French chief of staff). The Wilson-Dubail memorandum, although making explicit that neither government was committed to action, promised that in the event of war the Royal Navy would transport 150,000 men to Rouen, Le Havre and Boulogne, and that the BEF would concentrate between Arras, Cambrai and St Quentin by the thirteenth day of mobilisation. In reality, the transport plans were nowhere near ready, although it is unclear that the French knew this. The French called the Expeditionary Force "l'Armee Wilson" although they seem to have been left with an inflated idea of the size of commitment which Britain would send.

Wilson approved of David Lloyd George's Mansion House speech (backing France). He lunched with Grey and Sir Eyre Crowe (assistant under-secretary at the Foreign Office) on 9 August, urging them that Britain must mobilise on the same day as France and send the whole six divisions.

=== CID meeting ===
Maurice Hankey complained of Wilson's "perfect obsession for military operations on the Continent", scoffing at his bicycling trips around the French and Belgian borders, and accusing him of filling the War Office with like-minded officers. At Nicholson's request Wilson prepared a paper arguing that British aid would be necessary to prevent Germany achieving domination of the continent. He argued that by Day 13 of mobilisation France would have the upper hand, outnumbering the Germans, but by Day 17 Germany would outnumber France. However, because of road bottlenecks, the Germans would at most be able to deploy 54 divisions in the opening phase, allowing the 6 infantry divisions of the BEF a disproportionate effect on the outcome. Ernest R. May later claimed that Wilson had "cooked" these figures, but his arguments were challenged by Edward Bennett, who felt that Wilson's numbers were not far wrong.

This became the General Staff position for the Committee of Imperial Defence (CID) meeting on 23 August. Sir Arthur Wilson proposed that 5 divisions guard Britain whilst one land on the Baltic coast, or possibly at Antwerp, believing that the Germans would be halfway to Paris by the time an Expeditionary Force was ready, and that the four to six divisions Britain was expected to be able to muster would have little effect. Wilson thought the Royal Navy plan "one of the most childish papers I ever read". Henry Wilson set out his own plans, apparently the first time the CID had heard them. Hankey recorded that Wilson's lucid presentation carried the day. Prime Minister H. H. Asquith ordered the Navy to fall in with the Army's plans.

Wilson had recommended deploying at Maubeuge. He thought (wrongly) that the Germans would only violate Belgian territory south of the Meuse. Over the next few weeks Wilson had several meetings with Winston Churchill, Sir Edward Grey and Lloyd George, who were keen to obtain an agreement with Belgium. This attracted the opposition of Haldane and Nicholson, who suppressed a lengthy paper by Wilson arguing for an agreement with Belgium; the paper was eventually circulated to the CID by Nicholson's successor Sir John French in April 1912.

=== Late 1911 ===
Throughout the Agadir Crisis Wilson was keen to pass on the latest intelligence to Churchill. Wilson recorded four separate reports from spies of German troops massing opposite the Belgian frontier. Wilson was also responsible for Military Intelligence, then in its infancy. This included MO5 and the embryonic MI5 and MI6. It is unclear from the surviving documents just how much of Wilson's time was taken up by these agencies.

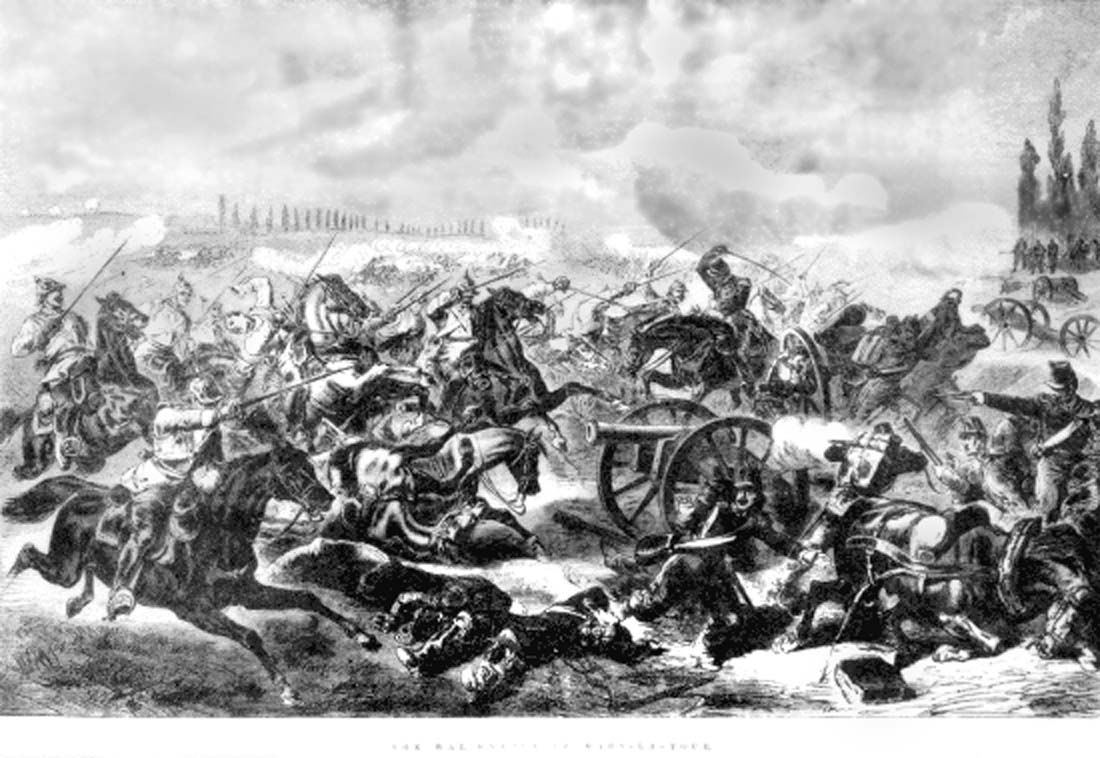
Wilson visited the battlefield of Mars-La-Tour where the French and Prussian Armies had clashed in 1870

In October 1911 Wilson went on another bicycle tour of Belgium south of the Meuse. On his way home, still keen to "snaffle these Belgians" he visited the British military attaché in Brussels.

Radical members of the Cabinet pushed for Wilson's removal, but he was staunchly defended by Haldane, who had the backing of the most influential ministers: Asquith, Grey and Lloyd George, as well as Churchill.

=== 1912 ===
Intelligence suggested that Germany was preparing for war in April 1912. Sir John French, the new CIGS, was receptive to Wilson's wishes to prepare for war. Through his brother Jemmy, Wilson forged links with the new Conservative leader Bonar Law. Jemmy had been on the platform in Belfast in April 1912 when Law addressed a mass meeting against Home Rule, and in the summer of 1912 he came to London to work for the Ulster Defence League (run by Walter Long and Charlie Hunter). Wilson dined with Law and was impressed by him, discussing Ireland and defence matters. That summer he began having regular talks with Long, who used Wilson as a conduit to try to establish cross-party defence agreement with Churchill.

Wilson thought Haldane a fool for thinking that Britain would have a time window of up to six months in which to deploy the BEF. In September 1912 he inspected Warsaw with Alfred Knox, British military attaché in Russia, then met Yakov Zhilinskiy in Saint Petersburg, before visiting the battlefield of Borodino, and Kiev, then – in Austria-Hungary – Lemberg, Kraków and Vienna. Plans to visit Constantinople had to be shelved because of the First Balkan War, although Wilson recorded his concerns that the Bulgars had beaten the Turks a month after the declaration of war – evidence that the BEF must be committed to war at once.

By 14 November 1912 the railway timetables were ready, after two years of work. A joint Admiralty-War Office committee, including representatives of the merchant shipping industry, met fortnightly from February 1913, and produced a workable scheme by spring 1914. Brian Bond argued that Wilson's greatest achievement as DMO was the provision of horses and transport and other measures which allowed mobilisation to proceed smoothly.

In November 1912 Repington, who wanted to use the Territorial Army as a basis for conscription, urged Haldane (now Lord Chancellor) to have Wilson sacked and replaced by Robertson.

In 1912 Wilson was appointed honorary colonel of the 3rd Battalion, Royal Irish Rifles.

=== 1913 ===
Wilson's support for conscription made him friendly with Leo Amery, Arthur Lee, Charlie Hunter, Earl Percy, Simon Fraser, 14th Lord Lovat, James Louis Garvin of The Observer, Howell Arthur Gwynne of The Morning Post and F. S. Oliver, owner of the Department Store Debenham and Freebody. In December 1912 Wilson cooperated with Gwynne and Oliver in a campaign to destroy the Territorial Force.

In the spring of 1913 Roberts arranged a reconciliation between Repington and Wilson. Repington wrote a letter to The Times in June 1913, demanding to know why Wilson was not playing a more prominent role in the debates of 1913–14 as to whether some British regular divisions should be retained at home to defeat a potential invasion. In May 1913 Wilson suggested that Earl Percy write an article against the "voluntary principle" for the National Review and helped him write it. He was also drafting pro-conscription speeches for Lord Roberts.

Wilson visited France seven times in 1913, including a visit in August to observe French manoeuvres. Wilson spoke French fluently but not perfectly, and would sometimes revert into English for sensitive matters in order not to risk speaking inaccurately.

In October 1913 Wilson visited Constantinople. Wilson was unimpressed by the Turkish Army and road and rail infrastructure, and felt that the introduction of constitutional government would be the final blow to the Ottoman Empire. These views may have contributed to the underestimation of Turkey's defence strength at Gallipoli.

Roberts had been lobbying French to promote Wilson to major-general, a rank appropriate to his job as DMO, since the end of 1912. In April 1913, with a brigade command about to fall vacant, Wilson was assured by French that he was to be promoted to major-general later in the year, and that not having commanded a brigade would not prevent him commanding a division later. Wilson believed that French wanted him to become chief of staff designate of the BEF after the 1913 manoeuvres, but that he was too junior. Instead Archibald Murray was appointed.

Wilson was promoted major general in November 1913. French confided that he intended to have his own term as CIGS extended by two years to 1918, and to be succeeded by Murray, at which point Wilson was to succeed Murray as sub-CIGS. After a 17 November 1913 meeting of BEF senior officers, Wilson privately recorded his concerns at French's lack of intellect and hoped there would not be a war just yet.

Early in 1914, at an exercise at Staff College, Wilson acted as chief of staff. Edmonds later wrote that Robertson, acting as Exercise Director, drew Wilson's attention to his ignorance of certain procedures, and said to French in a stage whisper "if you go to war with that operations staff, you are as good as beaten".

== Curragh incident ==
As far back as 1893, during the failed passage of William Ewart Gladstone's Second Home Rule Bill, Wilson had been party to a proposal to raise 2,000–4,000 men to drill as soldiers in Ulster. Wilson supported Ulster Unionist opponents of the Third Irish Home Rule Bill, due to become law in 1914. Wilson had learned from his brother Jemmy about plans to raise 25,000 armed men and 100,000 "constables", and to form a Provisional Government in Ulster to take control of banks and railways, which he thought "all very sensible". At a meeting at the War Office in November 1913, Wilson told French that "England is opposed to Home Rule, and England must agree to it ... I cannot bring myself to believe that Asquith will be so mad as to employ force". French, whom Wilson urged to tell the King that he could not depend on the loyalty of the whole of the Army, was unaware that Wilson was leaking the contents of these meetings to the Conservative leader Bonar Law.

Wilson met Bonar Law and passed on his wife Cecil's advice that the Ulster Volunteer Force (UVF) should take the patriotic high ground by pledging to fight for King and Country in the event of war. Bonar Law immediately attempted to reach Edward Carson on the telephone to relay this suggestion. Wilson also advised Bonar Law to ensure that negotiations failed in way which made the Irish Nationalists look intransigent. On 14 November he dined with Charlie Hunter and Lord Milner, who told him that any officers who resigned over Ulster would be reinstated by the next Conservative Government. Wilson found Asquith's Leeds speech – in which the Prime Minister promised to "see this thing through" without an election – "ominous", and on 28 November John Du Cane turned up at the War Office "furious" with Asquith and asserting that Ulster would have to be granted Belligerent status like the Confederate States of America.

The Wilson and Rawlinson families spent Christmas with Lord Roberts, who was strongly opposed to the planned legislation, as was Brigadier John Gough, with whom Wilson played golf on Boxing Day, as was Leo Amery with whom he lunched at White's on New Year's Day. Wilson's main concern was "that the army should not be drawn in", and on 5 January he had "a long and serious talk about Ulster & whether we couldn't do something to keep the Army out of it" with Joey Davies (Director of Staff Duties since October 1913) and Robertson (Director of Military Training), and the three men agreed to take soundings of army opinion at the annual Staff College conference at Camberley the following week. At the end of February Wilson went to Belfast, where he visited the Unionist Headquarters at Old Town Hall. His mission was not secret – the official purpose was to inspect 3rd Royal Irish Rifles and give a lecture on the Balkans at Victoria Barracks, and he reported his opinion of the Ulster situation to the Secretary of State and to Sir John French – but attracted press speculation. Wilson was delighted by the Ulster Volunteers (now 100,000 strong), to whom he was also leaking information.

=== The incident ===
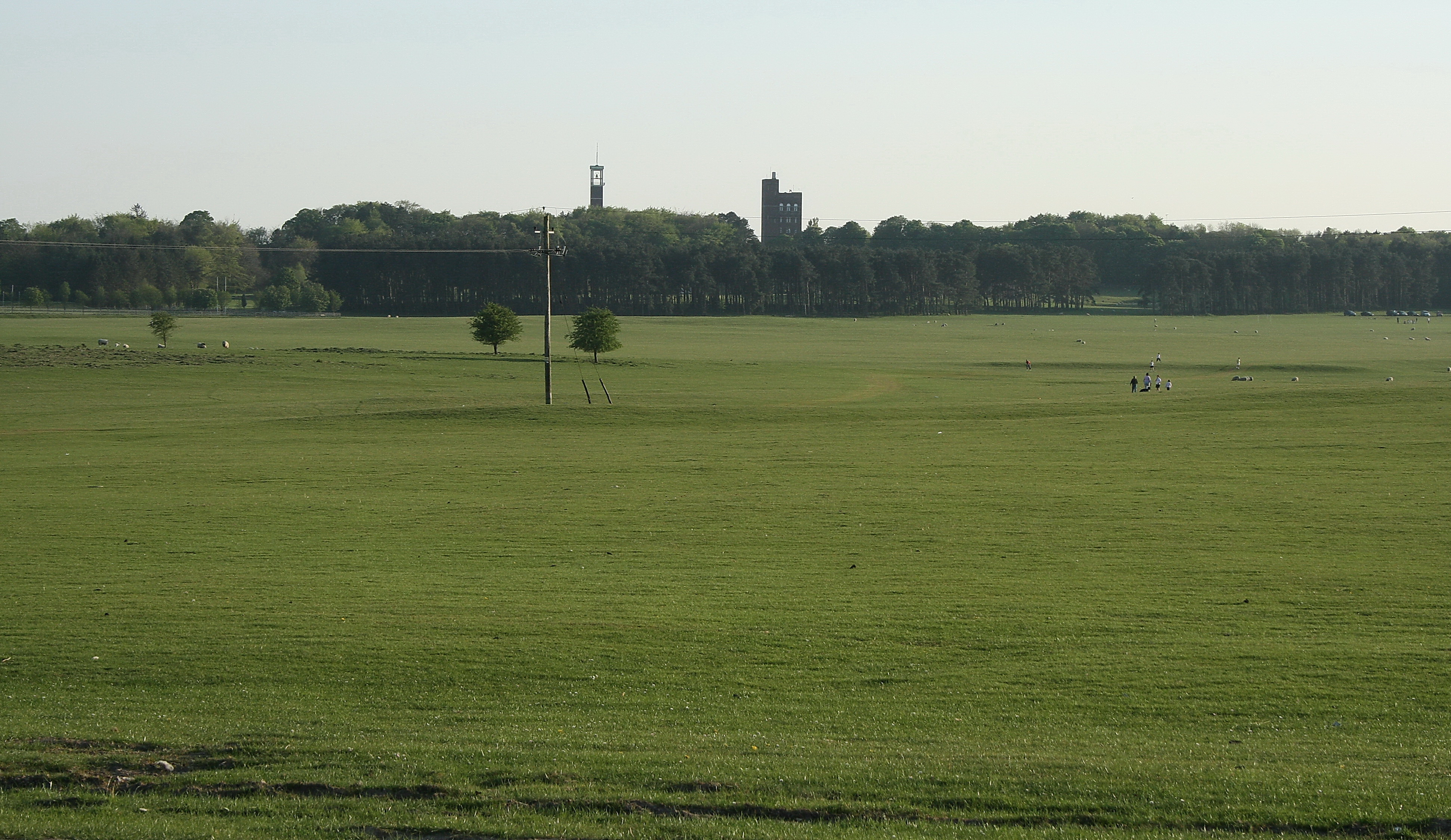
Curragh Camp, scene of the Curragh incident

After Arthur Paget had been told to prepare to deploy troops in Ulster, Wilson attempted in vain to persuade French that any such move would have serious repercussions not only in Glasgow but also in Egypt and India. Wilson helped the elderly Lord Roberts (morning of 20 March) draft a letter to the Prime Minister, urging him not to cause a split in the army. Wilson was summoned home by his wife to see Johnnie Gough, who had come up from Aldershot, and told him of Hubert Gough's threat to resign (see Curragh incident). Wilson advised Johnnie not to "send in his papers" (resign) just yet, and telephoned French, who when told of the news "talked windy platitudes till (Wilson) was nearly sick".

By the morning of Saturday 21 Wilson was talking of resigning and urging his staff to do the same, although he never actually did so and forfeited respect by talking too much of bringing down the government. With Parliament debating a Conservative motion of censure on the government for using the Army in Ulster, Repington telephoned Wilson (21 April 1914) to ask what line The Times should take. Fresh from a visit to Bonar Law (21 March), Wilson suggested prodding Asquith to take "instant action" to prevent general staff resignations. At the request of John Seely (Secretary of State for War) Wilson wrote a summary of "what the army would agree to", namely a promise that the army would not be used to coerce Ulster, but this was not acceptable to the government. Despite Robertson's warm support, Wilson was unable to persuade French to warn the government that the Army would not move against Ulster.

Hubert Gough breakfasted with Wilson on 23 March, before his meeting with French and Spencer Ewart at the War Office, where he demanded a written guarantee that the Army would not be used against Ulster. Wilson was also present at the 4pm meeting at which Gough, on his advice, insisted on amending a Cabinet document to clarify that the Army would not be used to enforce Home Rule on Ulster, to which French also agreed in writing. Wilson then left, telling people in the War Office that the Army had done what the Opposition had failed to do (i.e. prevent the coercion of Ulster). Wilson told French that he suspected he (French) would be sacked by the Government, in which case "the Army would go solid with him". To his brother's amusement, Johnnie Gough "hotted" (teased) Wilson by affecting to believe that he was actually going to resign. Wilson was worried that a future Dublin government might issue "lawful orders" to coerce Ulster. At the top of his diary page for 23 March he wrote: "We soldiers beat Asquith & his vile tricks".

Asquith publicly repudiated the amendments to the Cabinet document, but at first refused to accept the resignations of French and Ewart, although Wilson advised French that he must resign "unless they were in a position to justify their remaining on in the eyes of officers". French eventually resigned after Wilson tested the climate at a Staff College point-to-point.

=== Effects ===
Wilson telegraphed Gough twice and advised him to "stand like a rock" and hold onto the document, but received no reply. Milner thought Wilson had "saved the Empire", which Wilson thought "much too flattering". He thought Lord Morley (who had advised Seely) and Haldane (who advised French) would also have to resign, which would bring down the government. Gough was angry that Wilson had not himself offered to resign and blamed Wilson for having done nothing to stop the government's plans to coerce Ulster until Gough and his officers threatened to resign. The Gough brothers thereafter cut Wilson.

Between 21 March and the end of the month, Wilson saw Law nine times, Amery four times, Gwynne three times, and Milner and Arthur Lee twice. He does not seem to have regarded these contacts with the Opposition as secret. Roberts was also leaking information which he was being fed by Wilson and the Gough brothers. Gough promised to keep the 23 March Treaty confidential, but it soon leaked to the press – it appears that both Gough and French leaked it to Gwynne, whilst Wilson leaked it to Amery and Bonar Law.

== First World War ==
=== 1914 ===
==== Outbreak of war ====
Wilson visited France four times to discuss war plans between January and May 1914. With the CID having recommended that two of the British Expeditionary Force (BEF)'s six divisions be retained at home to guard against invasion, Wilson successfully lobbied Asquith, who was Secretary of State for War, to send at least five divisions to France.

During the July Crisis Wilson was mainly preoccupied with the apparent imminence of civil war in Ireland and vainly lobbied the new CIGS Charles Douglas to flood the whole of Ireland with troops. By the end of July it was clear that the continent was on the brink of hostilities. Wilson called on Louis de La Panouse (French military attaché) and Paul Cambon (French Ambassador) to discuss the military situation. Wilson may well have been keeping the Conservative leadership informed of discussions between Cambon and Foreign Secretary Grey. The German invasion of Belgium provided a casus belli and Britain mobilized on 3 August and declared war on 4 August.

==== Sub Chief of Staff, BEF: deployment ====
Wilson was initially offered the job of "Brigadier-General of Operations" but as he was already a major-general he negotiated an upgrade in his title to "Sub Chief of Staff". James Edward Edmonds, Walter Kirke and Archibald Murray all claimed after the war that French had wanted Wilson as chief of staff, but this had been vetoed because of his role in the Curragh incident; no contemporary evidence, even Wilson's diary, confirms this.

Wilson met with Victor Huguet (7 August), a French liaison officer summoned to London at Kitchener's request, and sent him back to France to obtain more information from Joseph Joffre, having told him of British plans to start movement of troops on 9 August. Kitchener, angry that Wilson had acted without consulting him, summoned him for a rebuke. Wilson was angry that Kitchener was confusing the mobilisation plans by deploying troops from Aldershot to Grimsby in case of German invasion, and recorded in his diary that "I answered back as I have no intention of being bullied by him especially when he talks such nonsense … the man is a fool … He is a d---- fool". On Huguet's return (12 August) he met with French, Murray and Wilson. They agreed to deploy the BEF to Maubeuge, but Kitchener, in a three-hour meeting which was, according to Wilson, "memorable in showing K's colossal ignorance and conceit", tried to insist on a deployment to Amiens where the BEF would be in less danger of being overrun by the Germans coming north of the Meuse. Wilson wrote not just of the difficulties and delays which Kitchener was making but also of "the cowardice of it", although historian John Terraine later argued that Kitchener's opposition to a forward deployment was proven entirely correct by the nearness which the BEF came to disaster. The clash of personalities between Wilson and Kitchener worsened relations between Kitchener and Sir John French, who often took Wilson's advice.

Wilson, French and Murray crossed to France on 14 August. Wilson was sceptical of the German invasion of Belgium, feeling that it would be diverted to meet the French thrusts into Lorraine and the Ardennes. Reconnoitring the area with George Harper in August 1913, Wilson had wanted to deploy the BEF just east of Namur. Although Wilson's prediction of the German advance was less prescient than Kitchener's, had this been done, it is possible that Anglo-French forces could have attacked north, threatening to cut off the German Armies moving westwards north of the Meuse.

Like other British commanders Wilson, at first, underestimated the size of German forces opposite the BEF, although Terraine and Richard Holmes are very critical of the advice which Wilson was giving Sir John on 22 August, encouraging further BEF advances and "calculating" that the BEF was faced only by one German corps and a cavalry division. Wilson even issued a rebuke to the Cavalry Division for reporting that strong German forces were heading on Mons from Brussels, claiming that they were mistaken.

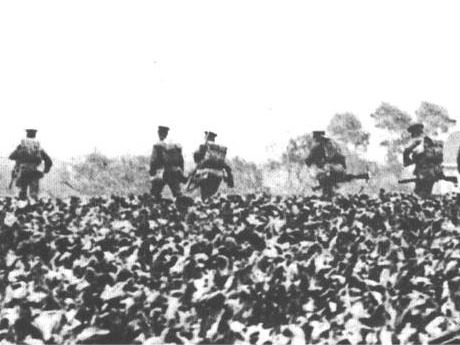
British troops retreating after the Battle of Mons

On 23 August, the day of the Battle of Mons, Wilson initially drafted orders for II Corps and the cavalry division to attack the following day, which Sir John cancelled. On 24 August, the day after the battle, he bemoaned that no retreat would have been necessary had the BEF had six infantry divisions as originally planned. Terraine describes Wilson's diary account of these events as "a ridiculous summary ... by a man in a responsible position", and argues that although Kitchener's fears of a German invasion of Britain had been exaggerated, his consequent decision to hold back two divisions saved the BEF from a greater disaster which might have been brought on by Wilson's overconfidence.

==== Sub Chief of Staff, BEF: retreat ====
The BEF staff performed poorly over the next few days. Wilson was concerned at Murray's medical unfitness and French's apparent inability to grasp the situation. He opposed Horace Smith-Dorrien's decision to stand and fight at Le Cateau (26 August). However, when told by Smith-Dorrien that it would not be possible to break off and fall back until nightfall, by his own account he wished him luck. Smith-Dorrien's slightly different recollection was that Wilson had warned that he risked being encircled like the French at Sedan in 1870.

Christopher Baker-Carr recalled Wilson's standing in dressing gown and slippers uttering "sardonic little jests to all and sundry within earshot" as GHQ packed up to evacuate, behaviour which historian Dan Todman comments was probably "reassuring for some but profoundly irritating for others". Nevil Macready recorded Wilson (27 August) "walking slowly up and down" the room at Noyon which had been commandeered as headquarters with a "comical, whimsical expression", clapping his hands and chanting "We shall never get there, we shall never get there … to the sea, to the sea, to the sea", although he also recorded that this was probably intended to keep up the spirits of more junior officers. His infamous "sauve qui peut" order to Thomas Snow, general officer commanding (GOC) 4th Division, (27 August) ordering unnecessary ammunition and officers' kits to be dumped so that tired and wounded soldiers could be carried, was, according to Ernest Swinton, probably intended out of concern for the soldiers rather than out of panic. Smith-Dorrien was later rebuked by French for countermanding it. Lord Loch thought the order showed "GHQ had lost their heads" whilst General Aylmer Haldane thought it "a mad order" (both in their diaries for 28 August). Major-general Richard Pope-Hennessy later alleged (in the 1930s) that Wilson had ordered the destruction of orders issued during the retreat to hide the degree of panic.

After the war Wilson claimed that the Germans ought to have won in 1914 but for bad luck. William Bartholomew, who had been a staff captain at the time, later told Basil Liddell Hart that Wilson had been "the man who saved the British Army" for ordering Smith-Dorrien to retreat southwards after Le Cateau, thus breaking contact with the Germans who had expected him to retreat southwest. Wilson played an important role liaising with the French, and also appears to have dissuaded Joffre against further attacks by Lanrezac, with which the British would not have been able to assist (29 August). Whilst Murray was having an important meeting (4 September) with Joseph Gallieni (Military governor of Paris) and Michel Maunoury (commander, French Sixth Army) to discuss the planned Allied counterattack which would become the First Battle of the Marne, Wilson was having a simultaneous meeting with Louis Franchet d'Esperey (Fifth Army, on the British right), which envisaged Sixth Army attacking north of the Marne. Wilson later persuaded Sir John French to cancel his orders to retreat further south (4 September) and helped persuade him to join in the Battle of the Marne (6 September). Like many Allied leaders, Wilson believed after the victory at the Marne that the war was as good as won.

==== Succession to Murray ====
Wilson acted as chief of staff for the BEF when Murray visited the War Office in October. Like many senior Allied officers, Wilson believed that the war would be won by the following spring and felt that Kitchener was jeopardising the victory by withholding officers in Britain for what Wilson called his "shadow armies". Wilson did not envisage British troops fighting under French command and opposed Foch's request that Edmund Allenby and two battalions take part in a French attack. Murray (4–5 November) complained and threatened to resign when Wilson amended one of his orders without telling him. Wilson was present at the deathbed of his old patron Lord Roberts, returning home for the funeral at St Paul's Cathedral.

French told Wilson he was thinking of moving Murray to a corps command and insisting on Wilson replacing him, but Asquith forbade French to promote "that poisonous tho' clever ruffian Wilson who behaved ... so badly ... about Ulster". Wilson claimed to have heard Joffre complain that it was "a pity" that Murray had not been removed, but when he heard of this Asquith put it down to "the constant intriguing of that serpent Wilson" whom he and Kitchener were determined to block. Asquith felt he was too Francophile and too fond of "mischief" (political intrigue), but despite Wilson's advising French that the reasons for their objections were largely personal, he was not able to dissuade them from blocking the appointment. On a visit to London in early January Wilson heard from the King's assistant secretary Clive Wigram that it was Asquith rather than Kitchener who was blocking the promotion, which Carson and Law were eager for him to have.

Jeffery argues that there is little specific evidence that Wilson intrigued to replace Murray, simply that he was widely suspected of having done so, and that his pro-French stance was regarded with deep suspicion by other British officers. When Murray was at last removed as chief of staff BEF in January 1915, his job went to the BEF Quartermaster-General "Wully" Robertson. Robertson refused to have Wilson as his deputy, so Wilson was instead appointed Principal Liaison Officer with the French, and promoted to temporary lieutenant general. French technically had no authority to make this promotion, but told Wilson he would resign if the Cabinet or War Office objected. The French had been lobbying so hard for Wilson's appointment that even Sir John thought they should mind their own business. Asquith and Haig both remarked that this was putting Wilson out of mischief.

=== 1915–16 ===
==== Principal Liaison Officer ====
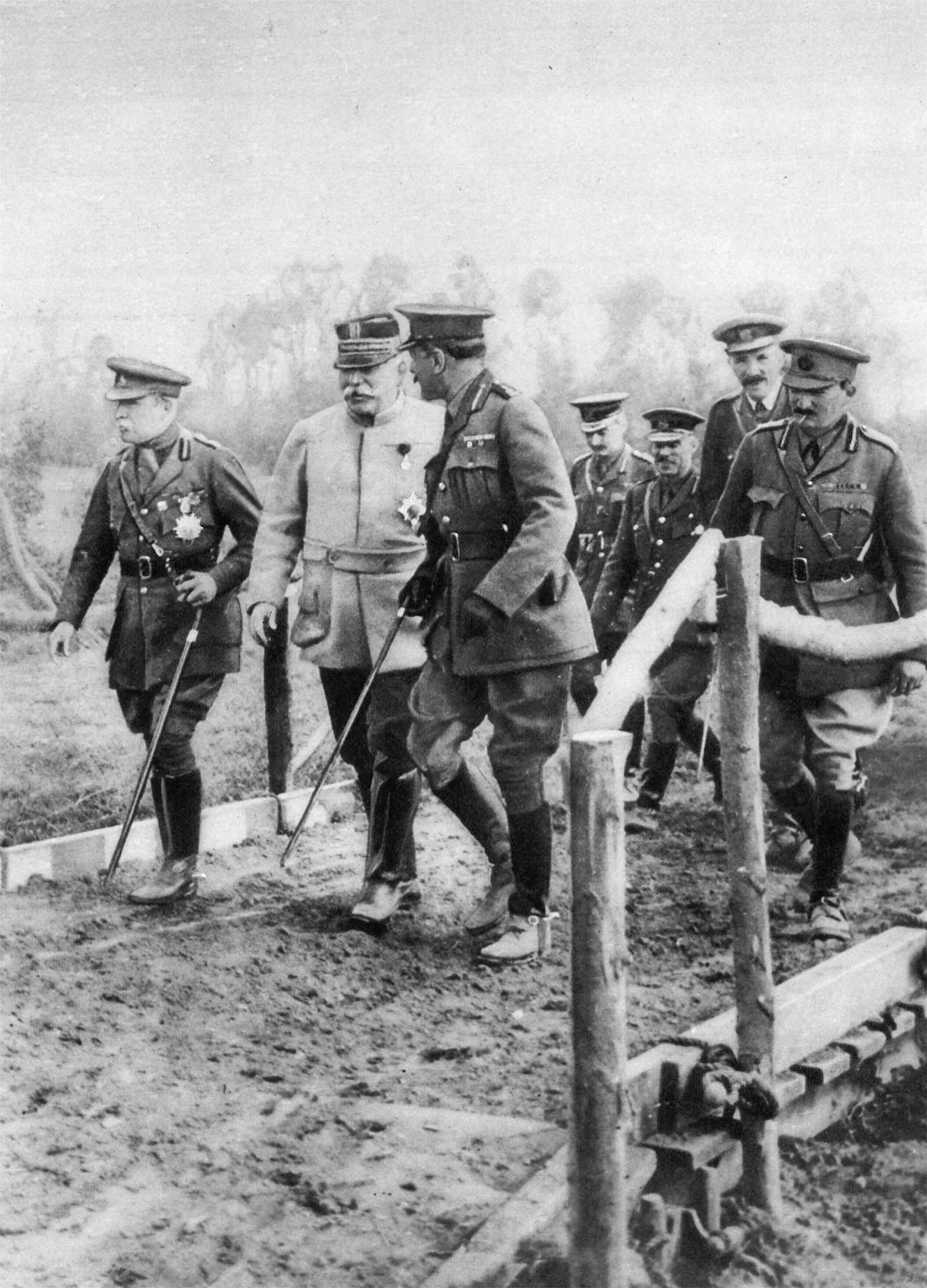
French, Joffre and Haig (left to right) visit the front line during 1915. Henry Wilson is second from the right, Hubert Gough being to his left.

Wilson was "upset by the changes made in his absence" whilst he was touring the French front – Robertson removed Wilson's ally, Brigadier General George Harper. Wilson's diary makes several references to Robertson being "suspicious and hostile" towards him. Wilson was suspected of intriguing for Robertson's removal.

Wilson saw Foch every 2 to 3 days and sometimes smoothed tense meetings by creative (mis)translation. Wilson opposed the Gallipoli Campaign and recorded his anger that, after shells had had to be sent to Gallipoli, the BEF barely had enough High Explosive shell for the Battle of Festubert, which he thought could be "one of the decisive actions of the war".

The failure to achieve quick success at Gallipoli, and the Shell Shortage to which that campaign contributed, led to Conservative ministers joining the new Coalition Government in May, which boosted Wilson's prospects. Wilson was knighted as a Knight Commander of the Order of the Bath in the 1915 Birthday Honours, having been passed over for the honour in February. He was invited to speak at a Cabinet meeting in summer 1915. From July 1915 Asquith and Kitchener began to consult Wilson regularly and his personal relations with both men appear to have become more cordial.

Wilson deplored the botched August Landing at Suvla Bay in Gallipoli, writing that Winston and others should be tried for murder. In the summer of 1915 Wilson believed that the French government might fall, or France seek peace, unless the British committed to the mooted Loos offensive. His efforts to be the main go-between of French and Joffre ended in September 1915, when it was decided that these contacts should go through Sidney Clive. Leo Maxse, Howell Arthur Gwynne and the radical Josiah Wedgwood MP, impressed by Wilson's support for conscription and for the abandonment of Gallipoli, tipped him as a potential CIGS in place of James Wolfe-Murray, but Archibald Murray was appointed instead.

==== Appointment as corps commander ====
After the Battle of Loos, Sir John French's days as commander-in-chief were numbered. William Robertson told the King on 27 October that Wilson should be removed for not being "loyal" – Robertson had earlier criticised Wilson for his closeness to the French. Sir John French, Milner, Lloyd George and Arthur Lee all raised the possibility of Wilson becoming Chief of the Imperial General Staff (CIGS) in place of Murray. Joffre suggested that Wilson should replace Kitchener as Secretary of State for War.

Wilson was also given the honorary appointment of colonel of the Royal Irish Rifles on 11 November 1915, and was made a Commander and later Grand Officier of the Légion d'honneur for his services. Wilson attended the Anglo-French Chantilly Conference (6–8 December 1915) along with Murray (CIGS), French and Robertson, as well as Joffre, Maurice Pellé and Victor Huguet for France, Yakov Zhilinskiy and Ignatieff for Russia, Luigi Cadorna for Italy and a Serb and Belgian representative. Wilson disapproved of large meetings and thought the British and French War Ministers, C-in-Cs and foreign ministers (6 men in total) should meet regularly which might discourage ventures like Antwerp, Gallipoli and Salonika.

With French's "resignation" imminent, Wilson, who appears to have remained loyal to him, attempted to resign and go on half pay (10 December) as he felt he could not serve under Douglas Haig or Robertson; Bonar Law and Charles Edward Callwell attempted to dissuade him. Haig thought this unacceptable for such an able officer in wartime, and Robertson advised him that Wilson would "do less harm" in France than in England. Haig thought (12 December) Wilson should command a division before he commanded a corps, despite his belief that Wilson had criticised himself and other British generals, and had instigated an article in The Observer suggesting that the BEF be placed under General Foch (commander, French Northern Army Group) (John Charteris wrote to his wife (12 December) apropos the articles that "neither DH nor Robertson wants Wilson anywhere near them").

Henry Rawlinson, rumoured to be in line for promotion to succeed Haig as GOC First Army, offered Wilson the chance to succeed him as GOC IV Corps, but Wilson preferred not to serve under Rawlinson, preferring instead the new XIV Corps, part of Allenby's Third Army and including the 36th (Ulster) Division. Asquith summoned Wilson to London and personally offered him a corps, and Kitchener told him the corps command was to be "only temporary pending something better", although Wilson thought impractical his suggestion that he simultaneously continue to perform Anglo-French liaison duties. Jeffery suggests Kitchener may have seen Wilson as a potential ally against Robertson.

Like many Conservatives Wilson was dissatisfied at Asquith's lack of firm leadership and at the delay in bringing in conscription, and from December 1915 he urged Bonar Law to bring down the government (Law refused, pointing out that the resulting General Election would be divisive and the support of Radical and Irish MPs would be lost to the war effort).

==== Corps Commander: spring 1916 ====
Wilson was given command of IV Corps. Given the difference in quality between his divisions, he took a keen interest in training. Like many, Wilson initially thought the Easter Rising (26 April 1916) was German-inspired. Bonar Law tentatively suggested him as a possible commander to put down the Rising, but his Ulster record made this unwise. Wilson hoped the events would lead to Asquith's fall. Wilson thought that the crushing of troublemakers would prevent them infecting the supposed silent Unionist majority, and regretted the removal of General John Maxwell later in the year "to placate that giant fraud Redmond".

Wilson, in temporary command of First Army in Charles Monro's absence from 9 to 22 May, had to take over some more trench from Julian Byng's XVII Corps (part of Allenby's Third Army) opposite Vimy Ridge. Two divisional commanders, William Walker (2nd, sick) and Charles Barter (47th, on leave) were away until 22 May, further disrupting the chain of command as various officers were required to act in their seniors' place. A surprise German attack on the evening of Sunday 21 May moved forward 800 yards, capturing 1,000 yards of the British front line. Wilson appears to have done all he could, arranging the assembly of artillery from First Army and neighbouring Third Army, but the planned counterattack was postponed until 23 May by Monro, who had just returned from leave. At a major meeting at Wilson's HQ (23 May) Monro and Allenby insisted the IV Corps counterattack must proceed, over the objection of John Headlam (artillery) and Tavish Davidson (Director of Military Operations) from GHQ, who passed on Haig's wishes that the counterattack be postponed by a fortnight.

The counterattack failed, as two battalions in the centre found the German shelling too heavy for them to attack, and Monro eventually ordered a halt. Wilson wanted to court martial the two acting battalion commanders for "funk", after hearing the view of one of the actual COs (who had been acting in command of the brigade) that the attack had been feasible. Major Armytage, a staff officer from GHQ, visited the sector on 25 May and reported back that Brigadier-General Kellett (99th Brigade, but acting GOC of 2nd Division) was incompetent and "in complete ignorance of the situation". Haig wrote to Monro (27 May) that Wilson should be asked to explain and that IV Corps, formerly "the most efficient in the army" "had much decreased in military value" and Wilson "had failed as a commander in the field". John Charteris also visited IV Corps HQ on 27 May, and reported back that officers there were "downhearted" and thought the Germans and French better fighters than the British – Wilson later claimed that the officers had been "pulling Charteris' leg" as he talked of "sweeping victories" within two months. Wilson was almost sacked but was saved by a strong report in his favour by Monro. The two acting battalion commanders were not court-martialled, but Kellett was never promoted to command a division. Jeffery argues that Wilson was, like many "unsuccessful" corps commanders, largely in the wrong place at the wrong time, and that Haig's animosity for Wilson was a factor.

==== Corps Commander: summer and autumn 1916 ====
With the major offensive on the Somme imminent, Foch told Wilson in May that until the Allies had far more guns and ammunition such an attack was "suicidal", worries which were shared by Georges Clemenceau. Like many British generals, Wilson was overly impressed by the amount of artillery available.

In August Richard Haking, Wilson's junior and a favourite of Haig, was made acting Army commander when Monro left to become Commander-in-Chief, India. Wilson claimed in his diary that Monro had recommended him to command First Army but this was vetoed by Haig. Despite the hopes of his many political friends Wilson was blocked from further promotion.

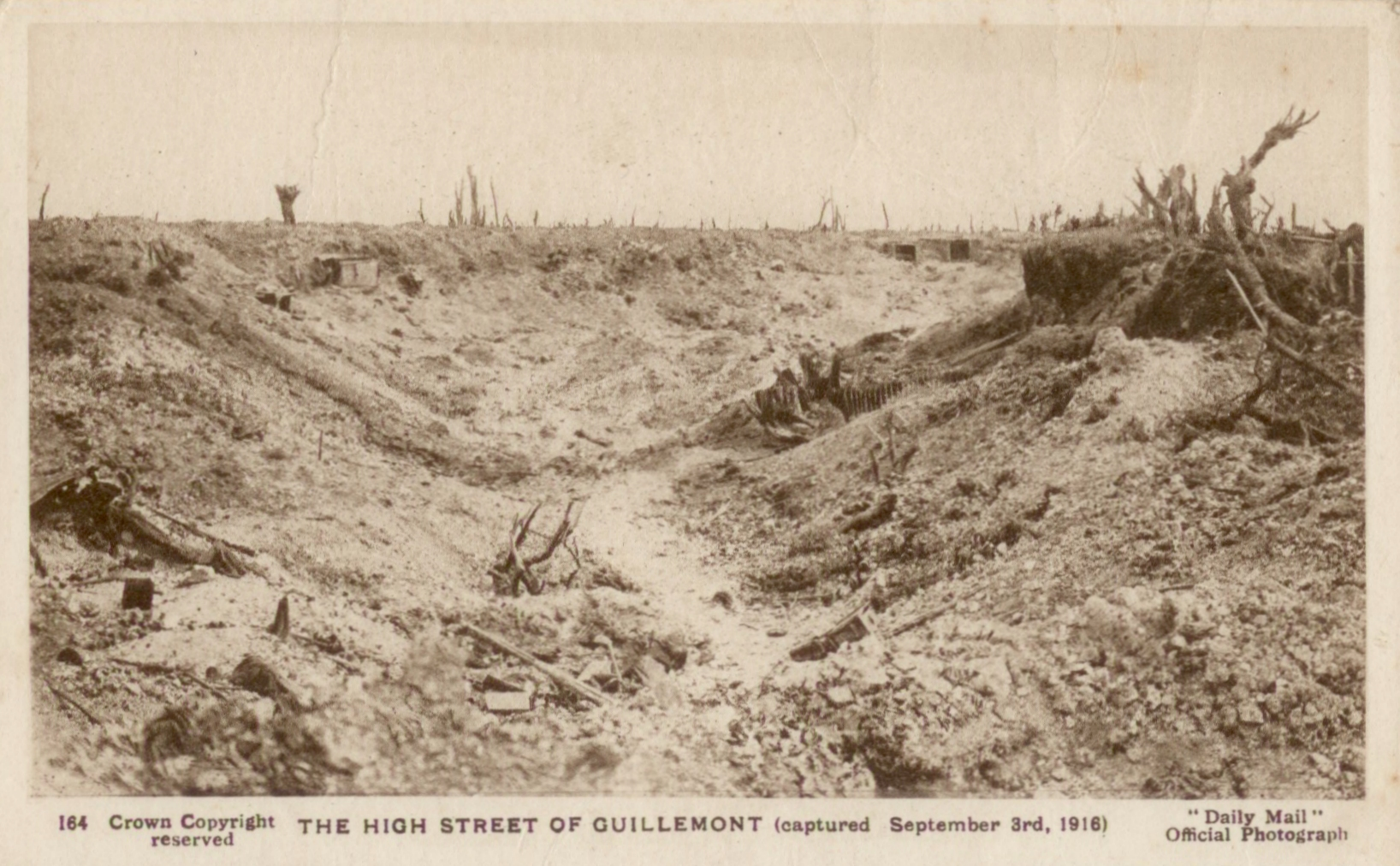
The captured High Street at Guillemont

By August Wilson had two elite divisions under his command, 63rd (Royal Naval) Division and 9th (Scottish) Division, but resisted pressure from Haig to conduct another attack until after 1 September. Wilson was aware that the greater success of French attacks on the Somme was largely owed to more concentrated artillery fire, and that British attacks at High Wood and Guillemont (late July) were less successful. It was decided to use a short traditional bombardment rather than a gas attack, and Wilson's men experimented (in vain) with a flamethrower (in May he had been impressed by an explosive device, a sort of prototype Bangalore torpedo, to clear wire). Wilson was displeased at the poor state of air support but impressed by the early artillery sound ranging device which he was shown. With Haig convinced he was going to "smash the Bosh on the Somme" in September, GHQ now postponed Wilson's attack until October, and now wanted the whole of Vimy Ridge taken, which would mean a joint attack with XVII Corps. Some of Wilson's artillery was moved down to the Somme. Wilson continued to work on air-artillery coordination and mining, but rejected a proposal to dig jumping-off trenches into No Mans Land, as this would give away the attack.

In September 1916 Lloyd George, now Secretary of State for War, visited the Western Front and asked Wilson why the British had performed so much more poorly than the French on the Somme. Wilson stressed the inexperience of the British Army. On his visit Lloyd George had been told (falsely) that Wilson had not wanted to counterattack in May.

Wilson then had the 63rd and 9th Divisions taken away, then (10 October) heard his whole corps was to be transferred to Hubert Gough's Reserve Army, a prospect which did not please him. In October Gough "hauled him over the coals over the state of IV Corps". By 18 October IV Corps had no divisions at all, and Wilson had to take 2 weeks leave in the UK in early November. Edmonds later wrote that Wilson's preparations had laid the foundations for the successful capture of Vimy Ridge in April 1917.

Wilson thought that "to slog on at one spot" on the Somme was "dreadfully lacking in imagination" and would have preferred a joint offensive by Russia, Italy and Romania in Spring 1917 to draw off 15 or 20 German divisions, allowing the BEF to "completely smash the Boch line". Summoned to see Lloyd George (13 November 1916) and asked if Britain could still hope to defeat Germany, Wilson advised him that she could, provided Haig were given enough men to fight "two Sommes at once", but that in reality Haig should be firmly told how many men he was to receive and told to plan accordingly. He thought at the end of 1916 that both sides were claiming victory from that year's fighting, but victory "inclined to us", and that Germany might be driven to sue for peace in 1917.

=== 1917 ===
==== Mission to Russia ====
Lloyd George's accession to the premiership (December 1916) restarted Wilson's career. In January 1917 Wilson accompanied Lloyd George to a conference at Rome. Despite the growing alliance between Wilson and the Prime Minister, Wilson agreed with Robertson that British heavy guns should not be sent to Italy or to the Salonika front.

Lloyd George wanted Russia persuaded to make the maximum possible effort. Wilson was sent on a British mission to Russia in January 1917, the object of which was to keep the Russians holding down at least the forces now opposite them, to boost Russian morale and see what equipment they needed with a view to coordinating attacks. The party of 50 included British (led by Milner), French (led by de Castelnau) and Italian delegations. The War Office briefing advised that Russia was close to revolution. Wilson met the Tsar but thought him "as devoid of character & purpose as our own poor miserable King". Even senior Russian officials were talking openly of assassinating the Tsar or perhaps just the Tsarina. He toured Petrograd, Moscow (where he was concerned at the food shortages) and Riga, and thought that even if the Tsar and Tsarina were assassinated, Russia would not make a separate peace. His official report (3 March) said that Russia would remain in the war and that they would solve their "administrative chaos". Many other observers at the time felt that the advent of democracy in Russia would reinvigorate her war effort.

==== Chief of British Mission, French Army ====
During the Calais Affair (whilst Wilson was away in Russia) Lloyd George had attempted to sideline Haig, whilst Robert Nivelle, the French commander-in-chief (who spoke fluent English), would exercise operational command of the British Forces, through a British staff officer – Wilson was probably earmarked for this job. This plan fell through after Haig and Robertson threatened resignation. Wilson confessed to Secretary of State for War Edward Stanley, 17th Earl of Derby that he did not get on with Haig or Robertson and told Robertson he wanted to return to commanding a corps. Hankey brokered an agreement whereby Haig would be subordinate to Nivelle only for the duration of the coming offensive and Wilson would do the liaison job but reporting to Haig. Wilson was appointed Chief of British Mission to the French Army on 17 March, with a promotion to permanent lieutenant-general which Robertson had blocked in November 1916. Gough wrote a damning letter to Lord Stamfordham (i.e. for the King to see) complaining of how Wilson had made little impact either as a staff officer in 1914 or as a corps commander, but had a great reputation throughout the army for intrigue and for "talk". However, the appointment was welcomed by Curzon, and the King and Esher also urged Haig and Robertson to accept the deal.

The new French War Minister Paul Painlevé had a low opinion of Nivelle's plan to achieve a decisive "rupture", and after it failed he clearly wanted to sack Nivelle (contrary to Wilson's advice on 26 April) and replace him with Philippe Pétain, who favoured abstaining from major offensives until the Americans were present in strength. Wilson did not agree with this, although the alternatives were whirlwind attacks like those Nivelle had launched at Verdun in late 1916 or – Wilson's preference – a major attritional offensive like the Somme but "with intelligence". He compared "the school of the Great Offensive, of large numbers on long fronts, for unlimited objectives" with the alternative of small and sudden offensives, and opined that "both schools were wrong, and have been proved wrong over and over again". He urged "a middle course of big operations on long fronts for limited objectives" which would cause "maximum of damage to the enemy with a minimum of loss to ourselves" and keep the Germans "in a state of constant tension and anxiety". (30 April 1917). Wilson was pleased with the promotion of his friend Foch to be French chief of staff but not the promotion of Pétain as French commander-in-chief (10 May) – Wilson was seen as pro-Nivelle and Pétain soon began to deal directly with Haig, leaving little justification for Wilson's job.

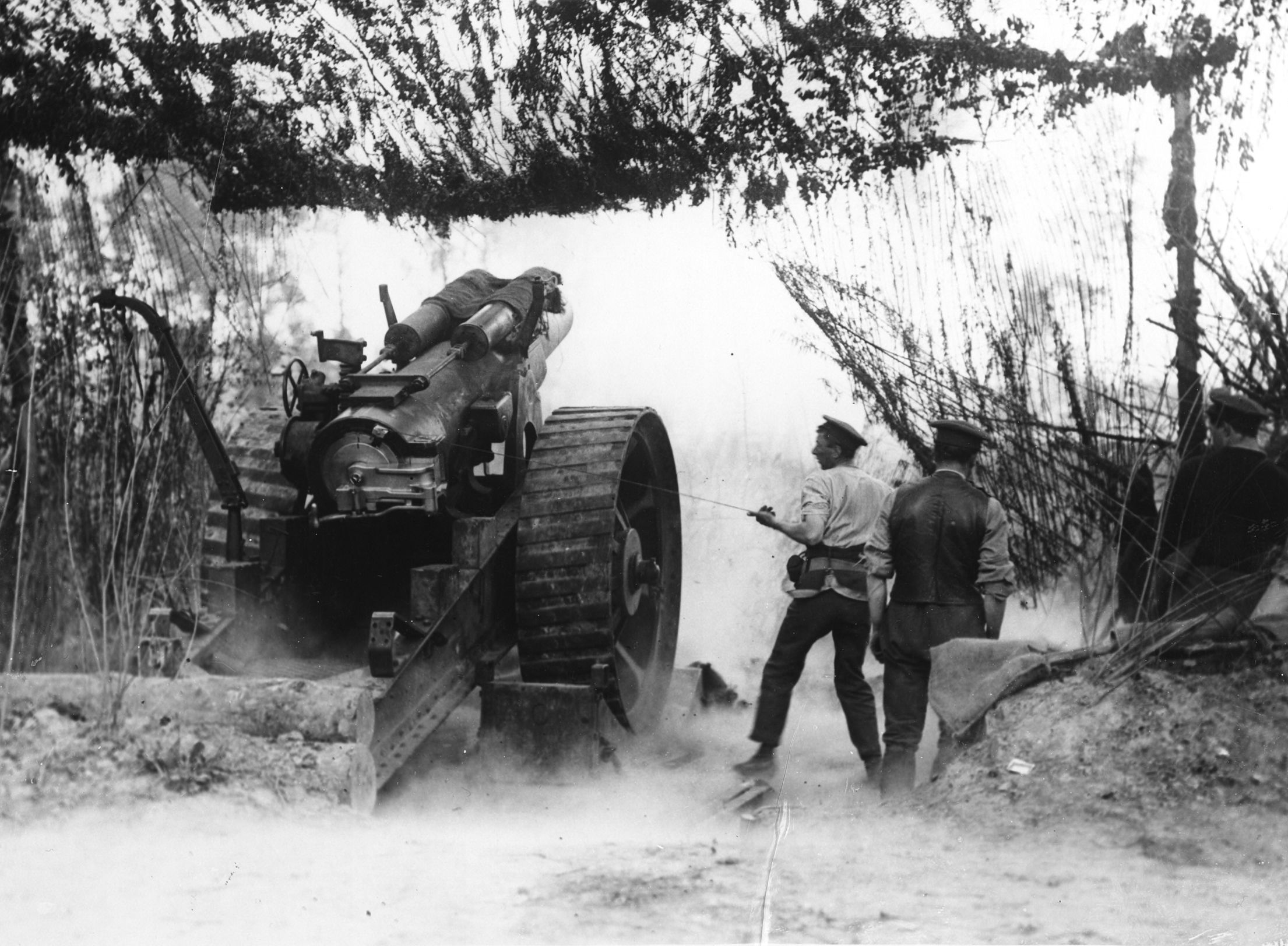
A howitzer at the Battle of Messines

Robertson suggested once again that Wilson should return to commanding a corps, but Foch thought this a poor use of his talents. Haig's diary states that Painlevé had told Lloyd George that Wilson was no longer persona grata with the French government. Wilson returned to London to sound out opinion about resigning and nobody tried to dissuade him. Whilst he was in London Lloyd George asked him to brief the War cabinet individually then collectively with his advice that Britain try for some military or diplomatic success to drive Turkey or Bulgaria out of the war. On return to France Wilson declined Haig's offer to command XIII Corps. Wilson then took a tour of the French line all the way down to the Swiss frontier, and was concerned that revolution seemed a possibility in France. He attempted to get a final interview with Painlevé but left after being kept waiting in a lobby with "a pronounced whore". He had a meeting with Haig, who was encouraged by the recent success at Messines, and agreed with Haig's plan for a major offensive in Flanders provided the weather remained favourable (Wilson was "absolutely convinced that we should attack all we could right up to the time of the mud") .

==== Possible entry into politics ====
The fall of Wilson's ally Nivelle, and his awkward relations with his successor Pétain and with Haig and Robertson (he thought the latter were "dunderheads") left Wilson without a post. Shuttling between England and France in June 1917, Wilson contemplated standing for Parliament. Back in 1916 the chairman of the Conservative Party Arthur Steel-Maitland had offered to get him a seat. Esher and Lord Duncannon proposed forming a new "National" party of 20–30 MPs. The new party's policies would include more vigorous prosecution of the war – Wilson urged the extension of conscription to Ireland – and the detachment of Turkey and Bulgaria. Wilson was worried that it would be the end of his army career and was short of money. His brother Jemmy proposed getting him an Ulster seat, and thought that the prospect of Wilson as an MP would annoy Robertson, but the Irish Unionist leader Carson thought an English seat more sensible. Bonar Law was dismissive of Wilson's hopes that, like Jan Smuts, he might be invited to join the War Policy Committee, and also poured cold water on the idea of Wilson becoming an MP. Wilson did not agree with Milner's suggestion that he succeed Maurice Sarrail as commander-in-chief at Salonika. Éamon de Valera of Sinn Féin had recently won the East Clare by-election and on a visit to Currygrane (his first in eight years) everyone Wilson spoke to – judges, landowners, police officers, a Redmondite local politician and "some natives" agreed on the need for Irish conscription. Wilson, a lifelong Unionist, seems not to have anticipated the political consequences of such a move.

Brock Millman argues that the threat to stand for Parliament, where he could have intrigued as a Unionist along with his friends such as Bonar Law, Leo Amery and Colonel Lord Percy, ADC to the King, was blackmail to get a military job out of Lloyd George. Keith Jeffery rejects Millman's approach, arguing that Wilson would have been no threat as a new MP but as a military adviser was a useful rival to Robertson. However, Robertson told Wilson directly in a meeting on 4 July that there was simply no job available for him. Moreover, Wilson was surprised to learn that if he entered the House of Commons he would lose his army half pay.

==== Eastern Command ====
With the Third Battle of Ypres, to which the War Cabinet had reluctantly agreed on condition that it did not degenerate into a long-drawn out fight like the Somme, already bogged down in unseasonably early wet weather, Viscount French (14 August 1917) told George Riddell (managing director of the News of the World, and likely to pass on French's views to Lloyd George) that Henry Wilson's talents were being wasted, and that the government was not ascertaining "the views of our leading soldiers". Wilson thought "ridiculous and unworkable" a suggestion by Lloyd George that all Robertson's plans be submitted to a committee of French, Wilson and one other, and over lunch with French and Lloyd George on 23 August suggested an inter-Allied body of three Prime Ministers and three soldiers be set up over all the national Staffs. Lloyd George agreed, telling Wilson that he should be the British military member, and told him to sell the plan to the rest of the War Cabinet. Wilson also suggested that the autumn and winter mud in Flanders would be an ideal time to build on recent successes in Palestine and Mesopotamia without interfering with Western Front Offensives in 1918.

In late August 1917 Wilson turned down a chance to go on the mission to the US, as he did not get on with Lord Northcliffe, the mission leader. He took up Eastern Command, whose headquarters were conveniently at 50 Pall Mall in London, on 1 September 1917, enabling him to work closely with Lloyd George.

The War Cabinet (11 October 1917) invited Wilson and French to submit formal written advice, a blatant undermining of Robertson's position. Dining with Wilson and French the night before, Lloyd George criticised Robertson and called Haig's recent paper (8 October), which predicted that "decisive success is expected next year" provided Russia continued to pin down as many German divisions as currently, "preposterous". Wilson consulted George Macdonogh (Director of Military Intelligence at the War Office) who held out little prospect of breaking the German Army but thought "the heart of the German people" might break in a year, and Nevil Macready (Adjutant-General) who warned that the British Army was facing a shortfall of 300,000 men by that time. Over lunch on 17 October Lloyd George wanted Wilson's paper rewritten to remove "all semblance of dictation" by the new inter-Allied body. Wilson thought Haig's assumption that Russia would continue to fight was "a large one" and once again urged winter offensives against Turkey and Bulgaria. He affirmed that he was in principle a "Westerner" but wrote that it was "no use throwing "decisive numbers at the decisive time at the decisive place" if "the decisive numbers do not exist, the decisive hour has not yet struck and if the decisive place is ill-chosen" ". Winston Churchill later wrote "In Sir Henry Wilson the War Cabinet found for the first time an expert advisor of superior intellect, who could explain lucidly and forcefully the whole situation and give reasons for the adoption or rejection of any course".

Wilson delivered copies of the two papers to Hankey on 20 October; on 24 October Wilson breakfasted with Derby, who warned him that he had not yet submitted the papers as French's was "too personal" and Wilson's "too unanswerable". At the Prime Minister's request Wilson helped tone down French's criticisms of Robertson. On 26 October papers were at last sent to the CIGS, having been overtaken by disaster on the Italian front. The Battle of Caporetto began on 24 October, which Wilson was worried might lead to revolution in Italy.

==== Supreme War Council ====
Lloyd George told Wilson that he was to be the British Military Representative on the Supreme War Council, and that although he disliked his politics he admired him "as a man & a soldier" and that the future of the war rested in his shoulders – Milner told him much the same, adding that it was "the eleventh hour". Hankey also wrote to Lloyd George that Wilson was uniquely qualified for the job, owing in part to his close relations with the French Army and personal friendship with Foch. Wilson accompanied Lloyd George, Smuts and Hankey to the Rapallo Conference which set up the SWC (7 November). When he arrived on 5 November he met Robertson who had gone on ahead to supervise the transfer of British reinforcements to Italy – under questioning from Wilson Robertson said that he would not have done anything differently over the last two years – which Wilson thought "curious", noting that "since he has been CIGS we have lost Roumania, Russia & Italy & have gained Bullecourt, Messines & Paschendal [sic]".

Wilson, sent to inspect the Italian Front, was worried that Venice might fall and on behalf of the SWC ordered the new Italian commander Armando Diaz to construct new defensive positions on the River Brenta, which in the event were not needed as the line of the River Piave held.

Lloyd George persuaded the War Cabinet that although Wilson was subject to the authority of the Army Council he should nonetheless have "unfettered" discretion as to the advice he gave. Wilson insisted to Robertson that there was no "duality of advice" as he spoke only on behalf of the SWC. Lloyd George also asked Wilson to send his reports directly to him, not through Robertson. On the train to the initial SWC meeting at the Hotel Trianon at Versailles Lloyd George, Milner and Wilson had "long talks" about Derby and Robertson's obstruction. Wilson correctly guessed that Foch would eventually become Allied generalissimo. Clemenceau was in the chair (1 December 1917), and his speech, drafted by Hankey, tasked the military representatives with studying the prospects for the 1918 campaign, and in particular whether German defeat would be best brought about by attacks on her allies.

At the time, Allenby's successes, culminating in the Fall of Jerusalem (9 December 1917), demonstrated the potential of attacks in the Middle East, compared to Haig's offensives at Ypres and at Cambrai in November (initial British success followed by German retaking of gains). Russia had finally collapsed (Armistice 15 December) yet only a handful of American divisions were available so far in the west. But with hindsight, it is unclear that stronger commitment to the Palestine front in the winter of 1917–18 would have led to great results, as that winter saw some of the heaviest rain in the region in living memory. Conversely, the success of the 1918 German spring offensives demonstrated that the Western Front was not as secure as Wilson believed.

In December 1917 Wilson was given the temporary rank of general.

The military representatives, egged on by Wilson, beginning 13 December 1917, recommended coordinated defence and reserves from the North Sea to the Adriatic, as well as reorganisation of the Belgian Army and preparing studies of the Italian and Salonika fronts. Wilson worked even on Christmas Day. He set up three main sections "Allied" and "Enemy" operations, and "Material and Manpower" – the latter under Frederick Sykes covered both sides and included air power. There was also a "Political" Branch under Leo Amery, although he reported to Hankey back in London. However, Rawlinson was unimpressed by the calibre of Wilson's staff and the young Archibald Wavell thought the atmosphere overly pessimistic. That month Wilson defended Haig to Clemenceau and Foch, both of whom wanted him removed (Clemenceau preferred Allenby as Haig's replacement, Foch preferred Herbert Plumer), telling Clemenceau that Haig was the right man for the "bad times" which were coming, although he was critical of Robertson.

Wilson had his staff play a "war game", in which some of them had reversed their hats pretending to be German, which he demonstrated to important visitors and the contents of which became Joint Note 12. Wilson advised that the British line should be extended between the River Ailette and the Soissons-Laon Road. Haig was bored when shown it (11 January 1918) and read a memorandum in his hand, although a large part of the reason for setting up the SWC had been the poor intelligence and advice which Haig had been receiving from Charteris. Many of Wilson's predictions for the timing and location of the German offensive proved to be wrong. Although Lloyd George would later (9 April) praise Wilson in the House of Commons for forecasting the date and time of the German offensive, he had in fact explicitly rejected the Somme as a sector and had predicted that 1 May or later would be the likely date of the attack.

SWC Joint Note 12 declared that, leaving aside improbables such as the Central Powers internally collapsing or Russian revival, neither side could win a decisive victory on the Western Front in 1918, although decisive results could be had against Turkey (although, at French insistence, no further troops were to be sent), possibly leading to diversion of German troops and encouragement of pro-Allied elements in Romania and southern Russia. Haig thought "Wilson is playing the tune called by Lloyd George" and Robertson, who opposed efforts against Turkey, thought it "d-----d rot in general". Joint Note 12 and Note 14 proposing the formation of a General Reserve were discussed at the second full session of the SWC (30 January – 2 February). In accordance with Lloyd George's wishes an Executive Board was set up to control the General Reserve, under Foch (with Wilson as his deputy). Robertson asked to be on the board but was overruled. Wilson for the first time (2 February 1918) wrote explicitly in his diary of "the long duel between (himself) and Robertson" and speculated that Robertson might resign after his "complete defeat".

Wilson seems from his diary not to have particularly welcomed the suggestion that he become CIGS. When told by Milner of rumours that he was to be given Robertson's job he said that he preferred to be given ever more power at Versailles where he was building up a prestigious post for himself, with Robertson reduced "from the position of a Master to that of a servant". Milner told Wilson (10 February) that Lloyd George wanted to move Robertson to Versailles. Ironically, if he became CIGS he wanted Robertson (whom he thought would refuse) or whoever else replaced him at Versailles to report to himself. There was talk of the government falling, Rawlinson writing to H. A. Gwynne (14 February 1918) that the best solution was to give Robertson a powerful role at Versailles and have Wilson as a weak CIGS in London "where he will not be able to do much mischief – especially if Squiff replaced LG as PM".

=== Chief of the Imperial General Staff: 1918 ===
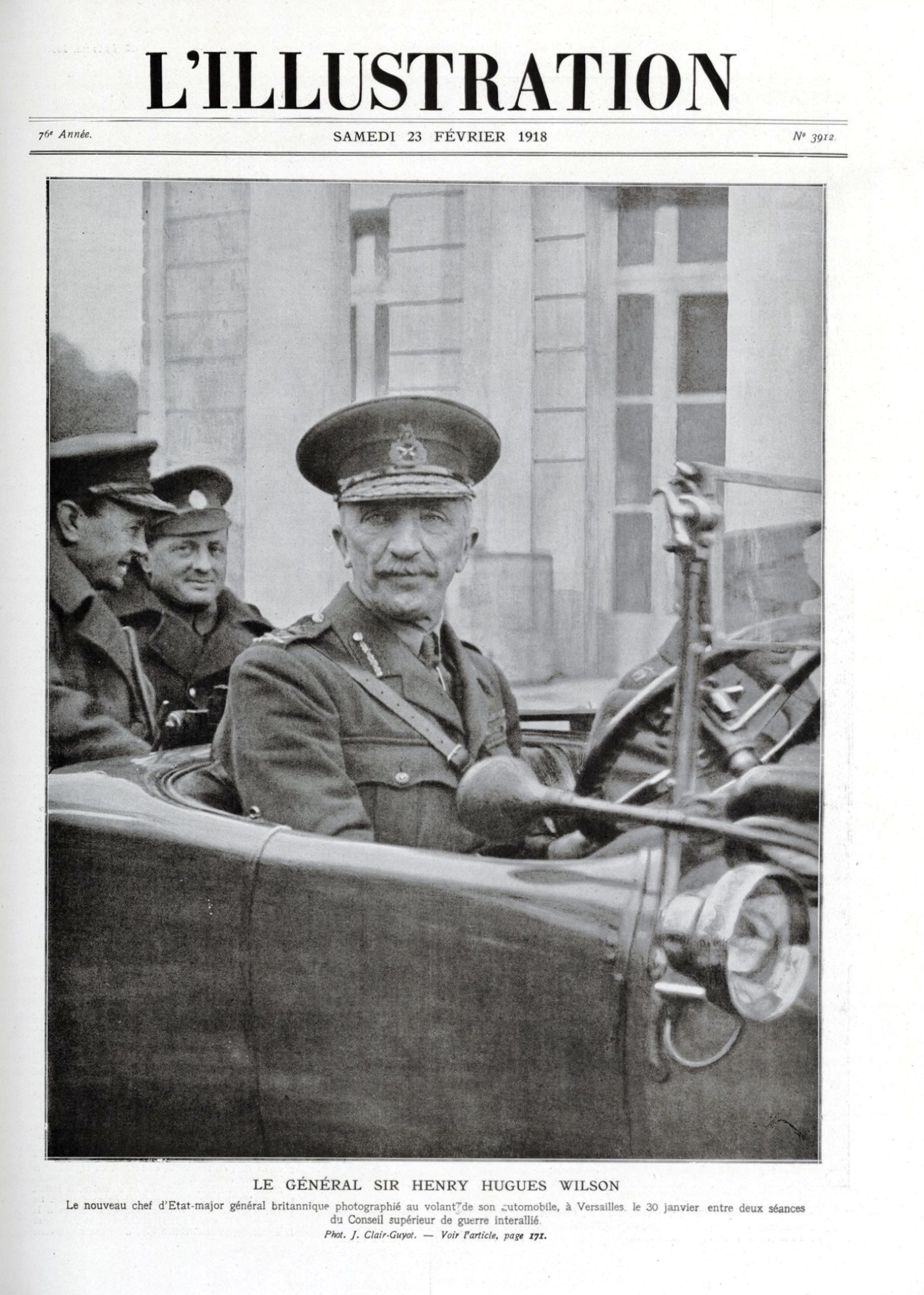
L'Illustration magazine, showing General Henry Wilson, February 23, 1918

==== German March offensive ====
On 19 February 1918 Wilson was appointed Chief of the Imperial General Staff ('CIGS'), and was the principal military adviser to Lloyd George in the last year of the war. As CIGS, he was a member of the Army Council. One of his first acts was to nearly triple the size of the Tank Corps from 18,000 to 46,000 men He argued for "turning out some of our senior generals & starting a flow of promotion". A purge of corps commanders, including the corps commanders from the Battle of Cambrai (William Pulteney, Thomas Snow and Charles Woollcombe), was carried out in early 1918.

In the House of Commons in early April Lloyd George would later claim, amidst press demands for Robertson's restoration to office, that Wilson had predicted exactly when and where the German offensive would come. In fact on 21 March the day the German Michael Offensive began, Wilson advised that the attack "might only develop into a big raid or demonstration" and focussed the War Cabinet on the German threat to Asia. Although it was not yet clear in London, on that one day the Germans captured as much territory as the British had captured in 140 days at the Somme in 1916.

On 23 March Walter Kirke, deputy director of operations at GHQ, flew to London to report that the Germans had gained 12 miles and captured 600 guns. Wilson wrote that 23 March was "an anxious day": the War Cabinet discussed falling back on the Channel Ports and agreed to send out 50,000 "boys" of 18 ½ – 19 together with another 82,000 men from Britain, along with 88,000 returning from leave. A British division was recalled from Italy, Allenby was instructed to hold another division ready, and Lord Reading (Ambassador in Washington) was asked to urge President Woodrow Wilson to send US reinforcements quicker.

Wilson's diary records that on 24 March he had a meeting with Lloyd George at Downing Street where they discussed "the entirely inadequate measures taken by Haig and Pétain" before receiving an evening message from Haig asking him to come over. There is no evidence to confirm Haig's later claim that, on returning from a midnight meeting with Pétain at 3am on 25 March, he telegraphed to Wilson and Milner to come over to France and ensure the appointment of "Foch or some other determined general who would fight" as Allied Generalissimo. Wilson reached GHQ at Montreuil at 11.30am on 25 March, having left London by special train at 6.50am then crossed to France on a destroyer. He chided Haig for having, together with Pétain, blocked the plan for an Allied reserve, although in fact Pétain sent a dozen divisions and it is unclear that a committee would actually have acted any faster. Travers argued that the true reason for Wilson's visit to France was to discuss a retreat on the Channel Ports, but this view is not accepted by other scholars.

Wilson was present at the Doullens Conference at which Foch was appointed Allied generalissimo. He reported (27 March) that Gough's Fifth Army could "no longer be regarded as a fighting unit". He was also at the Beauvais Conference (3 April) which increased Foch's powers.

==== Spring battles ====
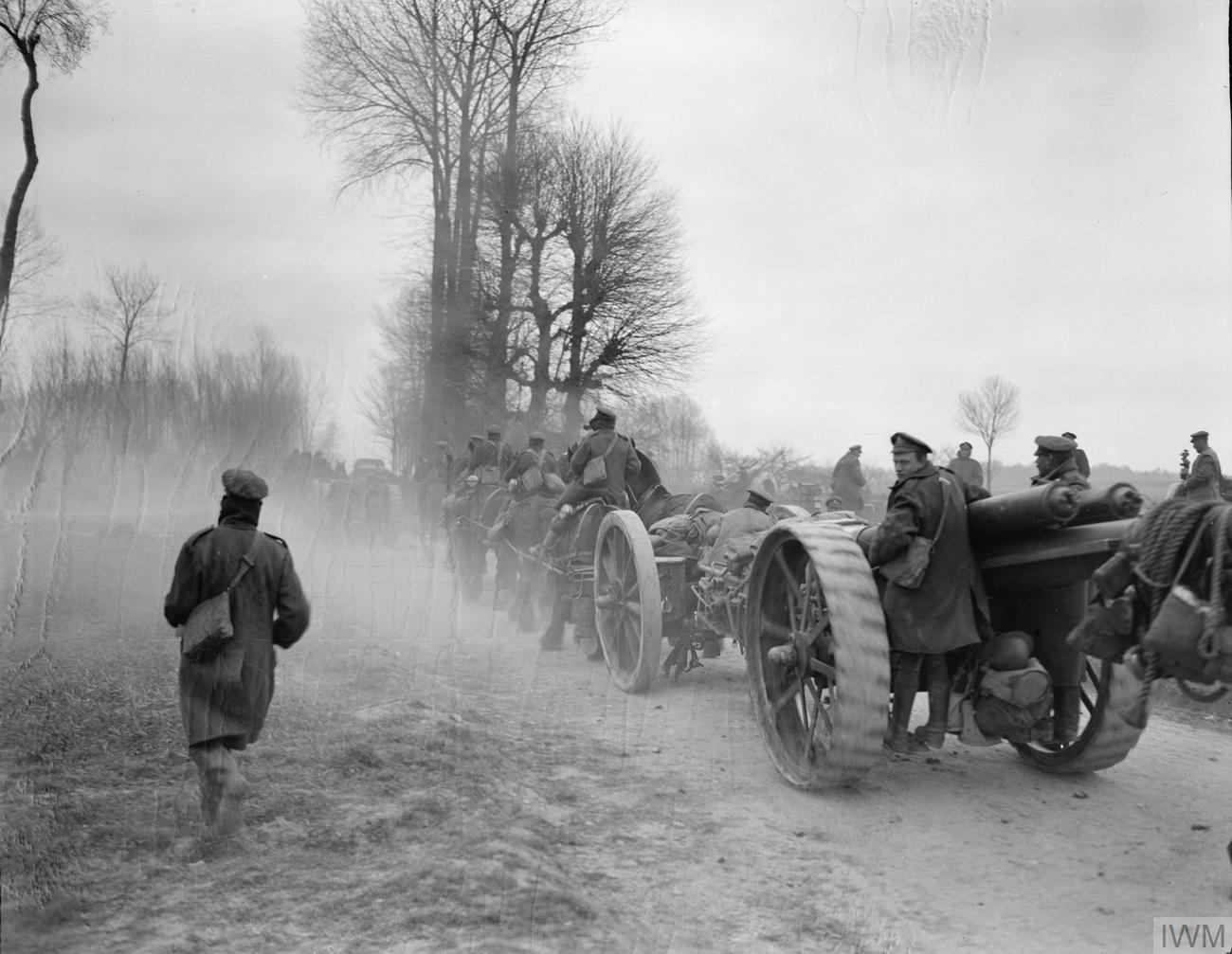
Operation Michael: British troops retreat, March 1918

Wilson thought that Irish conscription would gain an extra 150,000 men, as well as helping to round up political malcontents. As recently as January Lloyd George had been opposed, worried that it would cause trouble in Ireland and weaken the position of John Redmond's party and about the effect on Irish American and Irish Australian opinion. During the German "Michael" Offensive Lloyd George changed his mind and with Milner's support, but over the reservations of the head of the Royal Irish Constabulary, announced at the War Cabinet that conscription was to be extended to Ireland, partly to placate British trade unions at the extension of conscription to British war industries. When he announced the measure in the House of Commons (9 April), he announced that Home Rule was also to be introduced in Ireland, although Wilson was convinced that the southern nationalists would never accept it if Ulster was given the "safeguards" promised by Lloyd George. Irish conscription was never implemented but the threat galvanised Irish politics and led to Sinn Féin's victory in December 1918.

The War Cabinet met to discuss, in Hankey's words, "the desirability of getting rid of Haig", who had recently offered to resign. Hankey recorded that sentiment was "unanimously against Haig" but Wilson's opinion was that there was no obvious successor and that he suggested waiting for Haig's report on the March retreat before making a decision. However, in his own diary Wilson later claimed (11 May) he had urged that Haig be sacked. Haig and Wilson gradually established a warily respectful relationship.

The German "Georgette" Offensive began on 9 April. Wilson travelled to France and that day he met with Haig and then with Foch, with whom he broached the idea of appointing Lt-Gen John Du Cane as liaison officer between the two (this would take effect on 12 April). Wilson met Clemenceau in Paris the next morning (10 April) to warn that there was a danger of the BEF losing the Channel ports. He also wrote to Foch (10 April) urging him to send French reinforcements or to flood the coastal areas around Dunkirk, and impressing on him the need to keep contact with the British right flank if the BEF felt compelled to retreat on the Channel Ports. At a meeting with Clemenceau, Foch, Milner and Haig on 27 April, Wilson pressed Foch on whether the priority was to hold onto the Channel ports or to keep the British and French armies united was priority. Foch indicated that the latter was the priority. Reassured by the British Admiralty that if necessary Calais and Boulogne could be abandoned, Wilson finally agreed (2 May 1918) that the British could retreat south-west if attacked again, but this decision never had to be implemented.

Like many British leaders, Wilson soon became disillusioned with Foch. In May 1918 he complained that the French wanted to get control of the British Army, bases, food, merchant marine, and the Italian and Salonika fronts.

==== Summer battles ====
Wilson, along with Milner and Hankey, was on the X Committee, an inner circle which met to brief Lloyd George prior to War Cabinet meetings. Wilson travelled to France four times, seeing Foch and Haig each time and Clemenceau on three of them. Wilson ordered detailed planning to begin for a potential evacuation of the BEF; the British Embassy in Paris packed up much of their archive in case evacuation was required.

Wilson attended the sixth meeting of the Supreme War Council in Paris, 1–3 June, at which there was much French anger at the low level of British recruitment and Haig's reluctance to send reinforcements to the French sector.

Wilson was promoted to substantive general on 3 June 1918. Along with Hankey and Milner, Wilson attended an emergency meeting at 10 Downing Street on 5 June, at which abandonment of the Channel Ports or even evacuation was discussed. Wilson also attended the Paris conference of 7 June, at which Foch again berated Haig for his reluctance to send reinforcements. Wilson helped to defuse the situation by obtaining a promise from Foch that the British and French Armies would not be separated as Pétain had assured him that Paris was no longer in danger. At the end of June Lloyd George asked Milner if Britain could continue the war without France. Wilson visited Italy again at the end of June 1918.

For some time the Supreme War Council had been drawing up contingency plans to supply the BEF via Dieppe and Le Havre if Calais and Boulogne fell, or even emergency evacuation plans. Wilson submitted a long paper to the War Cabinet in July, recommending that the Allies hold the line, with only limited offensives, for the second half of 1918, and that their future offensives should have ever greater emphasis on artillery, tanks, aircraft and machine guns. He was convinced that the war would ultimately be won in the west. In his War Memoirs Lloyd George later poured scorn on Wilson for seeking the advice of Haig and Pétain in this paper and for not having foreseen the Allied victories of autumn 1918. Wilson also dismissed as unlikely the internal collapse which overcame the Central Powers in late 1918. Wilson also wanted to reinforce the Near East – although not enough to satisfy Amery – lest Germany and Turkey were left free by the collapse of Russia to expand there, which would improve their position in any future war a decade hence. Haig wrote on his copy "words, words, words" and "theoretical rubbish".

==== Allied victory ====
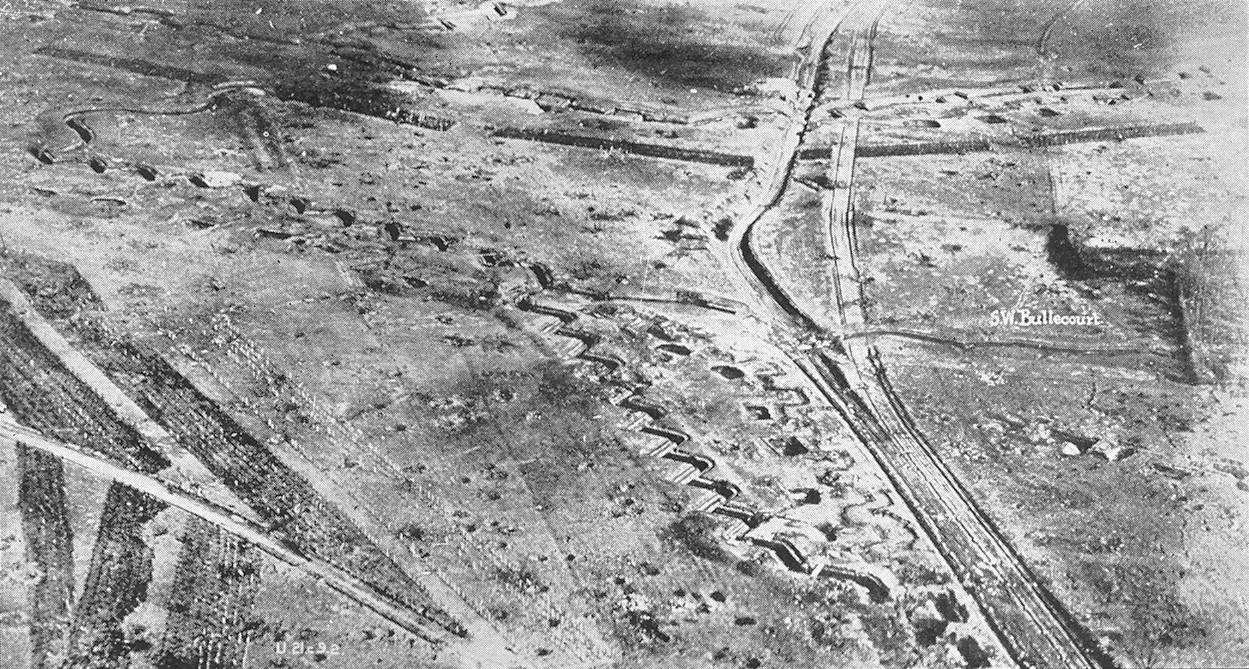
The Hindenburg line at Bullecourt at end of the War

When Haig's forces began to advance towards the Hindenburg Line Wilson sent him a supposedly "personal" telegram (31 August), warning that he was not to take unnecessary losses in storming these fortifications (i.e. hinting that he might be sacked if he failed), later claiming that the government wanted to retain troops in the UK because of the police strike.

Haig believed that the aim should be to win the war that year, and by spring 1919 at the latest, not July 1919 as the politicians had in mind, and urged that all available able-bodied men and transportation in the UK be sent, as well as men earmarked for the Royal Navy and for munitions production, even at the cost of reducing future munitions output. Milner warned Haig that manpower would not be available for 1919 if squandered now. Although Wilson agreed with Haig that "there was ample evidence of the deterioration of the Boch" (Wilson diary 9 September) Milner told Wilson that Haig was being "ridiculously optimistic", might "embark on another Paschendal [sic]" and that he "had grave doubts whether he had got inside of DH's head" (Wilson diary 23 September); Wilson thought the War Cabinet would have to "watch this tendency & stupidity of DH".

Wilson was appointed a Knight Grand Cross of the Order of the Bath (GCB) on 17 December 1918.

== Postwar Chief of the Imperial General Staff ==
=== Demobilisation and defence cuts ===
In January 1919 there were riots as 10,000 soldiers at Folkestone and 2,000 at Dover refused to return abroad, as well as disturbances in army camps abroad. This was of grave concern as revolution in Russia and Germany had been spearheaded by mutinous soldiers. Wilson blamed Lloyd George for promising quick demobilisation during the 1918 election, and estimating that 350,000–500,000 men would be needed for peacekeeping duties, pressed for the continuation of conscription. Churchill (now War Secretary) replaced the plans for demobilisation of men with jobs to go to with a new system of "first in, first out", and extended service for the most recent conscripts until April 1920.

The Army dropped in size from 3.8 million (November 1918) to 430,000 (November 1920). Lloyd George, wanting to spend more money on domestic programmes and concerned at persuading an electorate recently tripled in size that high defence spending was needed, launched a defence review in summer 1919. He wanted to know why, with no major enemies on the horizon, so many more men were needed than in 1914 when the Army had numbered 255,000. Defence spending was £766m in 1919–20; this was to be reduced to £135m. Wilson supported the Ten Year Rule which was also formulated at this time.

=== Versailles Treaty ===
Wilson, at this stage still enjoying cordial relations with Lloyd George, was Britain's chief military adviser at the Paris Peace Conference. Wilson advised that the German Reichswehr be a voluntary rather than a conscript force (the French preference), and that the French Occupation of the Rhineland be temporary rather than permanent. Hankey was impressed by advice from Wilson that harsh financial terms might drive Germany to Bolshevism and thence to alliance with Russia and Japan, and had Wilson repeat his presentation to the Prime Minister at a special "away weekend" at Fontainebleau (March 1919), where he was sceptical of the League of Nations and urged a strong Anglo-French Alliance. These proposals were written up as the "Fontainebleau Memorandum" outlining Lloyd George's preferred peace terms. Clemenceau eventually agreed to sign the Treaty of Versailles on condition Britain guaranteed to defend France against unprovoked German aggression.

=== Promotion and honours ===
On 31 July 1919, Wilson was promoted to field marshal, after Churchill had offered him a choice of promotion or a peerage. At a dinner for 200 MPs in Wilson's honour, Lloyd George stated that Wilson had earned the promotion for his role in war preparation, for his work in smoothing Anglo-French relations, and for his work in setting up a unified Allied command late in the war. At 55 he was the youngest non-royal field marshal since Wellington (Harold Alexander in 1944 has since been younger). Private A S Bullock, a port official at Le Havre, recalled Wilson, a tall man, arriving at his office with his assistant General Walter Pitt-Taylor and lounging across a doorway because Bullock, unaware of his identity, failed to offer him a seat!

Wilson was also made a baronet. He was appointed a Grand Officier of the Belgian Order of Leopold and awarded the Belgian Croix de guerre, and was given the Chinese Order of Chia-Ho (Golden Grain), 1st Class "Ta-Shou Pao-Kuang", the American Distinguished Service Medal, the Siamese Order of the White Elephant, first class, the Grand Cordon of the Japanese Order of the Rising Sun (later "with flowers of the Paulownia"), the Grand Cross of the Greek Order of the Redeemer, and promoted to Grand Cross of the Légion d'honneur.

Wilson received a grant of £10,000 (his field marshal's pay was £3,600 per annum). Money was still tight – in the summer of 1920 he briefly let out his house at Eaton Place. Over the next few years he received honorary degrees from Oxford, Cambridge, Trinity College Dublin and Queens University Belfast. His estate at his death was £10,678, which included his yacht worth nearly £2,000.

When he took his GCB he had as supporters on his coat of arms a private of the Rifle Brigade and a female figure representing Ulster.

=== Labour unrest and Anglo-Soviet trade talks ===
A wave of labour unrest had begun with the London police strike of August 1918. Wilson had approved the deployment of troops as strike breakers in September 1918 but regretted the concessions granted to striking railwaymen in December 1918. During another railway strike in September 1919, Wilson was concerned he would be left with only 40,000 infantry of whom 12,000 were conscripts, and of which even the "regular" NCOs were young and inexperienced – a police report at the time warned that for the first time in British history the rioters (many of them ex-soldiers) would be better trained than the authorities. Wilson, along with Churchill and Walter Long (First Lord of the Admiralty), wanted military action. Lloyd George, Bonar Law and Hankey did not. Early in 1920 Wilson drew up plans for 18 battalions to protect London, concentrating troops near the sea so they could be moved by the navy rather than by rail.

Wilson privately suspected Lloyd George of being "a traitor & a Bolshevist". He was particularly concerned by the presence in May of a Soviet trade delegation led by Leonid Krasin. This was against the backdrop of the Battle of Warsaw in summer 1920.

By September 1920 a national coal strike seemed imminent, along with possible involvement by railwaymen and transport workers (the "Triple Alliance") and unrest amongst unemployed ex-servicemen, coinciding with rebellion in Iraq and Egypt. Tanks were deployed to Worcester, York, Aldershot and Scotland. By 31 December 1920 Wilson thought that Lloyd George was, for reasons which included his attempt at détente with the Soviets, "totally unfit to govern". The Anglo-Soviet Trade Agreement was eventually signed on 16 March 1921.

Wilson was particularly cross, early in 1921, that with only 10 Guards and 18 Line (8 of them Irish) battalions in the UK to meet another threatened Triple Alliance strike, 4 battalions were being sent from the Rhine to supervise the Upper Silesia plebiscite: he asked Lloyd George if he wanted to be "Prime Minister of England or Silesia". The Cabinet eventually agreed to let Wilson recall battalions from Silesia, Malta and Egypt, mobilise sailors and an 80,000 strong paramilitary "Defence Force". In the event the miners struck without the support of other unions ("Black Friday"), and the sharp slump took the sting out of labour unrest.

=== World commitments ===
Wilson wanted to concentrate troops in Britain, Ireland, India and Egypt – rather than what he saw as excessive commitments to the Rhine and in Iraq, Persia and Palestine. He favoured limited involvement in the Russian Civil War, agreeing with Lloyd George that Churchill's desire to wage active war on Bolshevik Russia was unwise and impractical. Rawlinson was sent out in August 1919 to supervise British withdrawal.

An entire British division had occupied Batumi on the Black Sea supervising German and Turkish withdrawal. Wilson thought the Caucasus "a hornet's [sic] nest" and wrote a paper which Churchill circulated to the Cabinet (3 May 1919) urging retreat from non-vital parts of the world. At the end of August 1919 the British withdrew from Baku on the Caspian. In February 1920 Wilson persuaded the Cabinet to withdraw the remaining 3 battalions from Batumi, but the Foreign Secretary Curzon had the decision reversed on his return from holiday, although to Curzon's fury Wilson gave the local commander George Milne permission to withdraw if necessary. After a British garrison at Enzeli (on the Persian Caspian coast) was taken prisoner by Bolshevik forces on 19 May 1920, Lloyd George finally insisted on abandonment of Batumi early in June 1920. Churchill and Wilson opposed Curzon's aspirations for a permanent British presence in Persia, and financial retrenchment forced a British withdrawal in the spring of 1921.

By February 1920 Wilson's staff wanted to reduce commitment to Iraq, despite inevitable loss of prestige, as occupation of the whole country was not necessary to safeguard the southern Persian oilfields. When revolt broke out in Mesopotamia, Wilson asked (15 July 1920) to pull out of Persia to send reinforcements, but Lloyd George said that Curzon "would not stand it". By October 1920 the local British commander Sir Aylmer Haldane managed to restore order but on 10 December Wilson minuted his agreement to an appraisal by the director of military operations that "we ran things too fine and that a great disaster was only narrowly avoided". Wilson was privately scathing about what he called "Hot Air, Aeroplanes & Arabs" – Trenchard's plan for Air Defence backed by Arab levies, announced by Churchill at the Cairo Conference in July 1921 – although glad at the reduction in military commitment. Wilson and his staff did not agree with Lloyd George's insistence on retaining an occupation force in Turkey and his support for Greek territorial ambitions in Asia Minor (Treaty of Sèvres, 1920).

Wilson was pro-Zionist after a meeting with Chaim Weizmann in May 1919, believing that Jews could police the area for Britain. He wanted to withdraw from the British Mandate of Palestine (which at that time included the Emirate of Transjordan), as Britain did not have the troops to keep both Jews and Arabs under its thumb.

Wilson wanted to retain Egypt as part of the British Empire. After a nationalist rising in the spring of 1919 Milner was appointed to head an inquiry, and in summer 1920 he proposed that Egypt be granted autonomy. Wilson agreed with Churchill, who thought that granting Egypt sovereign independence would set a bad example for India and Ireland. The Allenby Declaration of February 1922 was based on the Milner proposals whilst reserving Britain's "special interest" in the country. Wilson was concerned about the British garrison being restricted to the Suez Canal area and wrote that "the white flag is once more up over 10 Downing Street".

=== Ireland ===
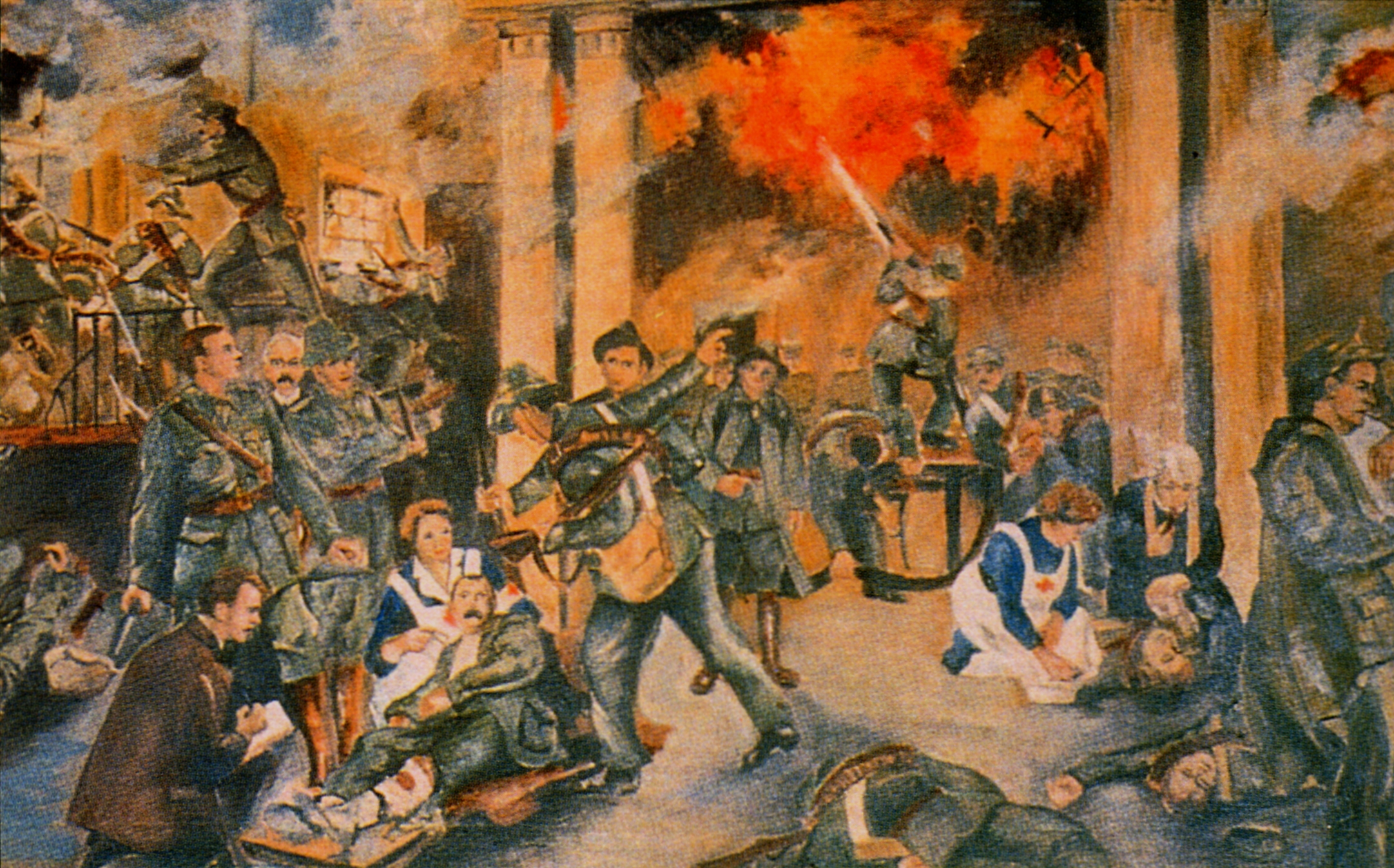
The Birth of the Irish Republic by Walter Paget

In October 1919 Wilson warned Churchill that the planned introduction of Irish Home Rule that autumn would lead to trouble and, given concerns that Robertson lacked the subtlety for the Irish Command which Churchill had offered him, asked him to consult the Prime Minister. Lloyd George preferred Nevil Macready, as he had experience of peacekeeping duties in South Wales and Belfast as well as having served as Commissioner of the Metropolitan Police in London, and he was appointed early in 1920. The Cabinet agreed to Macready's request for vehicles and extra technical personnel, but on Wilson's advice agreed only to hold the 8 requested extra battalions "in readiness". Churchill proposed a force of 8,000 old soldiers be raised to reinforce the RIC, but Wilson thought this force of "scallywags" (the Auxiliary Division as it became, whose numbers peaked at 1,500 in July 1921) would be ill-trained, poorly led and split up into small groups across Ireland, fears which proved justified. Wilson would have preferred a special force of 8 "Garrison Battalions" under full military discipline, and a robust military campaign in Ireland, but this was politically unacceptable. Wilson is sometimes credited with creating the Cairo Gang – there is no evidence for this, and indeed the gang may not even have existed.

Wilson became increasingly concerned that Henry Hugh Tudor, with the connivance of Lloyd George, was operating an unofficial policy of killing IRA men in reprisal for the deaths of pro-Crown forces. Lloyd George refused to formally declare martial law, not least because in July 1920 the Amritsar Massacre (of April 1919) was being debated by Parliament. By late summer 1920 Wilson argued for full Government authorization for reprisals. When speaking with Prime Minister Lloyd George (29 September 1920) Wilson argued: "I pointed out that these reprisals were carried out without anyone being responsible...It was the business of Government to govern. If these men ought to be murdered, then the Government ought to murder them."

With the army stretched very thin by the deployment of two extra divisions to Iraq, and the threatened coal strike in September 1920, Wilson wanted to withdraw ten battalions from Ireland, but Macready warned this would make peacekeeping of Ireland impossible unless the Army was given a free hand to conduct purely military operations. Amidst concerns that police and army discipline would not stay firm indefinitely, Wilson therefore recommended martial law that month, although he also stressed that it needed to have full and open political support. Wilson wanted lists of known Sinn Féiners published on church doors and wanted to "shoot (five IRA men for each policeman killed) by roster seeing that we cannot get evidence".

After the Bloody Sunday assassination of a dozen British officers (21 November 1920) Wilson urged martial law on Churchill "for the hundredth time". After the killing of 17 Auxiliaries in an ambush at Kilmichael, near Macroom, County Cork, martial law was declared (10 December 1920 – Wilson called Churchill and Hamar Greenwood "amazing liars" in his diary for saying they had always been in favour of it) in the four Munster Counties of Cork, Tipperary, Kerry and Limerick – Wilson would have preferred all of Ireland apart from Ulster. On 23 December Irish Home Rule became law. Wilson attended a special conference (29 December) along with Macready, Tudor and John Anderson (Under-Secretary for Ireland) at which they all advised that no truce should be allowed for elections to the planned Parliament of Southern Ireland, and that at least four months (Wilson thought six) months of martial law would be required to restore order – the date for the elections was therefore set for May 1921. In accordance with Wilson and Macready's wishes martial law was extended over the rest of Munster (Counties Waterford and Clare) and part of Leinster (Counties Kilkenny and Wexford).

In February 1921 a new Secretary of State for War, Laming Worthington-Evans, was more willing to listen to Wilson's advice. The Irish War of Independence reached a climax in the first half of 1921, with deaths of pro-Crown forces running at approximately double the rate of those in the second half of 1920. Wilson still urged unity of military and police command, which Macready did not want. In April 1921 the Cabinet decided, against Wilson' advice, to withdraw 4 of Macready's 51 battalions, to meet the possible Triple Alliance strike. Wilson drew up plans to send an extra 30 battalions to suppress Ireland once the strike and the Irish elections were out of the way, not least as troops would otherwise need to be replaced after the strain of guerrilla war. In the event 17 battalions were sent (bringing British strength up to 60,000) in June and July, but the politicians drew back from the brink and began secret talks with James Craig and Éamon de Valera.

Wilson thought the Truce of 11 July 1921 "rank, filthy cowardice" and hoped it would break down, so that an extra 30,000 troops could be sent to crush Sinn Féin, and thought Lloyd George's plan to withdraw from the interior and control major cities and ports ("withdrawal and blockade") "as ridiculous as it was impossible". In June 1921 Lloyd George complained that he could "never get a sane discussion" with Wilson. When Wilson told him that he "did not speak to murderers" and would hand de Valera over to the police on his forthcoming visit to London the Prime Minister replied "Oh nonsense. In public life we must do these things". This appears to have been the final break between Wilson and Lloyd George – despite the urgings of Worthington-Evans Wilson did not meet the Prime Minister again until 10 February 1922. Wilson thought the Anglo-Irish Treaty a "shameful & cowardly surrender to the pistol" by a "Cabinet of Cowards" and, correctly predicting civil war in Ireland, was keen to get out before "one set of murderers" (the Irish government) asked for British military aid against "another set of murderers".

On 3 August 1921 Wilson, who had been elected a member of the Royal Yacht Squadron the previous year, almost drowned in a yachting accident.

Wilson's last act as CIGS (January 1922) was to argue against Geddes' recommendation of further army cuts of 50,000 men and £20m off the £75m estimates. The proposed cuts were scaled back after a review by Churchill, former War Secretary.

== Member of Parliament and Ulster adviser ==
Wilson was offered a seat in the devolved Northern Ireland parliament and a probable ministerial post at Stormont. There was also talk of an English seat, but he agreed to stand (for Westminster) for North Down, provided it was only for one parliament, that he was unopposed and that it only cost him £100-£200. He was also advised that a parliamentary seat would make it easier to pick up company directorships.

He resigned from the army, being replaced as CIGS by Rudolph Lambart, 10th Earl of Cavan on 19 February 1922, and was elected as a Ulster Unionist on 21 February 1922. Although the Conservatives were still officially supporting the Lloyd George Coalition, Wilson wrote that all his energies would be devoted to overthrowing the present government. He spoke seven times as an MP, twice on the army estimates and five times on Ireland.

Sir James Craig invited Wilson to advise the Northern Ireland government on security. At a conference on St Patrick's Day 1922 Wilson advised an increase in the Special Constabulary, but urged that loyal Catholics be encouraged to join, rather than keeping it a purely Protestant body (Craig did not pass on this recommendation to the Stormont Cabinet). He also advised that an able army officer be appointed to take command of the Royal Ulster Constabulary (RUC), to avoid a poorly run force alienating public opinion as the Black and Tans had done. Wilson was unimpressed by Craig (whom he thought "very second rate … self-satisfied, lazy & bad judge of men & events") and other members of the Northern Ireland administration. However, in the first half of 1922 an undeclared war was under way in Northern Ireland and in Nationalist eyes Wilson was blamed for the RUC's stance in the sectarian violence, Michael Collins calling him "a violent Orange partisan".

Anthony Heathcote writes that Wilson proposed a re-organisation of the police and military forces in Northern Ireland into an army to reconquer the south.

== Assassination ==
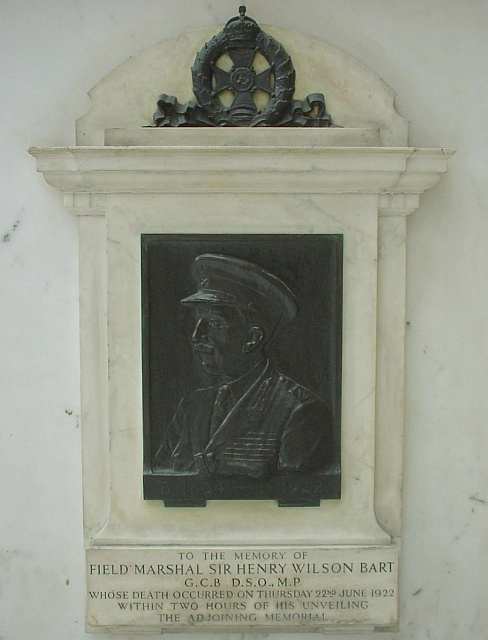
Memorial to Wilson at Liverpool Street station, adjacent to a war memorial which he unveiled just over an hour before his death.

On 22 June 1922, two London-based members of the Irish Republican Army, Reginald Dunne and Joseph O'Sullivan, assassinated Wilson outside his house at 36 Eaton Place at approximately 2:20 pm. He was in full uniform as he was returning from unveiling the Great Eastern Railway War Memorial at Liverpool Street station at 1:00 pm. He had six wounds, two of them fatal, to the chest.

Stories later circulated that the first shot missed. Rather than taking shelter in the house, Wilson drew his sword and advanced on his attackers, who were able to shoot and kill him. These stories often stressed that he had died a martyr. His housemaid testified that she found his drawn sword lying by his side.

These details are not in the three witness accounts quoted by Keith Jeffery (Reginald Dunne's account smuggled out of prison, or the inquest testimonies of one of two road menders working nearby and of the taxi driver who had just dropped Wilson off). One of the road menders' accounts, as published in the Daily Mail, mentions Wilson turning on his attackers with the words "you cowardly swine!" but Jeffery suggests this was an embellishment by the newspaper.

Two police officers and a chauffeur were also shot as the men attempted to avoid capture. They were then surrounded by a crowd and arrested by other policemen after a struggle. Dunne and O'Sullivan (who while serving as a British soldier had lost a leg in World War I) were captured by an angry crowd. Dunne (also a combat veteran of the British Army) had returned to try to help O'Sullivan. He was also captured after shooting and wounding two police officers and a passerby. Convicted of murder, both men were hanged on 10 August 1922.

Wilson had regarded himself as Irish and to the end of his life Currygrane, County Longford was the first address in his "Who's Who" entry. In early July 1919 Wilson, in uniform and in an open car, had still been able to drive his mother there, the last time he ever visited the place. During the War of Independence, the IRA had taken the family guns and the house had been taken over by Auxiliaries. By 1921, he and his brothers had all had to leave, unable to access papers and valuables, his brother Jemmy living in impecunious circumstances at Rye in Sussex (Wilson had to pay for the schooling of Jemmy's daughter) and it was unsafe for Wilson even to book a ferry crossing to Dublin under his own name. On the day Wilson's killers were hanged, Currygrane was burned to the ground, possibly as a reprisal although possibly as an unrelated part of the unrest in that county. Referring to Wilson in his statement before execution, Dunne said: "He was at the time of his death the Military Advisor to what is colloquially called the Ulster Government, and as Military Advisor he raised and organized a body of men known as the Ulster Special Constabulary, who are the principal agents in his reign of terror."

=== Alleged Michael Collins involvement ===
T. Ryle Dwyer suggests that the shooting of Wilson was ordered by Irish Free State General and Commander-in-Chief Michael Collins in retaliation for the continuing troubles in Northern Ireland. He returned to Dublin before the incident and jubilantly announced the news to the appalled defence minister, Richard Mulcahy, who threatened to resign. By 1923 Scotland Yard investigations centred around the involvement of Sam Maguire, Collins's chief intelligence officer in London. Maguire was tipped off and fled to Dublin.

According to an associate of Collins, Joseph Sweeney, after the shooting of Wilson he saw Collins looking "very pleased" and asked "where do we stand on the shooting?" Collins replied "It was two of ours that did it". He then told Sweeney that he had told Tom Cullen, a colleague of Collins, to plan a rescue attempt but that such an attempt was impossible.

However, this claim has been challenged by Peter Hart. According to Hart any order to assassinate Wilson would have had to have been relayed to them by Rory O'Connor (then in charge of British IRA operations) and the last assassination attempt contrived against Wilson had been set to be executed in 1921, not 1922. Tim Pat Coogan has suggested that Reginald Dunne, who had the confidence of both Michael Collins and Rory O'Connor, undertook the shooting as a last-ditch effort to provoke the British Government into retaliating, thereby uniting both sides of the Nationalists. The killers had only decided to attack the previous evening, and even on the day Sullivan had been at work until 1pm; the killers had no getaway plan.

=== Government reaction ===
The guns used by the assassins were sent to David Lloyd George and Winston Churchill in the Cabinet Room at 10 Downing Street; "There was no Henry Wilson. The Prime Minister and I faced each other, and on the table between us lay the pistols which an hour before had taken this loyal man's life". The House of Commons was immediately adjourned as a mark of respect and King George V sent his equerry, Colonel Arthur Erskine, to Eaton Place to convey the royal sympathy to Lady Wilson. A dinner to celebrate the Prince of Wales's birthday, arranged at Buckingham Palace for the evening, was also cancelled.

Cabinet Ministers held a conference at 10 Downing Street on 5pm on the day of the assassination. They suspected Anti-Treaty forces (who had recently seized the Four Courts in Dublin) might be responsible – this was in fact not the case – and thought the Irish Provisional Government "should be pressed to deal with the matter". Macready was summoned to London, where he found the Cabinet worried about their personal safety but also keen for a dramatic gesture of retaliation, and was asked whether it was possible for British troops to seize the Four Courts – he said that it was but cautioned against precipitate action which might reunite the two Irish factions, and on his return to Dublin deliberately delayed taking such action. Nonetheless, suspicion of Anti-Treaty complicity in Wilson's murder, and perceived British pressure to do something about it, was one of several triggers of the Irish Civil War.

The assassination was greeted with horror in the UK, and compared to the Phoenix Park killings of 1882, which had – it was said – set back the cause of Irish Home Rule by a generation. It was the first assassination of an MP since Prime Minister Spencer Perceval in 1812 and the last until Airey Neave's assassination by the INLA in 1979.

=== Funeral ===
Wilson's widow blamed the government for his death – when Conservative leader Austen Chamberlain called on the evening of his death to offer his condolences, he was by one account greeted by her with the word "murderer" and by another simply asked to leave by Wilson's niece – and she was only persuaded to allow government representation at the funeral on the grounds that not to do so would be disrespectful to the King. Wilson's mother wrote to Bonar Law (former Conservative leader and increasingly seen as an alternative if the Coalition ended) complaining that, in a noisy Commons debate, Lloyd George had claimed to have been a personal friend of Wilson's.

Wilson's funeral was a public affair attended by Lloyd George and the cabinet, Foch, Nivelle and Weygand from France as well as many of his former army colleagues including French, Macready, Haig and Robertson. The field marshal was buried in the crypt of St Paul's Cathedral.

== Assessments ==
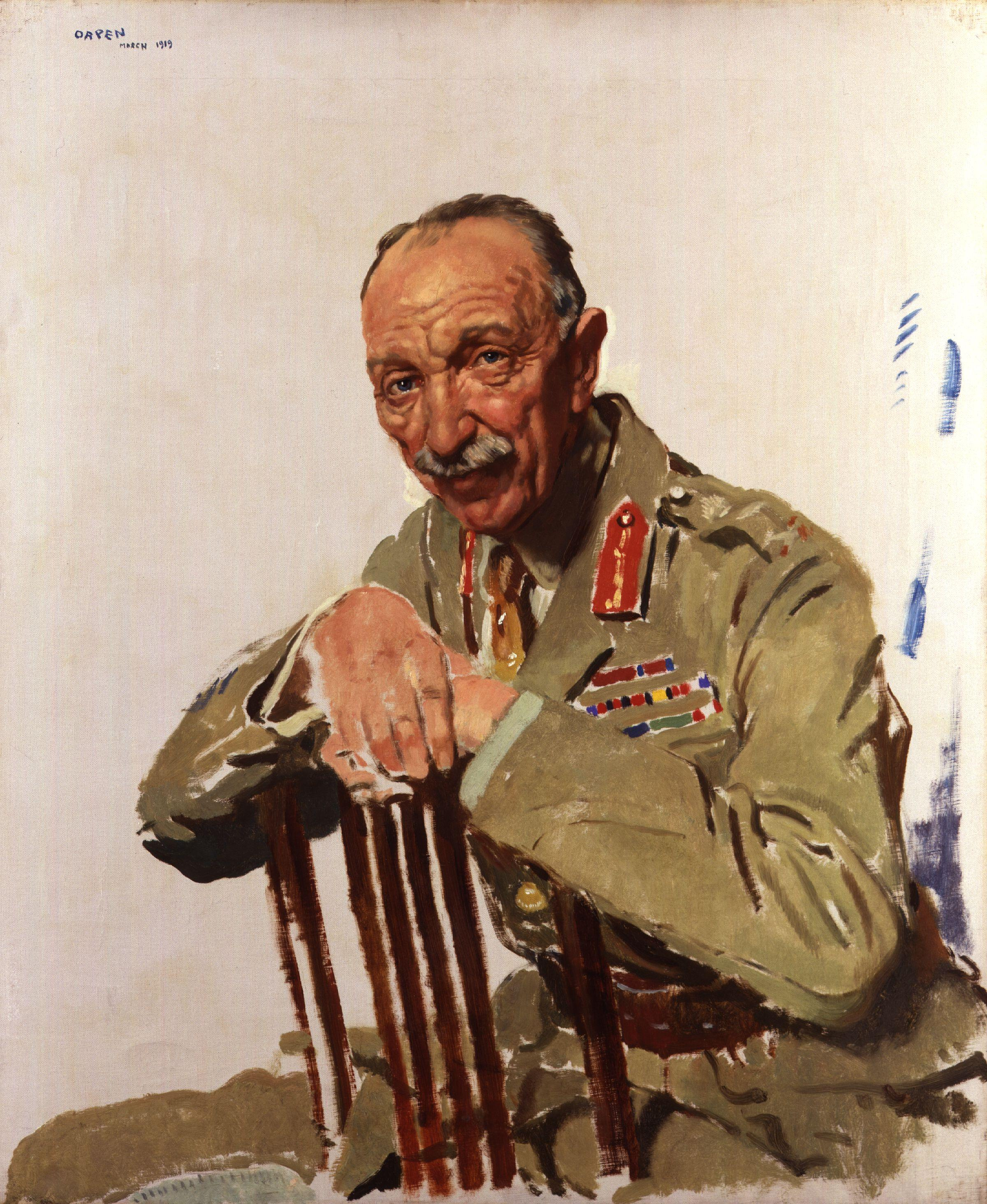
Portrait of Wilson by Sir William Orpen

=== Personality ===
Wilson was widely regarded by his contemporaries as a charming man, describing him as a "delightful whirlwind" and writing that "there was something spectacular and theatrical about him". Many politicians enjoyed his levity – Kiggell said he was the only general who could talk to the "Frocks" on level terms – as did the French, who called him Général Double-Vé ("General W"). Some senior British officers believed that his sympathy for the French amounted almost to treason.

Wilson's popularity was not universal, however: Sir Sam Fay, a railway official who worked at the War Office 1917–19, enjoyed cordial face-to-face relations with Wilson but wrote that he could argue with total conviction that a horse chestnut was the same thing as a chestnut horse, and that an unnamed senior general said he suffered a "sexual disturbance" whenever he came within a mile of a politician (Fay recorded that the general had in fact used "vulgar and obscene" language – Walter Reid simply writes that exposure to politicians gave Wilson an erection). Edward Spears – also a senior Anglo-French liaison officer, but junior to Wilson – compared him to Quint, the sinister valet in Henry James's The Turn of the Screw.

For much of the war Wilson had a poor relationship with Haig, although relations eased somewhat when Wilson became CIGS. Esher said that he was always loyal to the man he was serving, and Walter Reid believes Wilson did not actively plot against Haig. When French asked Wilson, late in 1915, if he had heard of Haig, Rawlinson and Gough intriguing against him, Wilson replied, perhaps somewhat naively, that "Haig was too good a fellow" for that kind of thing. After the disaster of 1 July 1916 Wilson wrote (5 July) that Haig was "a good stout hearted defensive soldier with no imagination & very little brains & very little sympathy". That same day Foch, who had declined an invitation from Haig to lunch with Wilson, thought Haig "was stupid & lacked stomach for the fight" which Wilson thought "not quite fair".

Haig's private views of Wilson were less cordial: he thought him "a politician, and not a soldier". After a meeting on 23 June 1916, following the failed counterattack at Vimy Ridge, Haig wrote that Wilson "seems to acquire a more evil look each time I see him".

=== Obituaries ===
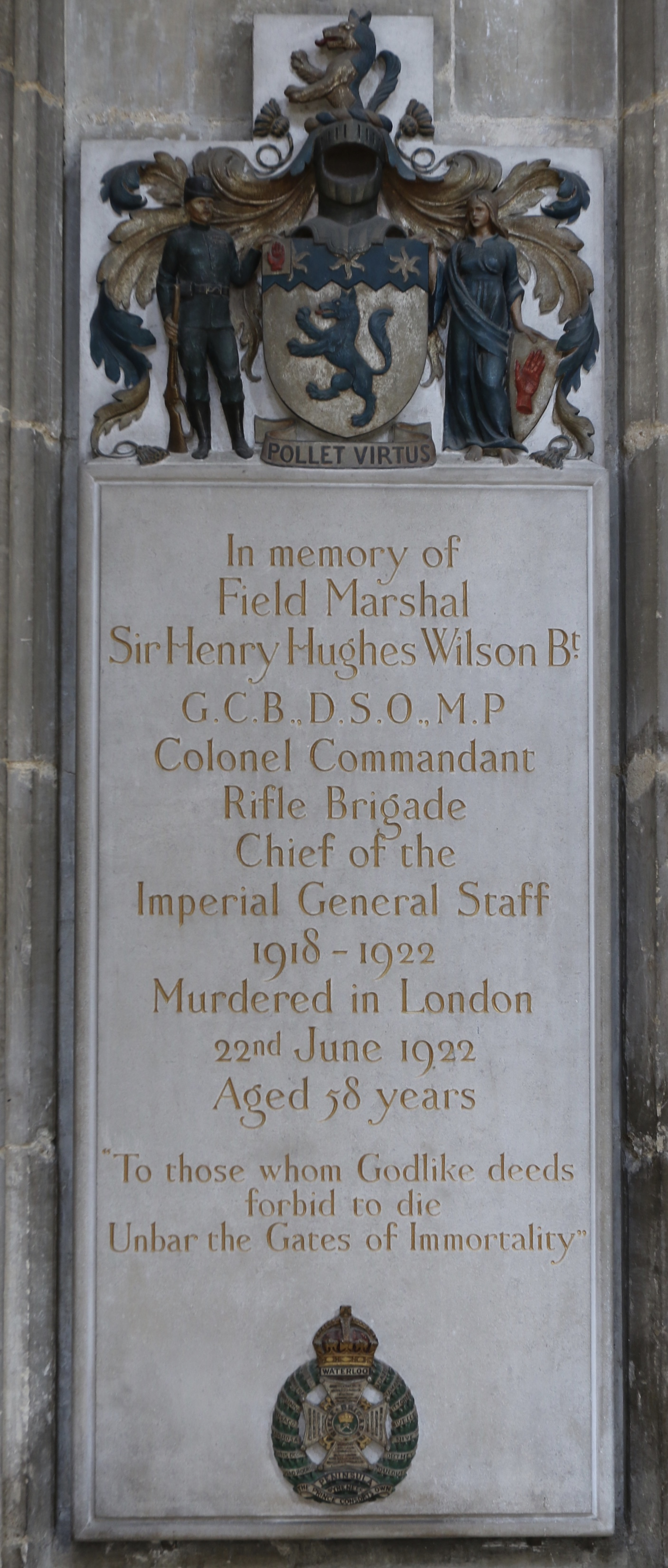
Memorial in Winchester Cathedral

On the day of his funeral General "Tim" Harington held a memorial service for him at Constantinople, declaring "he died for Ireland ... It may be that this sacrifice may save Ireland". Carson sent a message to the Ulster Unionist Council praising him as "Ireland's greatest son … He died for Ulster's liberty". The Times praised Wilson as "a warrior Irishman". The Morning Post, a paper which strongly supported the abandoned southern Unionists, pointed out that "a great Irishman" had been murdered on the anniversary of King George V's Belfast speech which had marked, as they saw it, the British "surrender". However the Liberal The Daily News argued that Wilson must bear some responsibility for stirring up bloodshed in Belfast of which his death was part and the "New Statesman" claimed that in his "fanatical Orangeism" and devotion to "force and force alone" he was the British counterpart to Cathal Brugha. Lord Milner, Irish nationalist MP T. P. O'Connor and the military correspondent Repington wrote obituaries which were generous about his warm personality, and in Repington's case about his role in war preparations.

=== Immediate assessments ===
Callwell's two volume Life and Diaries in 1927 damaged Wilson's reputation – the New Statesman thought they showed him to be "the typically stupid militarist…fundamentally a fool." Sir Charles Deedes, who had studied under him at Staff College and later served on his staff, commented that Wilson came across in the diaries as "an ambitious, volatile and even fatuous character, an intriguer concerned mainly with his own career" and that this was "far from the truth" – Deedes commented that Wilson's ability to see both sides of a question and inability to make a decision and stick to it made him a poor corps commander but a "patient, lucid and fair" adviser. Lloyd George's view in his own War Memoirs was essentially similar, although he wrote that Wilson was reluctant to take responsibility for decisions.

Both Archibald Wavell in the 1930s and Sir John Dill as CIGS in 1941 (who commented that he no longer condemned Wilson "so heartily as one used to") commented that Wilson had illustrated that a general must be able to work effectively with politicians, and his modern biographer Keith Jeffery comments that this, rather than Robertson's acrimonious insistence on military autonomy, has been the model since Wilson's time.

=== Policies ===
Jeffery comments that for all Wilson's reputation for intrigue he was mainly an inveterate gossip (a feature which endeared him to some politicians), whose closeness to the French alienated Robertson, and whose behaviour was no worse than the intrigues of Robertson, Haig, Rawlinson and Gough to remove Sir John French. His reputation for political intrigue was acquired for his involvement in the arguments over conscription and Ireland in 1912–14. Esher (in his life of Kitchener) later blamed Wilson's "Irish blood, exuberant with combative malice" for having drawn him into the latter quarrel, which had earned him the reputation of "a pestilential fellow".

Sir Charles Deedes later (in September 1968) wrote that Wilson's energy and foresight in 1910–14 had ensured that Britain would take her place alongside France when war came. An alternative view, aired as early as the 1920s, is that Wilson locked Britain into a continental commitment which Kitchener would rather have avoided or minimised. Jeffery is critical of some historians – e.g. Zara Steiner in Britain and the Origins of the First World War, Gerhard Ritter in The Sword and the Sceptre – who take an oversimplified view of Wilson as a supporter of the French position. Although Wilson's verbal fluency and charm brought him great influence, his position was also supported by most of his military colleagues and by the most influential members of the Cabinet. Furthermore, this ignores Wilson's interest in reaching a military agreement with Belgium.

=== Modern biographies and popular culture ===
The Lost Dictator by Bernard Ash (1968) argued that had he lived Wilson might have become leader of the Tory Diehards and become a dictatorial ruler. Jeffrey argued this was implausible, as the Diehards were never more than about 50 in number and Wilson lacked the political skills or even the understated personality needed by Conservative leaders of that era.

Wilson (Michael Redgrave) features in the satirical film Oh! What a Lovely War (1969), travelling in a car in August 1914 with a cretinous Sir John French (Laurence Olivier) who rejects his offer to arrange an interpreter as it might breach the need for "absolute secrecy", but later being passed over in favour of Robertson for a staff promotion.

For many years a portrait of Wilson by Sir Oswald Birley hung in the "Prime Minister's room" at Parliament Buildings, Stormont, along with a framed set of his medal ribbons left by his widow to Sir James Craig. A number of Orange lodges were named after him, although he had never joined the Orange Order.

== Arms ==
Coat of arms of Wilson of Currygrane
Notes as recorded at Ulster Office Crest A demi-wolf rampant per pale indented argent and azure. Escutcheon Argent, a wolf rampant Azure, on a chief indented of the Last, three estoiles of the Field. Supporters Dexter: A Private in the Rifle Brigade holding in the exterior hand a rifle all Proper; sinister: A female figure representing Ulster vested Azure, resting the exterior hand on a shield Argent, charged with a sinister hand couped gules. Motto Virtue avails

== See also ==
- List of United Kingdom MPs with the shortest service

== Bibliography ==
- Amery, Leopold (1953). My Political Life, "War and Peace, 1914-1929". Vol. 2. Hutchinson.
- Callwell, Major-General Sir Charles Edward (1927). Field Marshal Sir Henry Wilson: His Life and Diaries. Vol. 1. Cassell.
- Callwell, Major-General Sir Charles Edward (1927). Field Marshal Sir Henry Wilson: His Life and Diaries. Vol. 2. Cassell.
- Churchill, Winston (2007). The World Crisis 1911–1918. Penguin Books. ISBN 978-0-14-144205-1.
- Clark, Christopher M. (2012). The Sleepwalkers: How Europe Went to War in 1914. London: Allen Lane. ISBN 978-0-7139-9942-6. LCCN 2012515665.
- Collier, Basil (1961). Brasshat: A biography of Field Marshal Sir Henry Wilson. Secker and Warburg.
- Coogan, Tim Pat (2003). The Irish Civil War. Weidenfeld and Nicolson. ISBN 0-297-82454-6.
- Coogan, Tim Pat (1991). Michael Collins. Cornerstone. ISBN 978-1784753269.
- Crosby, Travis L. (2014). The Unknown Lloyd George, A Statesman in Conflict. I B Tauris, London. ISBN 978-1-780-76485-6.
- De Groot, Gerard (1988). Douglas Haig 1861–1928. Unwin Hyman. ISBN 978-0-04-440192-6.
- Dwyer, T. Ryle (2005). The Squad. The Mercier Press Ltd. ISBN 978-1-85635-469-1.
- Farrar-Hockley, General Sir Anthony (1975). Goughie. London: Granada. ISBN 0-246-64059-6.
- Harris, J. P. (2008). Douglas Haig and the First World War. Cambridge: Cambridge University Press. ISBN 978-0-521-89802-7.
- Hart, Peter (2003). The IRA at War 1916 – 1923. Oxford University Press. ISBN 978-0-19-925258-9.
- Hart, Peter (2008). 1918: A Very British Victory. Phoenix Books, London. ISBN 978-0-7538-2689-8.
- Hastings, Max (2013). Catastrophe 1914: Europe Goes To War. New York: Alfred A. Knopf. ISBN 978-0-307-59705-2.
- Heathcote, Tony (1999). The British Field Marshals 1736–1997. Pen & Sword Books Ltd. ISBN 0-85052-696-5.
- Holmes, Richard (2004). The Little Field Marshal: A Life of Sir John French. Weidenfeld & Nicolson. ISBN 0-297-84614-0.
- Jeffery, Keith (1985). The Military Correspondence of Field Marshal Sir Henry Wilson, 1918–1922. The Bodley Head. ISBN 978-0-37-030683-4.
- Jeffery, Keith (2006). Field Marshal Sir Henry Wilson: A Political Soldier. Oxford University Press. ISBN 978-0-19-820358-2.
- Kitchen, Martin (2001). The German Offensives of 1918. Tempus, Stroud. ISBN 0-7524-1799-1.
- Mackay, James A. (1996). Michael Collins: A Life. Mainstream Publishing. ISBN 978-1-85158-857-2.
- Mead, Gary (2008). The Good Soldier. The Biography of Douglas Haig. Atlantic Books, London. ISBN 978-1-84354-281-0.
- Millman, Brock (December 1995). "Henry Wilson's mischief: Field marshall Sir Henry Wilson's Rise to Power 1917–18". Canadian Journal of History. 30 (3): 467–486. doi:10.3138/cjh.30.3.467.
- Neillands, Robin (2006). The Death of Glory: the Western Front 1915. John Murray. ISBN 978-0-7195-6245-7.
- Reid, Walter (2006). Architect of Victory: Douglas Haig. Birlinn Ltd, Edinburgh. ISBN 1-84158-517-3.
- Robbins, Simon (2005). British Generalship on the Western Front. Abingdon: Routledge. ISBN 0-415-40778-8.
- Sheffield, Gary; Todman, Dan (2004). Command and Control on the Western Front. Stroud: Spellmount. ISBN 978-1-86227-420-4.
- Sheffield, Gary (2011). The Chief. Aurum, London. ISBN 978-1-84513-691-8.
- Spencer, John (2020). Wilson's War: Sir Henry Wilson's Influence on British Military Policy in the Great War and its aftermath. Helion and Company, Solihull. ISBN 978-1-91286-627-4.
- Terraine, John (1960). Mons, The Retreat to Victory. Wordsworth Military Library, London. ISBN 1-84022-240-9.
- The Times (of London) (Digital Archive)
- Travers, Tim (2005). How the War Was Won. Pen and Sword, London. ISBN 978-1-84415-207-0.
- Tuchman, Barbara (1962). August 1914. Constable & Co. ISBN 978-0-333-30516-4.
- Woodward, David R (1998). Field Marshal Sir William Robertson. Praeger, Westport Connecticut & London. ISBN 0-275-95422-6.

Military offices
Preceded by Henry Rawlinson	Commandant of the Staff College, Camberley; 1907–1910	Succeeded by William Robertson
Preceded by Spencer Ewart	Director of Military Operations; August 1910 – August 1914	Succeeded by Charles Callwell
Preceded by Sir James Wolfe Murray	GOC-in-C Eastern Command; 1917–1918	Succeeded by Sir William Robertson
Preceded by Sir William Robertson	Chief of the Imperial General Staff; 1918–1922	Succeeded by The Earl of Cavan
Parliament of the United Kingdom
Preceded by Thomas Watters Brown	Member of Parliament for North Down; February 1922–June 1922	Succeeded by John Simms
Baronetage of the United Kingdom
New creation	Baronet (of Currygrane); 1919–1922	Extinct
