= Storrs (surname) =

Storrs is a surname. Notable people with the surname include:

- Cornelia Storrs Adair (1884–1962), American educator
- Margaret Storrs Grierson (1900–1997), American academic and archivist
- J. Storrs Hall, scientist in the field of molecular nanotechnology
- Cherilla Storrs Lowrey (1861–1918), American educator and clubwoman
- Elizabeth Storrs Mead (1832–1917), American educator
- Antony Storrs (1907–2002), Canadian Navy officer
- Charles and Augustus Storrs, American brothers who co-founded the University of Connecticut
- Charles Backus Storrs (1794–1833), first President of Western Reserve College and Preparatory School
- Christopher Storrs (1889–1977), Anglican bishop of Grafton
- Francis Storrs (1883–1918), British academic and intelligence agent
- George Storrs (1796–1879), American preacher, Christian writer, and editor
- George Harry Storrs (1860–1909), British murder victim
- Henry R. Storrs (1787–1837), U.S. Representative from New York
- John Storrs (architect) (1920–2003), American architect
- John Storrs (priest) (1846–1928), Anglican priest, Dean of Rochester
- John Storrs (sculptor) (1885–1956), American modernist sculptor
- Lucius Seymour Storrs (1869–1945), American geologist and railway official
- Monica Storrs (1888–1967), British-born Canadian pioneer and Anglican missionary
- Nancy Storrs (1950–2023), American rower
- Richard Salter Storrs (1821–1900), American Congregational clergyman
- Ronald Storrs (1881–1955), British Imperial administrator
- Royal O. Storrs (1815–1888), American businessman
- Seth Storrs (1756–1837), American politician
- Suzanne Storrs (1934–1995), American actor
- William L. Storrs (1795–1861), American judge
- Zalmon Storrs (1779–1867), American judge and politician

== See also ==
- Storrs (disambiguation)
