= Supreme War Council =

Central command of the Allied forces of WWI, based in Versailles, France (1917-20)

The Supreme War Council was a central command based in Versailles that coordinated the military strategy of the principal Allies of World War I: Britain, France, Italy, the United States, and Japan. It was founded in 1917 after the Russian Revolution and with Russia's withdrawal as an ally imminent. The council served as a second source of advice for civilian leadership, a forum for preliminary discussions of potential armistice terms, later for peace treaty settlement conditions, and it was succeeded by the Conference of Ambassadors in 1920.

== Formation ==
British Prime Minister David Lloyd George had grave concerns regarding the strategy of Sir William Robertson, Chief of the Imperial General Staff, and Sir Douglas Haig, the Commander in Chief of the British Expeditionary Force, in response to the Allied losses at the Somme and Passchendaele.

Also, following the Italian defeat at the Battle of Caporetto, in which the Germans and Austro-Hungarians surprised the Royal Italian Army, Lloyd George proposed the formation of a Supreme War Council at the Rapallo Conference of 5–7 November 1917.

Japan and Russia were not to be included, and the Italians and French, worried that Salonika (and with it the only chance of liberating Serbia) might be evacuated, wanted issues confined to the Western Front.

=== Permanent Military Representatives ===
Each Allied nation would be represented by their head of government, and an appointed senior military officer known as the Permanent Military Representative (PMR). The French PMR was Ferdinand Foch, later replaced by Maxime Weygand and Joseph Joffre. The British were represented by Sir Henry Wilson until 1918, then Charles Sackville-West. Italy was represented by Luigi Cadorna.

The United States, which was "an Associated Power" of the Allies, was not involved with the political structure, but sent a Permanent Military Representative, General Tasker H. Bliss.

General Wilson and his staff conducted numerous research projects into offensives against Turkey, culminating in "Joint Note# 12".

== Meetings ==
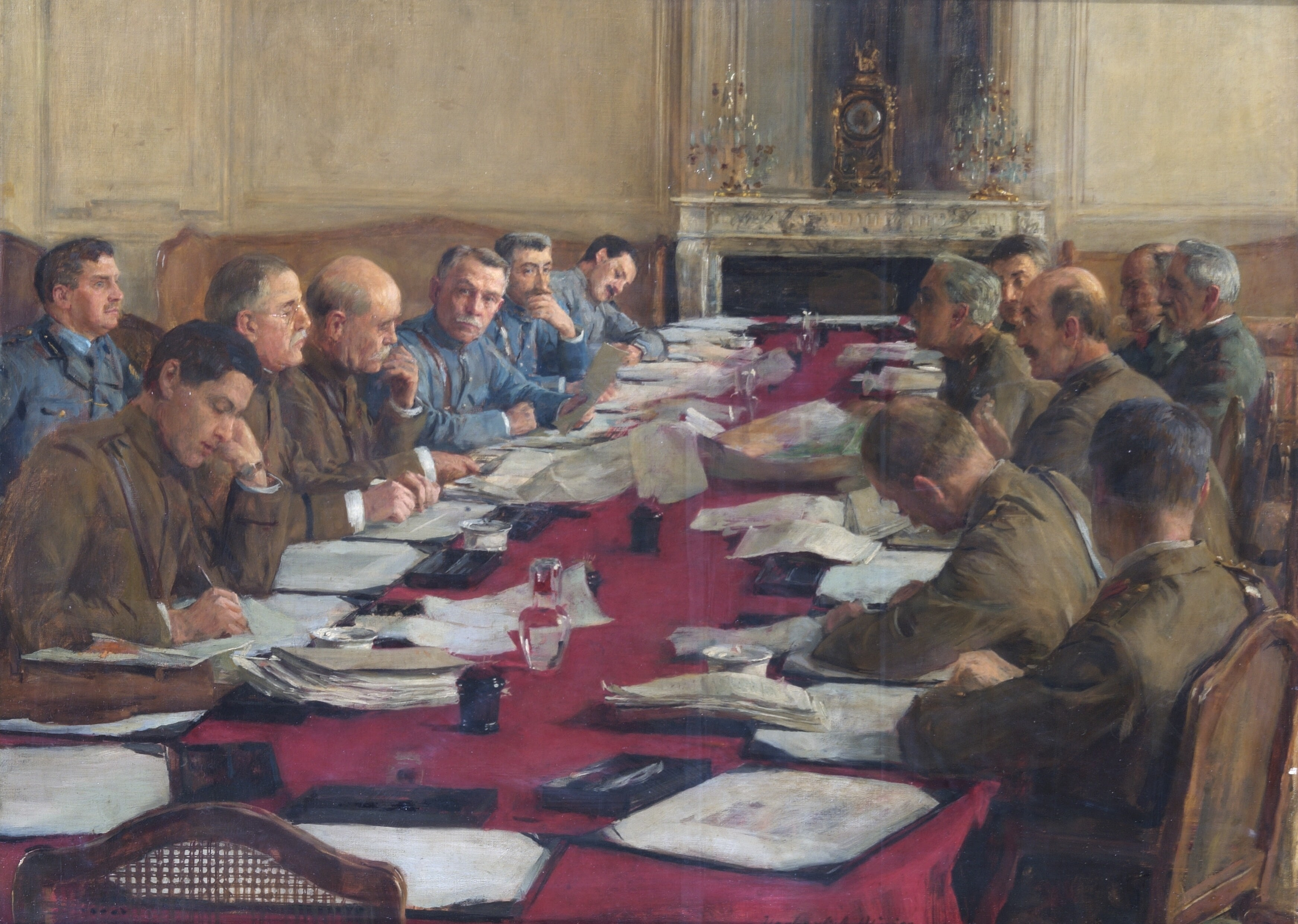
The Four Military Representatives of the Supreme War Council, Versailles, their CO's, Secretaries, and Interpreters in session.

Although the military council sat about once a week (90 meetings took place between November 1917 and November 1919), formal Interallied Conferences with Prime Ministers in attendance took place ten times during the lifespan of the Supreme War Council (SWC). Those meetings are listed below.

=== Wartime meetings ===
==== 5-7 November 1917 ====
At the Rapallo Conference in the town of Rapallo, Italy (close to the French border), the formation of the Supreme War Council was approved by the Allied war leaders. The idea was thought up by the British, accepted by the French, and approved at a British War Cabinet meeting on 2 November 1917. It was also decided that its headquarters would be in Versailles.

==== 29 Nov to 3 Dec 1917 ====
The first Interallied Conference in France took place in Paris at the Quai d'Orsay and at The Trianon Palace Hotel conference room in Versailles. This was the first appearance of Prime Minister Georges Clemenceau, who took office on 14 November 1917. The four heads of state represented were Clemenceau, David Lloyd George, Vittorio Orlando, and Colonel Edward House (for President Woodrow Wilson). Supporting the four were their permanent military representatives: General Maxime Weygand (France), General Sir Henry Wilson (UK), General Luigi Cadorna (Italy) and General Tasker Bliss (US). The conference ended with the drafting of eight resolutions, the most important of which was to find ways to defend the allied line.

==== 29 Jan to 2 Feb 1918 ====
The third SWC Interallied Conference was held at Versailles, just outside Paris. The Council agreed to a defensive plan on the Western Front for 1918 (because the Germans were being reinforced by troops from the now defunct Eastern Front, whilst US troops would not be deployed in strength until later in the year), with an offensive operation against Turkey.

Maurice Hankey recorded of this meeting that the national Commanders-in-Chief, national Chiefs of Staff and PMRs "all gave different advice" creating "a worse state of chaos than I have ever known in all my wide experience". Lloyd George, whose main goal was to thwart Robertson and possibly prompted by the notes Henry Wilson (a rival of Robertson) was passing him across the table, blocked a suggestion by Ferdinand Foch (French Chief of Staff) that the proposed Allied General Reserve be controlled by the national Chiefs of Staff. It was eventually agreed that Foch should command the Reserve, with Wilson as his deputy. The General Reserve was to consist of 13 French, 10 British, and 7 Italian divisions. To streamline decision making, an Executive War Board was established, headed by General Foch, to command the General Reserve.

Between the third and fourth SWC meetings, resistance to the General Reserve by General Robertson caused him to be replaced by Wilson. In early March, it was found that B.E.F. Commander Douglas Haig also refused to follow the SWC order. Allied with General Philippe Pétain and Prime Minister Clemenceau, both of whom opposed the measure, the advocates of a General Reserve were thwarted. With a massive attack from Germany thought to be imminent, Lloyd George decided that it was too late to replace Haig and follow through with the plan. In addition to the establishment of a General Reserve, Prime Minister Clemenceau made an attempt at establishing unity of command. However, Prime Minister Lloyd George refused, citing "home politics" and problems with Parliament and the public. Lloyd George repeated his stand when talking to Field Marshal Haig at GHQ.

==== 13–15 March 1918 ====
The fourth SWC Interallied Conference was held in London. Here, the General Reserve plan was cancelled. It was thought it would take three months to reposition divisions for the Reserve, when, in fact, the German attack was just 8 days away. This caused a great debate between General Ferdinand Foch and Prime Minister Clemenceau, and Prime Minister Lloyd George considered replacing Field Marshal Haig. In the absence of a General Reserve, the allies had to rely on a verbal mutual support agreement between Field Marshal Haig and General Pétain. The council also put out an official statement about the Brest-Litovsk "peace" treaty made between Germany and Russia. Prime Minister Clemenceau made another attempt at establishing unity of command but was rebuffed by Lloyd George, who said Foch's appointment to the Executive War Board had been a "great concession". General Henri Mordacq, Clemenceau's aide, said Britain only turned for unity of command at the last minute when her armies were about to be thrown into the sea.

The Allied Reserve eventually slipped from the agenda as the Commanders-in-Chief, Haig and Pétain, refused to hand over sufficient troops. In February 1918, Wilson had replaced Robertson as CIGS and on 26 March Ferdinand Foch became Allied Generalissimo. After April 1918 all Allied troops on the Western Front were placed under the command of the Grand Quartier général des armées alliées (GQGA), a multi-national general staff. The GQGA was on similar lines to the GQG (French Army Headquarters). Without its two main personalities, Foch and Wilson, the military machinery at Versailles became less important.

==== 1–2 May 1918 ====
The fifth SWC Conference was held in Versailles and Abbeville, France, in the aftermath of the German Operation Michael (21 March) and Operation Georgette (7 April) offensives. The urgent need to transfer American troops to the Western Front, faster than originally planned, was discussed. A separate agreement made in late January between the United States and Britain provided that America would supply six complete divisions to France, transported in British ships, and trained by the British Army. Due to the need for battlefield replacements, the SWC military generals issued Joint Note #18, which asked that the United States only send infantry and machine gun units to France. General Pershing agreed to the arrangement, but wanted to take it one month at a time. Prime Minister Clemenceau drafted the final agreement, which extended the plan for two months.

At the prefect's (police chief's ?) house in Abbeville, at 10 am on 2 May, a secret meeting took place to discuss the matter of a B.E.F. embarkment from the Channel Ports. In a time of crisis, if the Germans pushed the English toward the Channel Ports, should the B.E.F. retreat to England or move south and link up with the French? It was known that both Field Marshal Haig, and General Robertson's replacement, General Henry Wilson, both favored embarkation. This matter was discussed by the military generals before the official conference started. General Foch, who was present, would have none of it. When asked, he repeatedly answered, "Ne lachez pas pied" (Don't let go), and "Ni l'un ni l'autre. Cramponnez partout" (Neither. Cling Everywhere). At the start of the war, instructions from Field Marshal Lord Kitchener to Field Marshal Sir John French (B.E.F. Commander at the time) authorized him, in the event of "unusual circumstances", to retreat to the Channel Ports, but not to evacuate. "The view taken at Abbeville was that the British should retire behind the Somme and abandon the Channel ports rather than lose touch with the French." Henry Wilson says this was unanimously agreed to. Because of this, instructions were reinforced on 21 June 1918 to order Field Marshal Haig to retreat south and link up with the French. Remarkably, twenty two years later, Lord Gort faced the same exact predicament when the Germans invaded France and the armored spearheads of the Wehrmacht advanced rapidly toward the Channel Ports. In defiance of orders, Gort asked for an evacuation, and he ordered the B.E.F. to retreat to the Channel Ports, where a hastily arranged embarkation took place. Although the Miracle of Dunkirk may have saved the British Army, Lord Gort was sidelined for the rest of his career.

==== 1–3 June 1918 ====
The sixth SWC Conference took place in Versailles against the background of the German Bluecher Offensive which had begun on 27 May. Here, the United States was asked for more reinforcements. Other issues discussed were amalgamation (the integration of US troops with the B.E.F.), and the pooling of allied supplies.

Allied pessimism prevailed at this meeting. French divisions were down to 50% strength, and the British were not faring much better. The British, French and Italian Prime Ministers signed a letter to President Wilson that said, "there is a great danger of the war being lost ... owing to the allied reserves being exhausted before those of the enemy", and that the United States would have to raise 100 divisions, requiring the call up of 300,000 conscripts a month, to raise an army of 4 million men. General Pershing also cabled Washington D.C., saying, "It should be most fully realized at home that the time has come for us to take up the brunt of the war and that France and England are not going to be able to keep their armies at present strength very much longer." Also, "If the Allies had seen this a year or even six months earlier and had given us assistance in shipping"..."they could have assisted in the formation of a powerful American Army". Instead, "the number of training infantrymen in America will be practically exhausted by the middle of July, they [the allies] still insisted on a program of infantry personnel", and, "The Prime Ministers and General Foch appeal most urgently for trained or even untrained men." In his memoirs, Pershing says about raising the army, "In its execution as a whole, the achievement stands out as a lasting monument to our War Department, marred only by the lack of foresight that made it necessary to send over untrained men and units in precipitate haste." Lord Milner had commented at a meeting of the X Committee on 17 May that some of the troops "hardly knew how to handle a rifle".

Originally planned for an army of 500,000 men, the US draft had to be expanded four times before a 4 million man army could be raised.

At the meeting, amidst concerns that—following the Treaty of Brest-Litovsk three months earlier—the Germans were about to requisition the Russian Black Sea Fleet, Lloyd George proposed the creation of a new post of Allied Supreme Naval Commander in the Mediterranean, suggesting Admiral Sir John Jellicoe ('Silent Jack'), former commander of the British Grand Fleet at the Battle of Jutland, for the position. The French were in favour of a combined Allied naval command, but the Italians were not, so nothing came of the suggestion.

==== 2–4 July 1918 ====
The seventh SWC Conference, held at Versailles, was attended by British Dominion Prime Ministers from Canada, Australia, Newfoundland, New Zealand, and South Africa. This was the most difficult SWC yet, with Lloyd George angry with the French at completely directing the war and the French upset with Lloyd George's plan to reduce British forces on the front to reinforce Palestine. General Foch wanted a commitment that the British would keep their strength at 59 divisions, and he wanted to create a sixtieth from category "B" troops (those unfit for combat, but suitable for home defence). Lloyd George said manpower resources made this impossible. Meanwhile, the North Russia intervention moved forward.

==== 5 October 1918 ====
The British received news that Germany, Austria-Hungary and the Ottoman Empire had informed the US Government that they were ready to negotiate peace on the basis of President Wilson's Fourteen Points.

==== 30 Oct to 10 Nov 1918 ====
The eighth, and longest SWC Conference took place in Versailles. Here, the Armistice terms were drafted for the Ottoman Empire, Austria-Hungary, and Germany.

=== Peacetime meetings ===
During the Paris Peace Negotiations, which took place from 12 January to 26 June 1919, the Supreme War Council became the "Council of Ten" in mid January, and later the "Council of Four" (Big Four) in mid March, as President Wilson and Prime Ministers Lloyd George, Clemenceau, and Orlando did most of the work constructing the Treaty of Versailles. As the host nation, Prime Minister Clemenceau presided over the meetings.

==== 14–16 January 1920 in Paris, France ====
This meeting was held four days after the ratification of the Treaty of Versailles. Lloyd George proposed dropping the blockade of the Russian Socialist Federal Soviet Republic by starting negotiations with the "Russian people" in the form of the centrosoyuz, which at that time was not controlled by the Bolsheviks. This was agreed, with a communique from the Council being published on 16 January. In the event, the negotiations soon became simply between the United Kingdom and a bolshevised centrosoyuz, leading to the Anglo-Soviet Trade Agreement.

==== 6–16 July 1920 in Spa, Belgium ====
This was attended by German delegates to discuss war reparations. Related documents:

- "Agreement between the Allies for the settlement of certain questions as to the application of the Treaties of Peace and complementary agreements with Germany, Austria, Hungary and Bulgaria"
- "Protocol of the Conference at Spa on July 16, 1920"
- "Inter-Allied Agreement in regard to advance to the German Government in accordance with Protocol of July 16 regarding coal deliveries"

== Sources ==
- Amery, Leo, My Political Life, Vol II, 1914-1929, London: Hutchinson, 1953
- Callwell, Sir C.E., Field Marshal Sir Henry Wilson, his life and times, Volume II, London: Cassell, 1927
- Churchill, Winston, The World Crisis, 1916-1918, Volume II, London: Thornton, 1927
- Colville, J. R., Man of Valour, London: Collins, 1972
- Cooper, Duff, Haig, The Second Volume, London: Faber and Faber, 1936
- Edmonds, Sir James E, History of the Great War, Military Operations, France & Belgium, the March Offensive, 1918, London: MacMillan, 1935
- Edmonds, Sir James E, History of the Great War, continued, May-July: The German Diversion Offensives and the First Allied Counter-Offensive, London: MacMillan, 1939
- Foch, Ferdinand (translated by Colonel Bentley Mott), The Memoirs of Marshal Foch, London: Willam Heinemann, 1931
- French, David, The Strategy of the Lloyd George Coalition, 1916-1918, New York: Oxford University Press, 1995
- Greenhalgh, Elizabeth (2005-12-08). Victory through Coalition: Britain and France during the First World War. Cambridge University Press. ISBN 9781139448475.
- Hankey, Maurice, The Supreme Command, Volume II (1914-1918), London: Allen, 1961
- Grigg, John (2002). Lloyd George: War Leader, 1916–1918. Allen Lane. ISBN 978-0571277490.
- Lloyd George, David, War Memoirs of David Lloyd George, Vol. IV, Boston: Little Brown, 1934
  - Lloyd George, David, War Memoirs of David Lloyd George, Vol. V, Boston: Little Brown, 1936
  - Lloyd George, David, War Memoirs of David Lloyd George, Vol. VI, Boston: Little Brown, 1937
- Marlowe, John, Milner: Apostle of Empire, London: Hamish Hamilton, 1976
- Mordacq, Henri, Unity of Command: How it Was Achieved, Paris: Tallandier, 1929 (translated from French)
- O'Brien, Terence, Milner, London: Constable, 1979
- Palmer, Frederick, Bliss, peacemaker; the life and letters of General Tasker Howard Bliss, Freeport, NY: Libraries Press, 1934
- Pershing, John J., My Experiences in the World War, Vol. II, New York: Frederick Stokes, 1931
- Powell, Geoffrey, Plumer: The Soldier's General, London: Leo Cooper, 1990
- Renshaw, Patrick (2014-07-10). The Longman Companion to America in the Era of the Two World Wars, 1910-1945. Routledge. ISBN 9781317895497.
- Roskill, Stephen, Hankey: Man of Secrets, Volume I, 1877-1918, London: Collins, 1970
- Shotwell, James, At the Paris Peace Conference, New York: MacMillan, 1937
- The Times (of London) archive (requires a subscription)
- Woodward, David R., Field Marshal Sir William Robertson, Westport Connecticut & London: Praeger, 1998, ISBN 0-275-95422-6
- Wright, Peter, At the Supreme War Council, New York: G.P. Puntam, 1921
- The Supreme War Council, First World War.com, accessed 6 August 2009
- author unknown, A League of Nations, Boston: World Peace Foundation, 1918 (OCLC Number: 5455525)
- UK National Archives online
- Lagarde, Lieutenant Benoît. "Grand Quartier Général des Armées Alliées, 1914–1918" (PDF). Sous-Serie GR 15 NN – Répertoire Numérique Detaillé (in French). Service Historique de la Défense. Archived from the original (PDF) on 10 December 2016.
- LG/F/148/4/1, 2 & 3 in Lloyd George papers, see UK Parliament Archives
