= Storr =

Storr is a surname of Old Scandinavian origin, and may refer to

- AJ Storr (born 2003), American basketball player
- Anthony Storr (1920–2001), English psychiatrist and author
- Catherine Storr (1913–2001), English novelist and children's writer
- Farrah Storr (born 1978), British journalist
- Glen Milton Storr (1921–1990), Australian biologist
- Gottlieb Conrad Christian Storr (1749–1821), German physician and naturalist
- Jamie Storr (born 1975), Canadian ice hockey player
- John Storr (1709–1783), British naval officer
- Lancelot Storr (1874–1944), British army officer
- Paul Storr (1771–1844), London silversmith
- Peter Storr (born 1965), British equestrian
- Robert Storr (art academic), American curator, critic and painter
- Robert Storr (banker) (1920–1992), Australian banker
- Vernon Storr (1869–1940), English priest
- Will Storr, British journalist

== See also ==
- The Storr
- Storrs (disambiguation)
