= Governor Cooper =

Governor Cooper may refer to:

- Job Adams Cooper (1843–1899), 6th Governor of Colorado
- Myers Y. Cooper (1873–1958), 51st Governor of Ohio
- Prentice Cooper (1895–1969), 39th Governor of Tennessee
- Robert Archer Cooper (1874–1953), 93rd Governor of South Carolina
- Roy Cooper (born 1957), 75th Governor of North Carolina
- William B. Cooper (Delaware politician) (1771–1849), 32nd Governor of Delaware
