= 1888 Colorado gubernatorial election =

- November 6, 1888
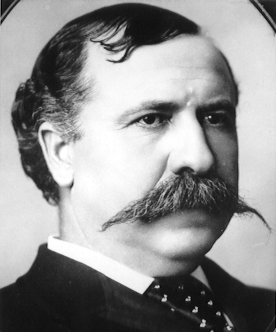

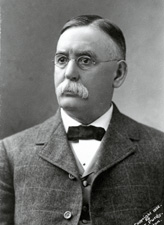
Nominee	Job Adams Cooper	Thomas M. Patterson
Party	Republican	Democratic
Popular vote	49,490	39,197
Percentage	53.84%	42.64%
- County results Cooper: 40–50% 50–60% 60–70% Patterson: 40–50% 50–60%
Governor before election
Alva Adams
Democratic
Elected Governor
Job Adams Cooper
Republican

The 1888 Colorado gubernatorial election was held on November 6, 1888. Republican nominee Job Adams Cooper defeated Democratic nominee Thomas M. Patterson with 53.84% of the vote.

== General election ==
=== Candidates ===
Major party candidates

- Job Adams Cooper, Republican
- Thomas M. Patterson, Democratic

Other candidates

- William C. Stover, Prohibition
- Gilbert De La Matyr, Greenback

=== Results ===
1888 Colorado gubernatorial election
Party	Candidate	Votes	%	±%
Republican	Job Adams Cooper	49,490	53.84%	+8.29%
Democratic	Thomas M. Patterson	39,197	42.64%	−7.02%
Prohibition	William C. Stover	2,098	2.28%	−2.32%
Greenback	Gilbert De La Matyr	1,085	1.18%	
Majority		10,293	+11.20%	
Turnout		91,870		
Republican gain from Democratic		Swing		

County	Cooper %	Cooper #	Patterson %	Patterson #	Stover %	Stover #	Delamatyr %	Delamatyr #	Total
Arapahoe	55.04%	11,220	42.27%	8,616	2.27%	463	0.41%	84	20,383
Archuleta	60.78%	124	39.21%	80	0.00%	0	0.00%	0	204
Bent	50.73%	1,317	42.60%	1,106	2.81%	73	3.85%	100	2,596
Boulder	52.24%	1,558	42.92%	1,280	4.19%	125	0.63%	19	2,982
Chaffee	54.04%	1,230	43.84%	998	1.84%	42	0.26%	6	2,276
Clear Creek	59.24%	1,224	35.52%	734	4.69%	97	0.53%	11	2,066
Conejos	58.89%	980	40.92%	681	0.18%	3	0.00%	0	1,664
Costilla	56.01%	503	42.98%	386	0.44%	4	0.55%	5	898
Custer	60.16%	574	39.20%	374	0.52%	5	0.10%	1	954
Delta	44.57%	259	40.61%	236	4.30%	25	10.49%	61	581
Dolores	56.91%	140	43.08%	106	0.00%	0	0.00%	0	246
Douglas	53.29%	388	41.75%	305	4.94%	36	0.00%	0	728
Eagle	55.65%	561	44.04%	444	0.29%	3	0.00%	0	1,006
El Paso	60.24%	2,156	36.26%	1,298	3.49%	125	0.00%	0	3,579
Elbert	56.86%	787	41.97%	581	1.01%	14	0.14%	2	1,384
Fremont	48.44%	1,090	35.73%	804	3.95%	89	11.86%	267	2,250
Garfield	54.55%	1,066	44.01%	860	1.43%	28	0.00%	0	1,954
Gilpin	51.64%	927	40.05%	719	5.40%	97	2.89%	52	1,795
Grand	64.94%	163	34.26%	86	0.39%	1	0.39%	1	251
Gunnison	53.25%	867	41.83%	681	0.85%	14	4.05%	66	1,628
Hinsdale	55.10%	151	44.89%	123	0.00%	0	0.00%	0	274
Huerfano	49.00%	713	49.07%	714	1.85%	27	0.06%	1	1,455
Jefferson	51.66%	949	43.33%	796	4.68%	86	0.32%	6	1,837
La Plata	49.75%	829	48.19%	809	0.48%	8	1.56%	26	1,666
Lake	52.16%	2,798	46.86%	2,514	0.96%	52	0.00%	0	5,364
Larimer	55.38%	1,255	36.49%	827	7.81%	177	0.30%	7	2,266
Las Animas	48.45%	2,705	50.16%	2,800	1.07%	60	0.30%	17	5,582
Logan	55.64%	1,060	39.68%	756	4.67%	89	0.00%	0	1,905
Mesa	48.80%	429	44.25%	389	6.59%	58	0.34%	3	879
Montrose	55.21%	508	41.73%	384	2.28%	21	0.76%	7	920
Ouray	52.52%	914	45.57%	793	0.34%	6	1.55%	27	1,740
Park	54.99%	749	44.64%	608	0.36%	5	0.00%	0	1,364
Pitkin	49.94%	1,390	48.72%	1,356	1.22%	34	0.10%	3	2,783
Pueblo	50.66%	2,259	46.44%	2,071	1.34%	60	1.54%	69	4,459
Rio Grande	61.67%	457	35.62%	264	1.88%	14	0.80%	6	741
Routt	61.70%	361	37.94%	222	0.34%	2	0.00%	0	585
Saguache	58.00%	598	41.51%	428	0.48%	5	0.00%	0	1,031
San Juan	56.42%	395	43.58%	305	0.00%	0	0.00%	0	700
San Miguel	55.34%	518	44.01%	412	0.32%	3	0.32%	3	936
Summit	50.55%	636	49.20%	619	0.07%	1	0.15%	2	1,258
Washington	58.12%	798	38.21%	526	2.69%	37	0.87%	12	1,373
Weld	55.93%	1,884	33.04%	1,113	4.72%	159	6.29%	212	3,368

Counties that flipped from Democratic to Republican

- Bent
- Boulder
- Chaffee
- Conejos
- Delta
- Gunnison
- Jefferson
- La Plata
- Lake
- Larimer
- Ouray
- Pueblo
- Weld
- San Miguel
- Summit
- Saguache

Counties that flipped from Republican to Democratic

- Huerfano

Counties that flipped from Tied to Republican

- Montrose
