= Lago del Frassino =

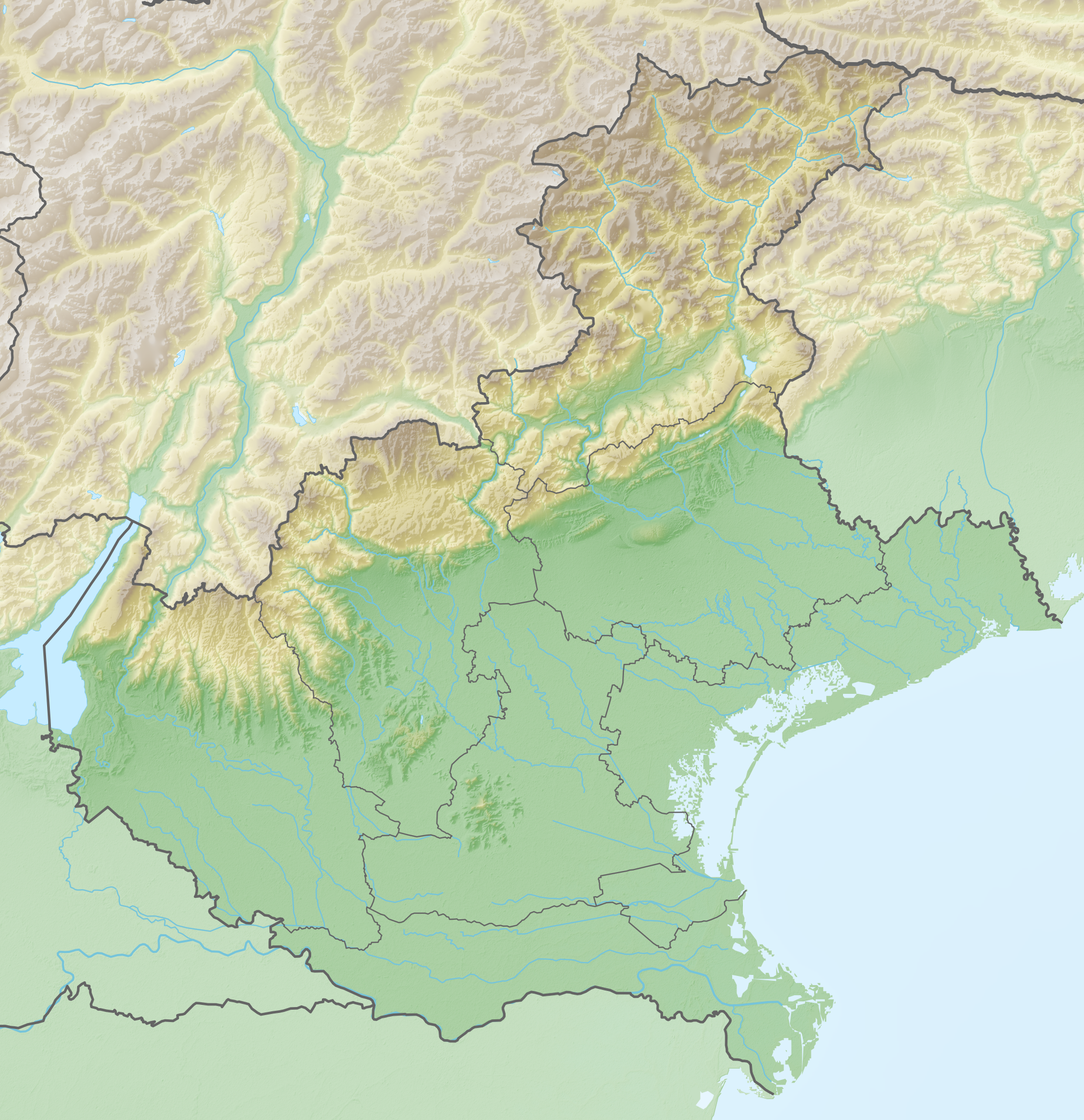
- Location within Veneto
- Location: Province of Verona, Veneto
- Coordinates: 45°26′12.15″N 10°40′1.65″E
- Basin countries: Italy
- Surface area: 0.8 km^{2} (0.31 sq mi)
- Surface elevation: 80 m (260 ft)

Lago del Frassino
UNESCO World Heritage Site
- Interactive map of Lago del Frassino
- Location: Peschiera del Garda, Verona, Veneto
- Part of: Prehistoric pile dwellings around the Alps
- Criteria: Cultural: (iv), (v)
- Reference: 1363-032
- Inscription: 2011 (35th Session)
- Website: whc.unesco.org/en/list/1363/
- Coordinates: 45°26′12.15″N 10°40′01.65″E

Lago del Frassino is a lake in Peschiera del Garda, Province of Verona, Veneto, Italy. At an elevation of 80 m, its surface area is 0.8 km².

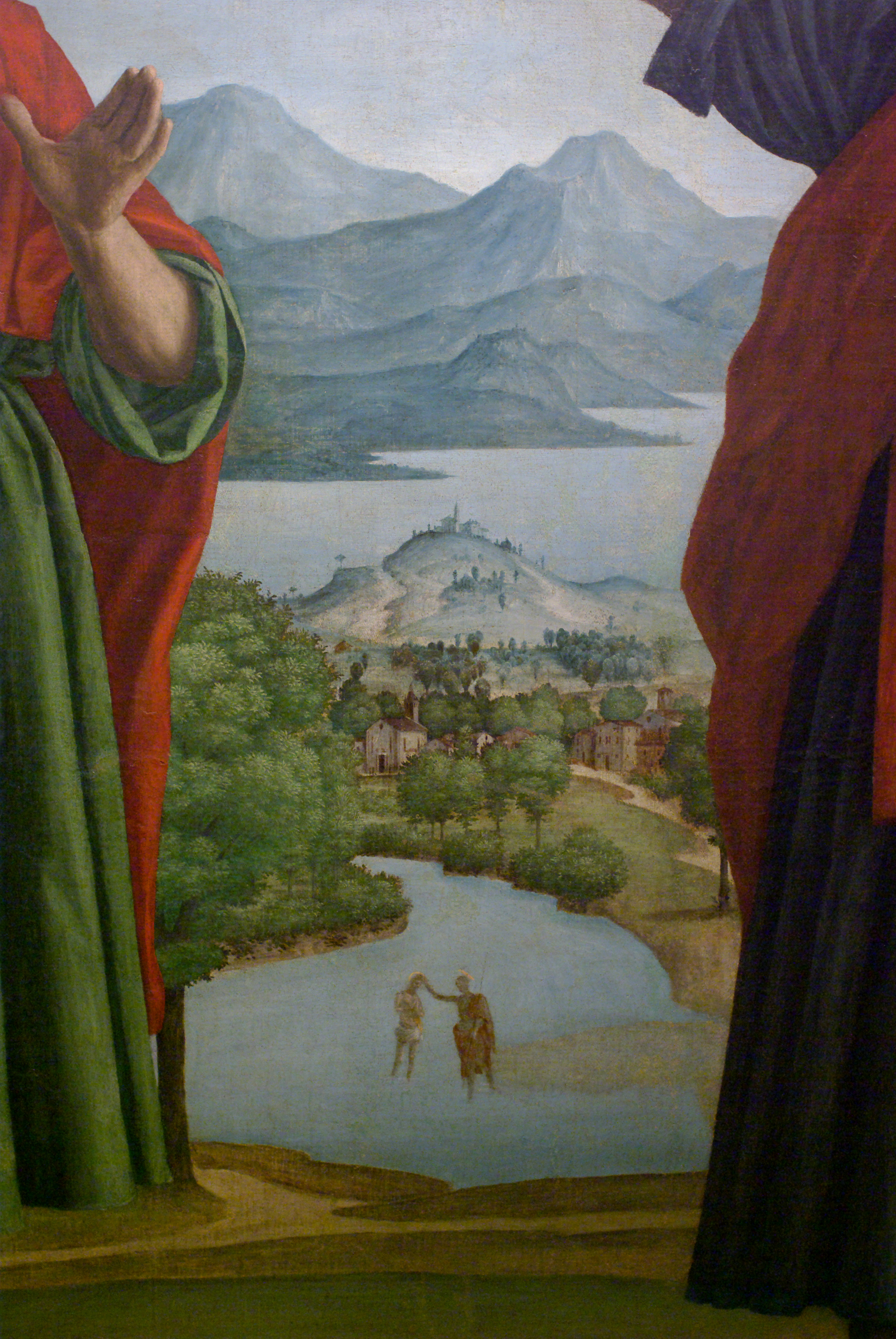
Paint with a view of the Lake Garda and Lake Frassino or River Mincio, by Girolamo dai Libri

At 2012 site of global importance for migratory birds, recognized by Community europae (Direttiva 92/43/CEE) that threatens to disappear. There are the Morette and the rare frog Lataste. If so rare animals choose this place for so small refuge is rich of its natural value, despite this the streams are captured to irrigate the fields leaving at certain times of semi-dry, suspected illegal discharges of pollutants, persistent requests building permits, illegal fire of 6-9/march / 2012 and not to mention how the cane is processed (until at least 2012) ... a paradise threatened by the man, L'Arena 22/02/2012 The Arena 22/02/2012 The idea of the WWF: "The lake of Ash site is protected" Flora and fauna of lake.
