= Peschiera del Garda =

Peschiera del Garda Pischera (Venetian)
- Comune
- Comune di Peschiera del Garda
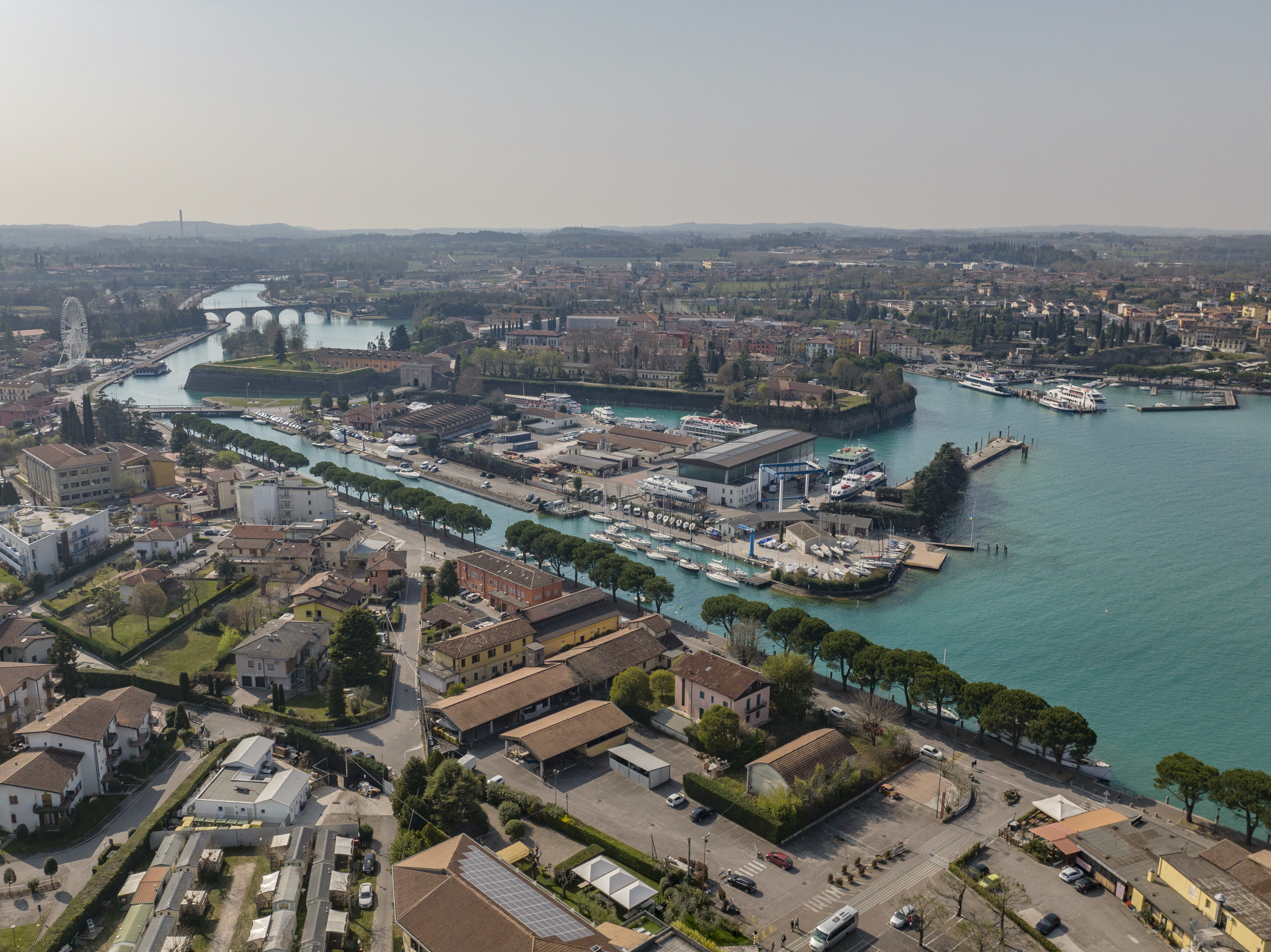
- Aerial view

- Coat of arms

- Location within Italy Location within Veneto
- Coordinates: 45°26′N 10°41′E
- Country: Italy
- Region: Veneto
- Province: Verona (VR)
- Frazioni: Broglie, San Benedetto di Lugana, Zanina

Government
  - Mayor: Gaiulli Orietta Maria

Area
  - Total: 17.63 km^{2} (6.81 sq mi)
- Elevation: 68 m (223 ft)

Population (31 December 2020)
  - Total: 10,856
  - Density: 615.8/km^{2} (1,595/sq mi)
- Demonym: Arilicensi
- Time zone: UTC+1 (CET)
  - Summer (DST): UTC+2 (CEST)
- Postal code: 37019, 37010
- Dialing code: 045
- Patron saint: Saint Martin
- Saint day: November 11
- Website: Official website

Fortified Town of Peschiera
- Location: Peschiera, Province of Verona, Veneto, Italy

UNESCO World Heritage Site
- Type: Cultural
- Criteria: iii, iv
- Designated: 2017 (41 Session)
- Part of: Venetian Works of Defence between 15th and 17th centuries: Stato da Terra – western Stato da Mar
- Reference no.: 1533
- Region: Europe and North America

Peschiera del Garda (Italian pronunciation: [peˈskjɛːra del ˈɡarda]; Venetian: Pischera; Latin: Ardelica, Arilica) is a town and comune in the province of Verona, in Veneto, Italy. When Lombardy-Venetia was under Austrian rule, Peschiera was the northwest anchor of the four fortified towns constituting the Quadrilatero. The fortress is on an island in the river Mincio at its outlet from Lake Garda.

The town is encircled by massive Venetian defensive systems that have been a UNESCO World Heritage Site since 9 July 2017.

== History ==
Roman Ardelica was a town of Gallia Transpadana that occupied the site of the modern Peschiera del Garda, at the southeast angle of the Lacus Benacus (Lago di Garda), just where the Mincius (modern Mincio) issued from the lake. The name is found under the corrupted form Ariolica in the Tabula Peutingeriana, which correctly places it between Brixia and Verona; the true form is preserved by inscriptions, of which one says that it was a trading place, with a corporation of ship-owners, collegium naviculariorum Ardelicensium. (Orell. Inscr. 4108.) The town is mentioned as Arilica in Pliny the Elder's Naturalis Historia.

The fortress at Peschiera played a prominent part in most military campaigns conducted in northern Italy after 1400, especially during the Italian campaigns of the French Revolutionary Wars and the Napoleonic Wars. At the Battle of Peschiera fought on 6 August 1796, the day after the major French victory at the Battle of Castiglione, a French force commanded by general Masséna drove out the Austrians. After the Siege of Peschiera, during the First Italian War of Independence, it was taken by the Piedmontese from the Austrians, following a gallant defence by general Rath lasting six weeks, on 30 May 1848.

During World War I, the Peschiera conference between the British and French premiers and the Italian king took place on 8 November 1917.

Peschiera del Garda was also known for its military jail, which closed in 2002.

The commune is part of the Associazione Città del vino ("Association of Wine Cities").

In winter, the nearby Laghetto del Frassino is the most important habitat for tufted ducks in Italy (Morbioli & Sighele 2006).

== World Heritage Sites ==
Main sights of Peschiera del Garda
- It is home to one or more prehistoric pile-dwelling (or stilt house) settlements that are part of the Prehistoric Pile dwellings around the Alps UNESCO World Heritage Site.
  - location Belvedere;
  - location lake of Frassino;
- The fortress and the external fortifications. They were included in UNESCO's World Heritage Site list as part of "Venetian Works of Defence between the 16th and 17th centuries: Stato da Terra – western Stato da Mar" in 2017.

== Main sights ==
- Sanctuary of Madonna del Frassino (1511). It houses works by Paolo Farinati and Zeno da Verona.

== Transport ==
Peschiera del Garda railway station, opened in 1854, forms part of the Milan–Venice railway. The town is additionally served by ferry services, which connect it to other towns on the coast of Lake Garda, including Sirmione and Desenzano del Garda.

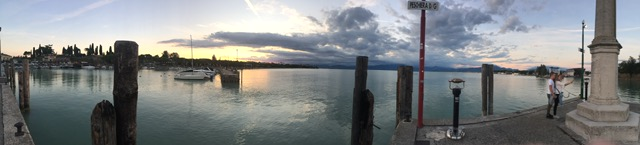
A panoramic photograph of the Marina of Peschiera del Garda during sunset, with the Lake and the Italian Alps visible.

== Gallery ==
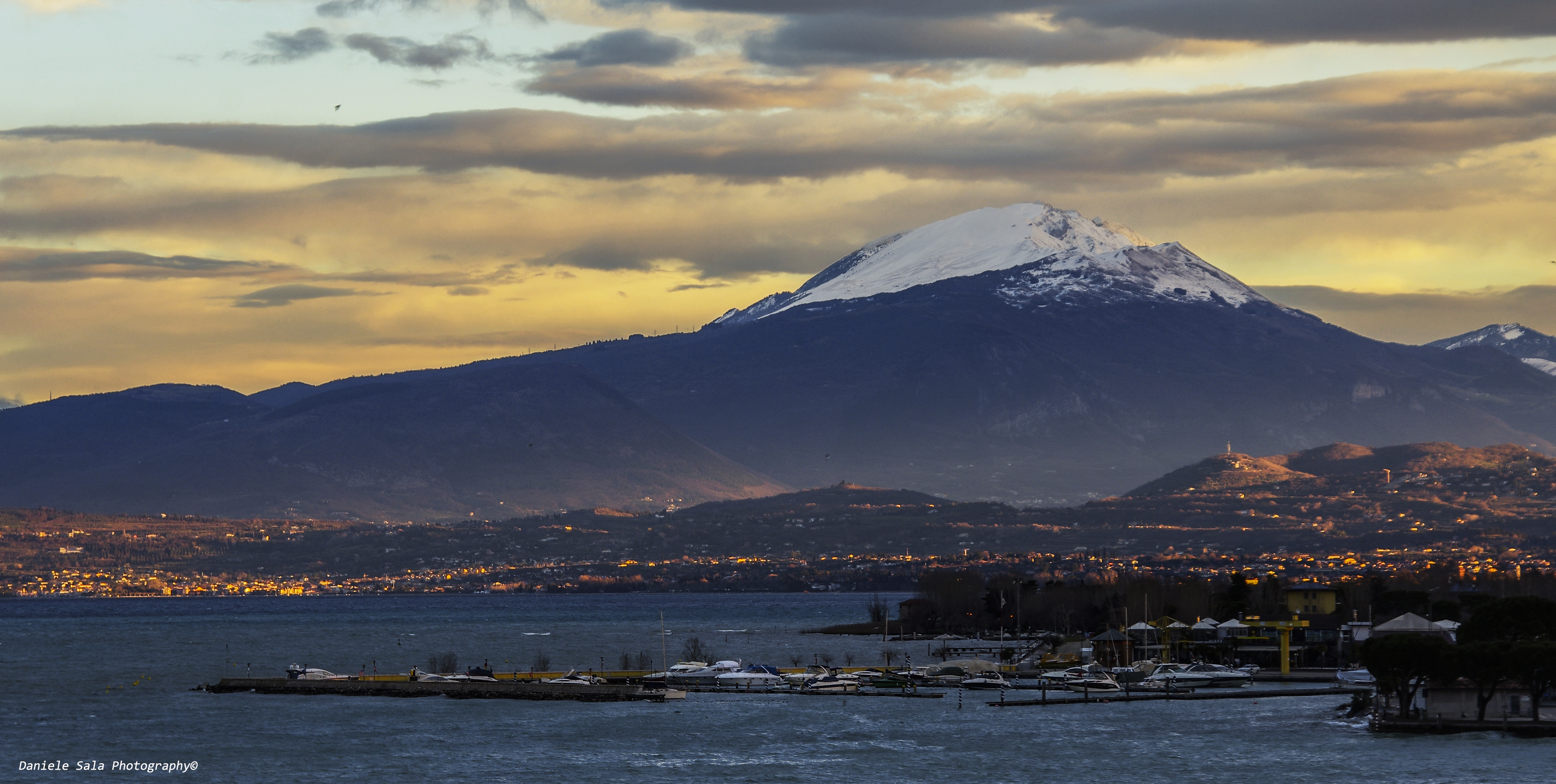
The new port and Monte Baldo

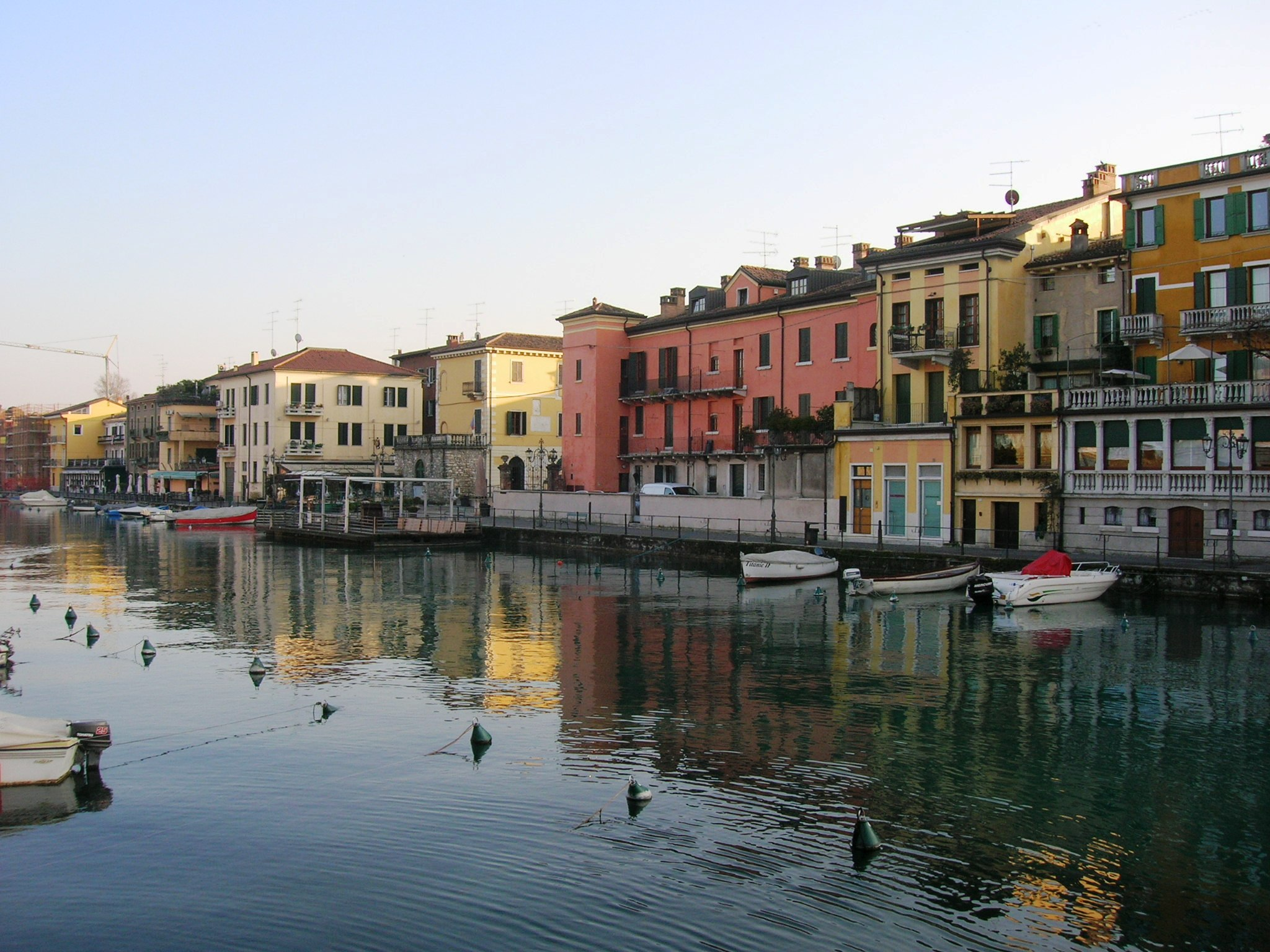

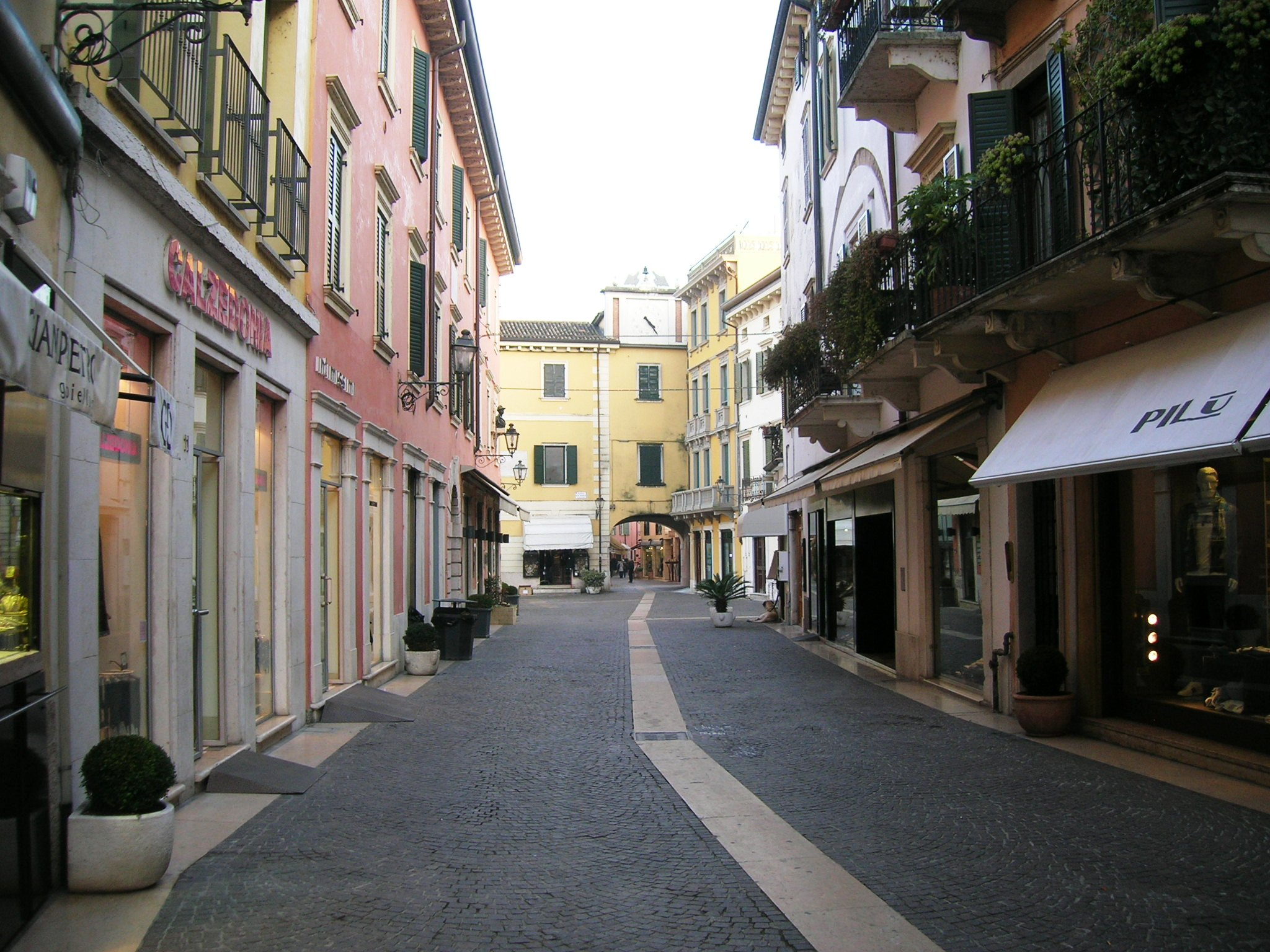

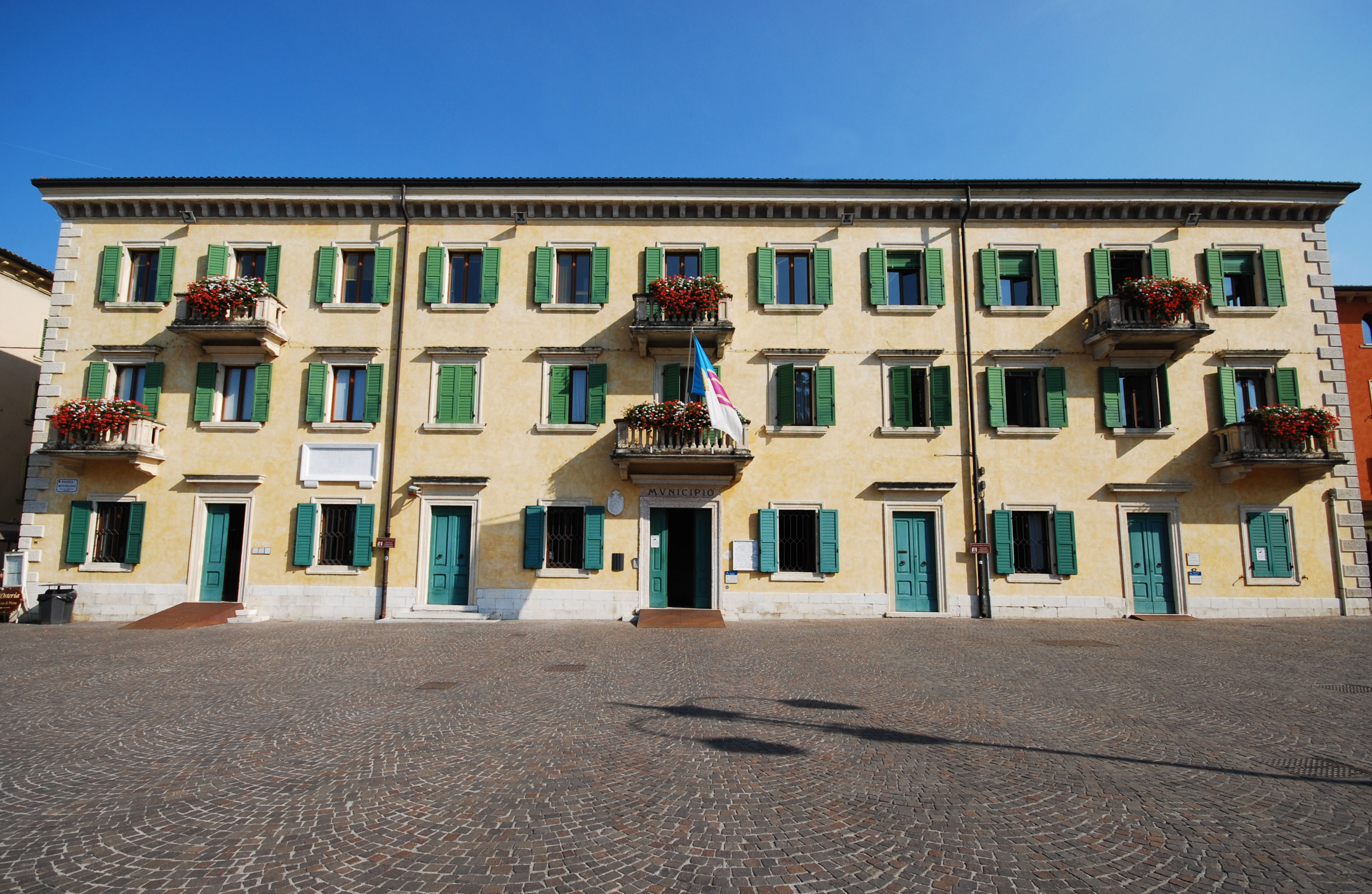
City Hall

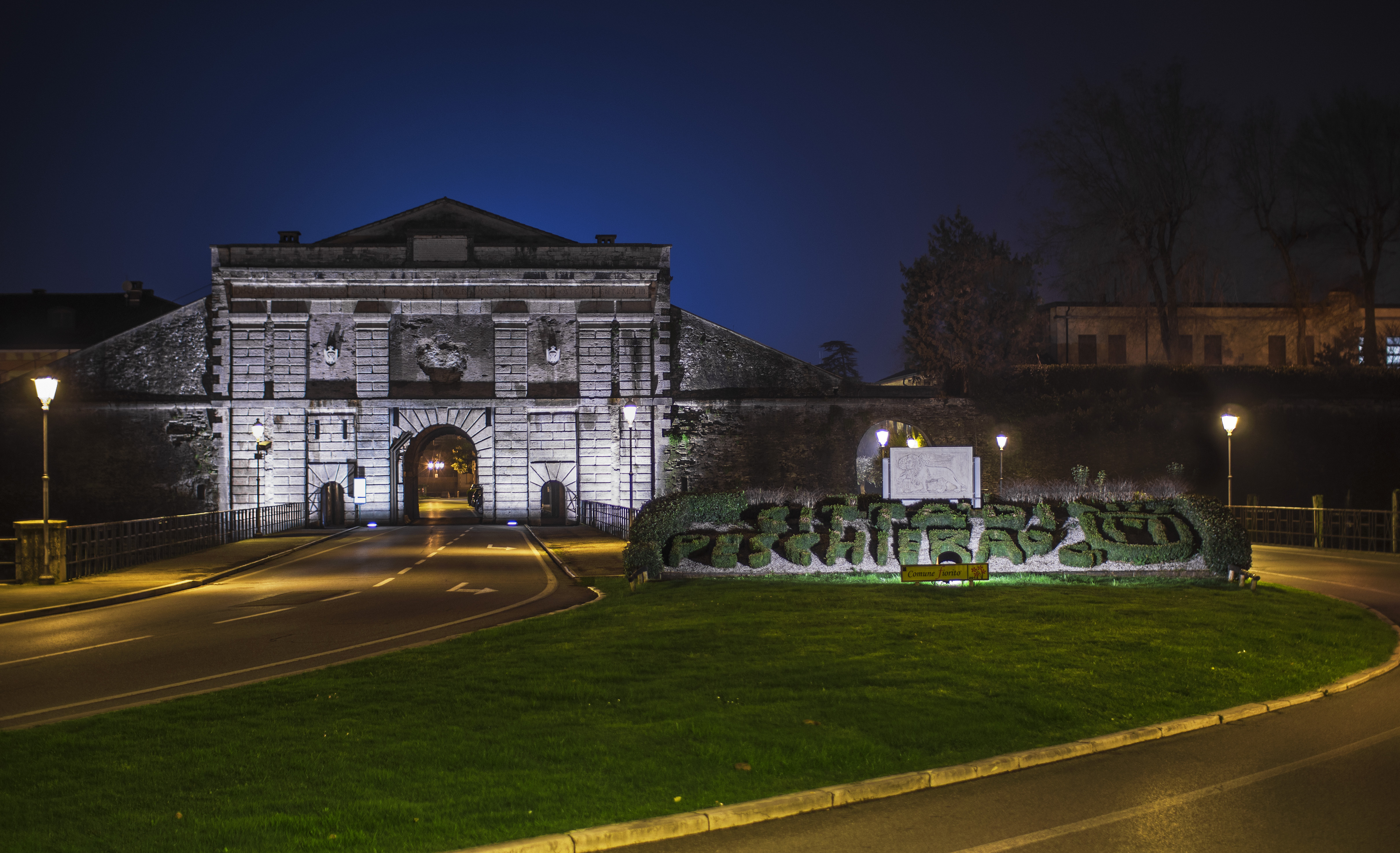
Porta Verona. A renovation of the old Venetian fortifications surrounding the town, now a UNESCO World Heritage Site.

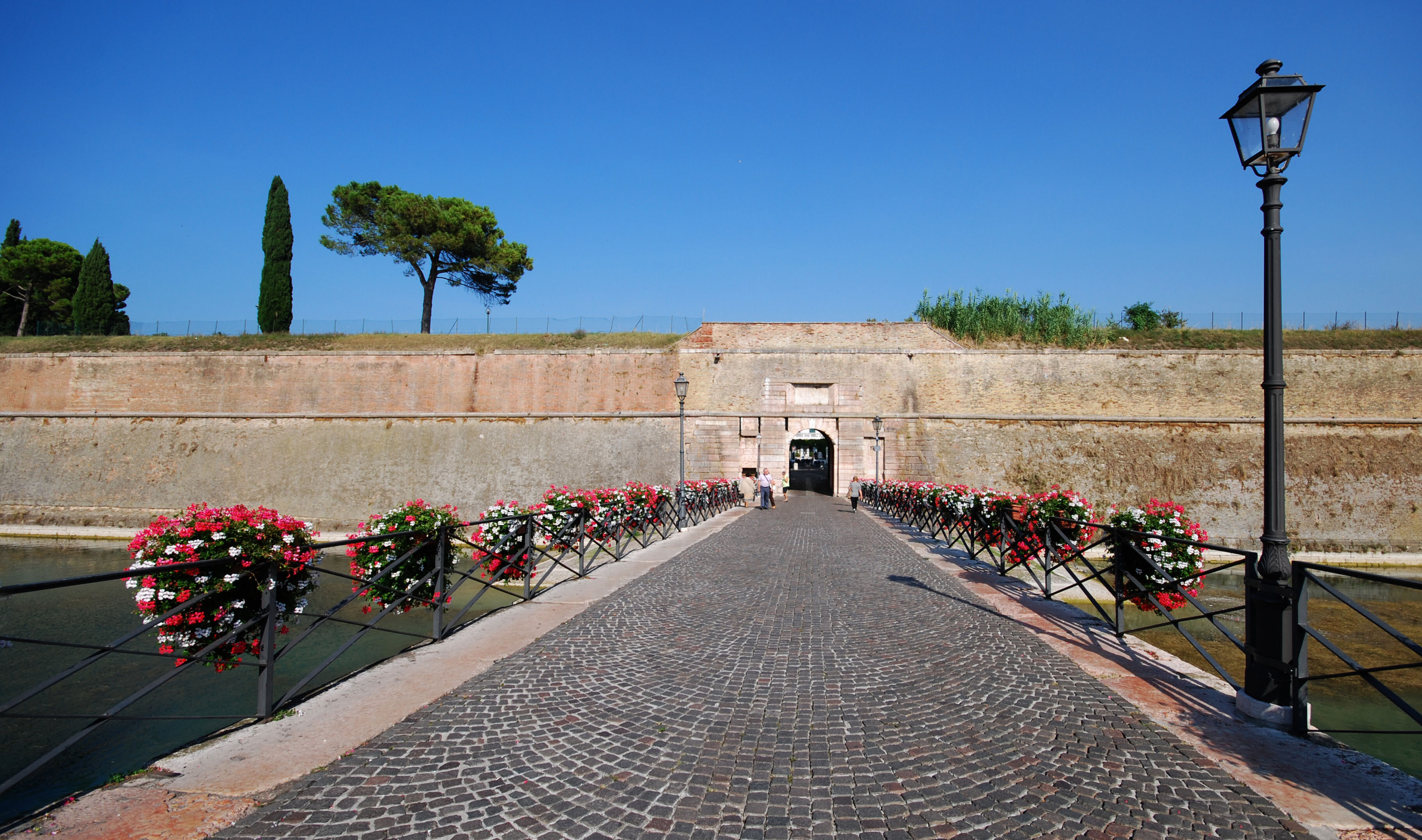
Porta Brescia - Brescia Gate

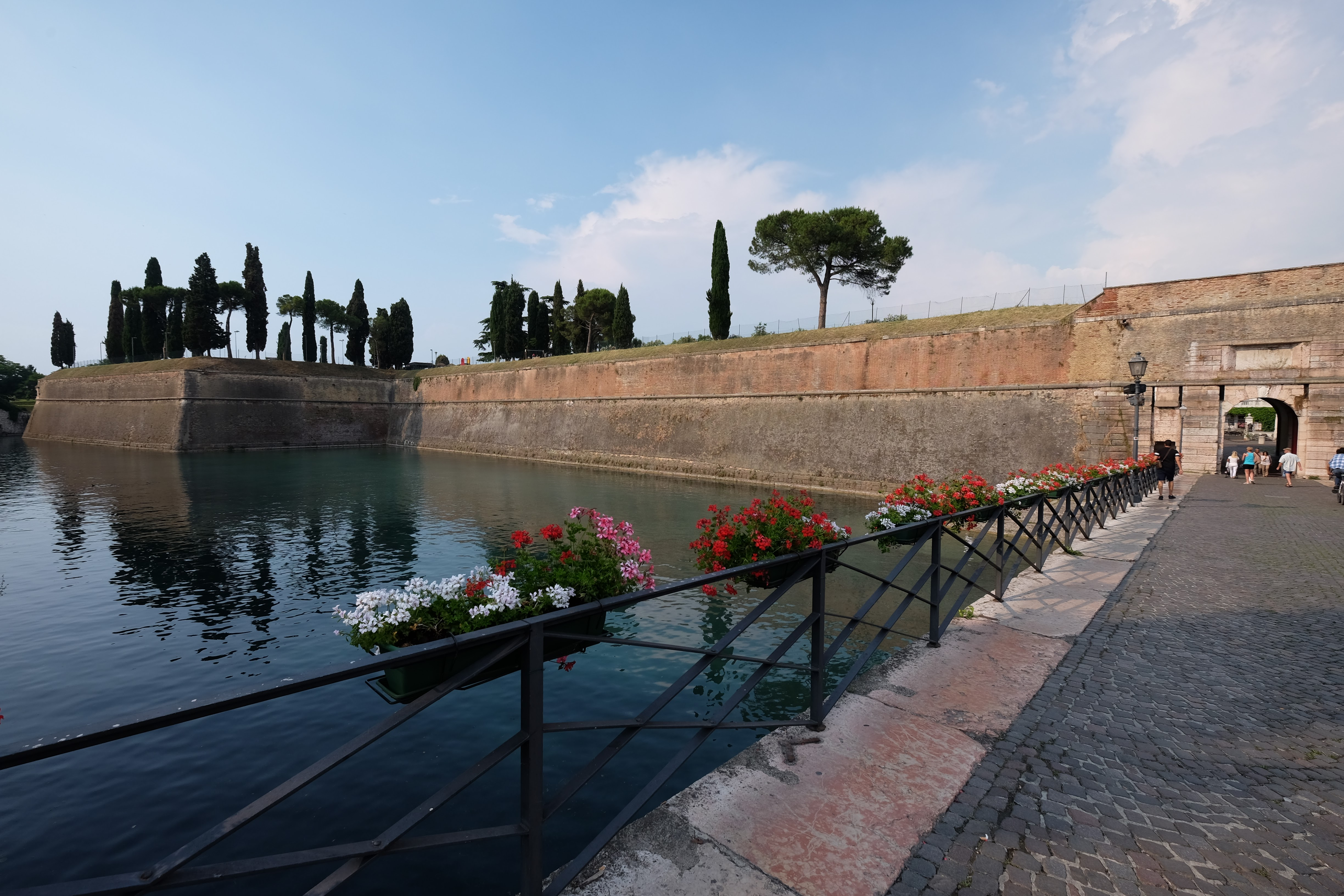
Porta Brescia - Brescia Gate

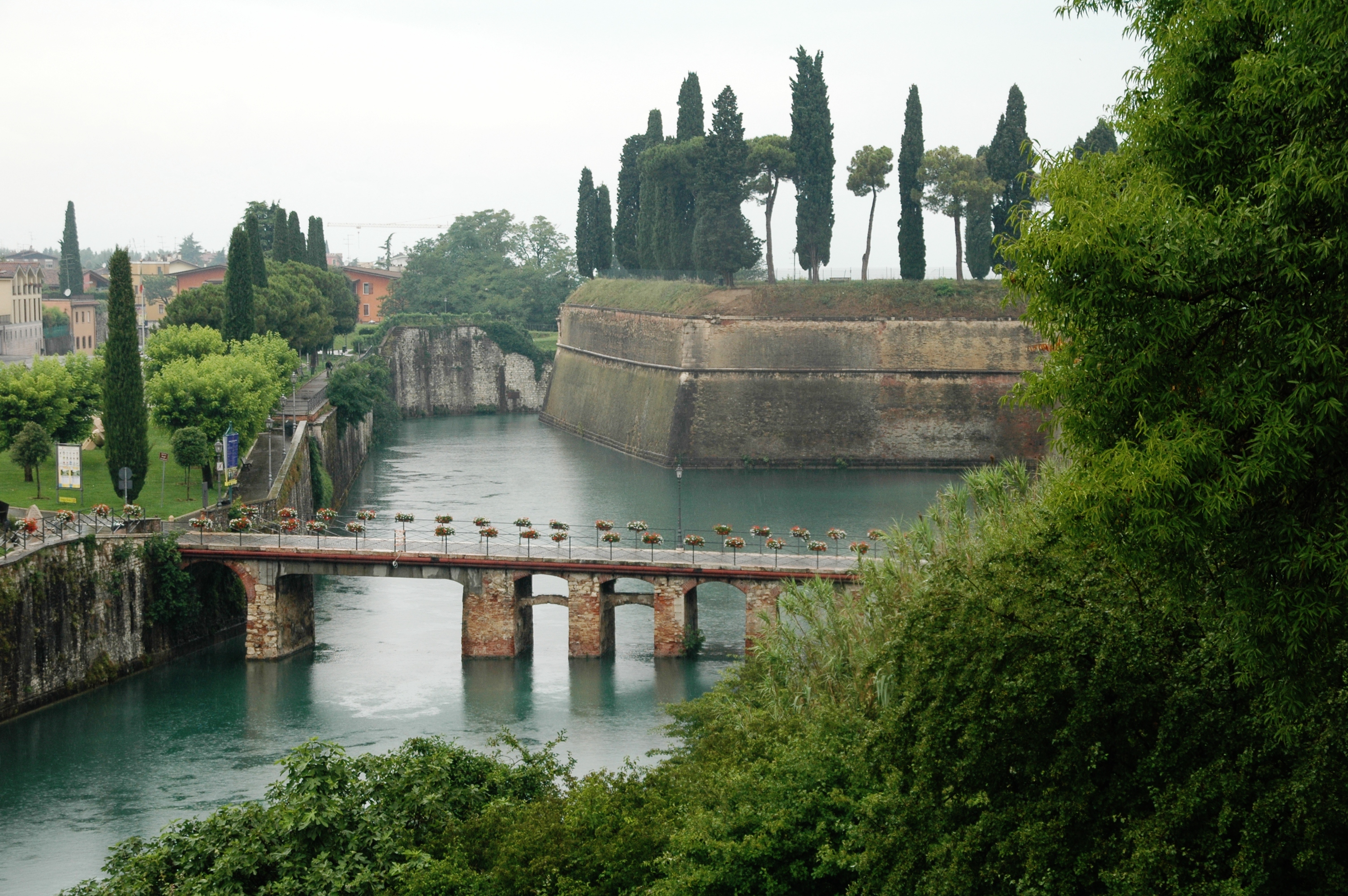
The fortress

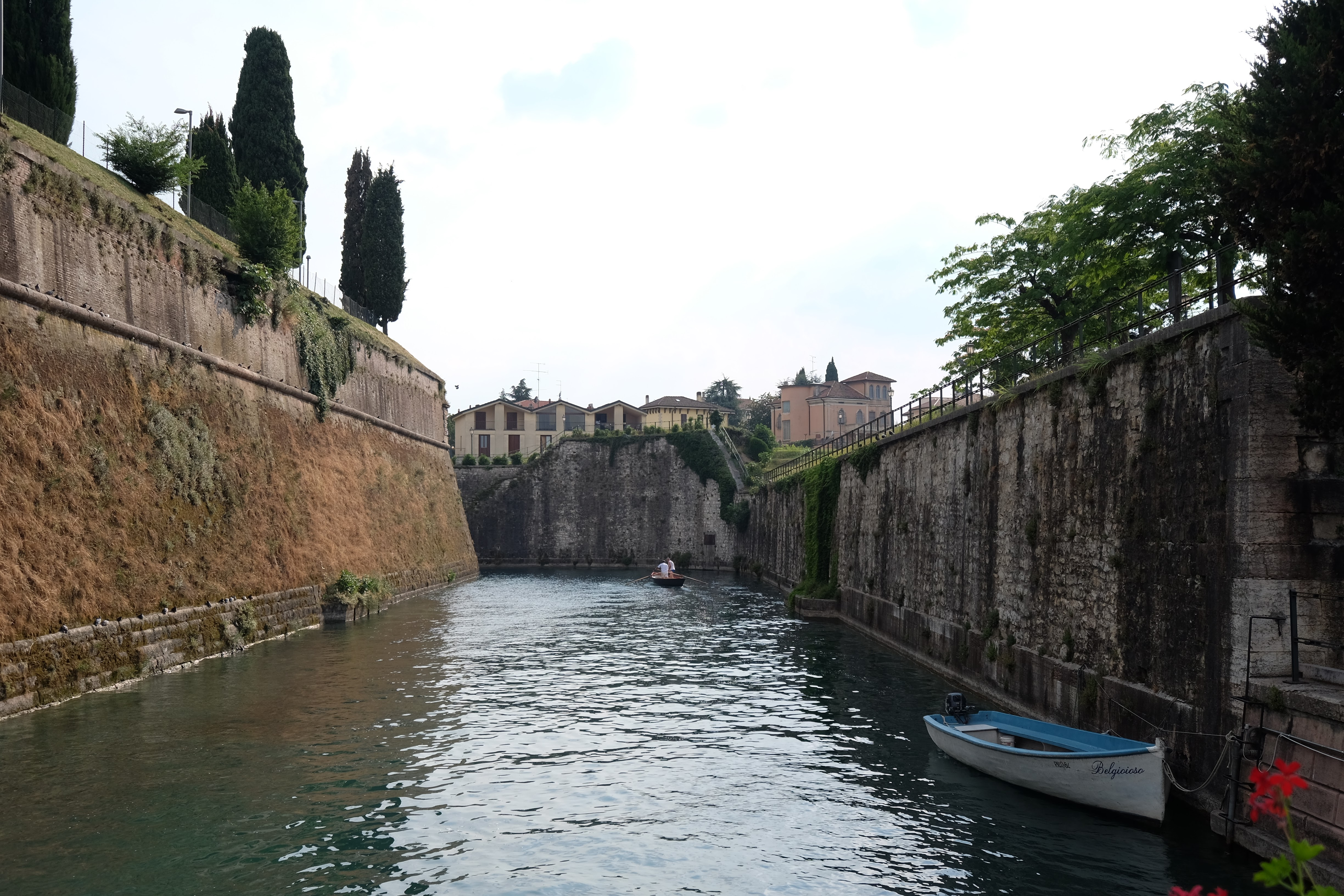
The fortress

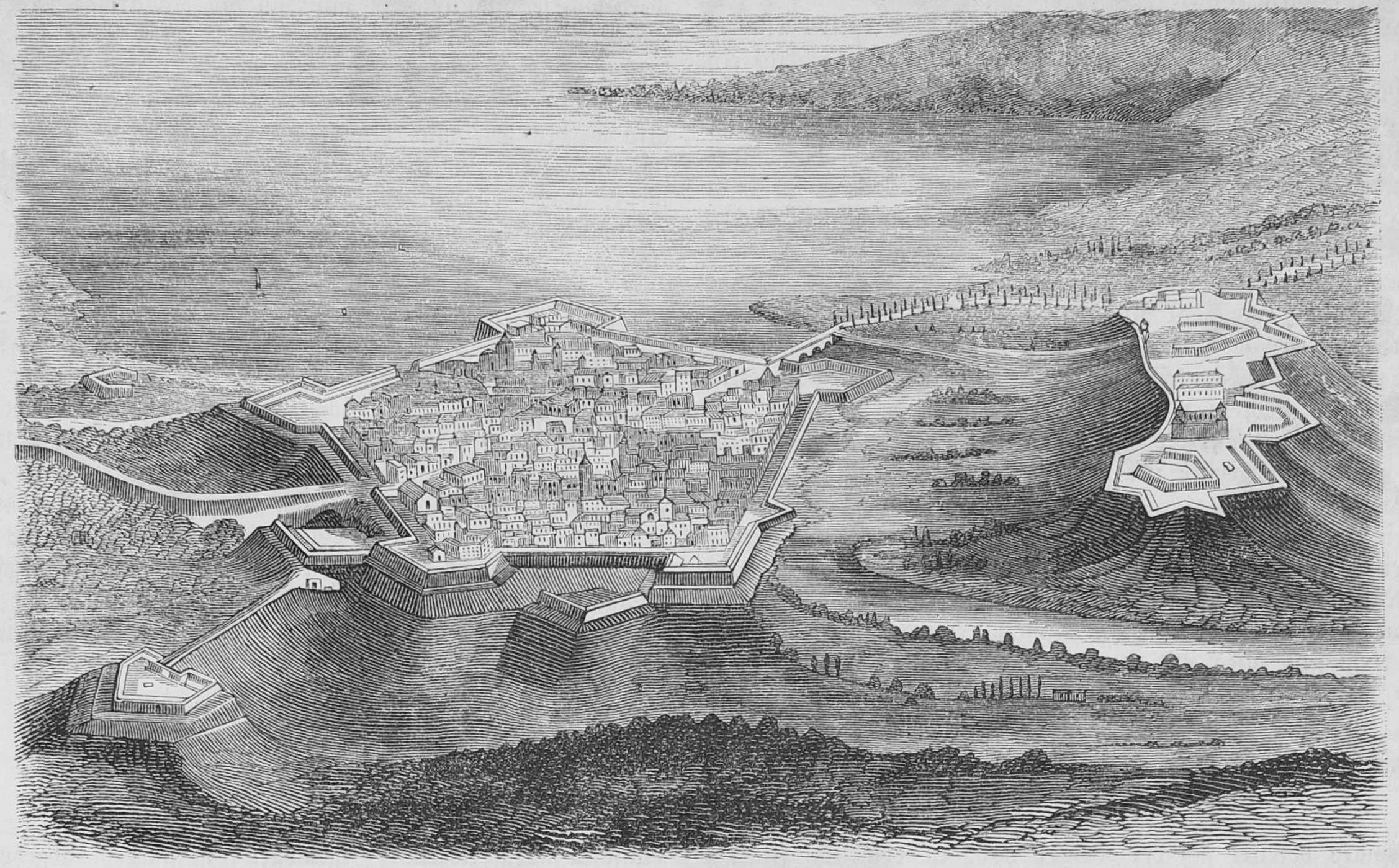
The fortress (1866)

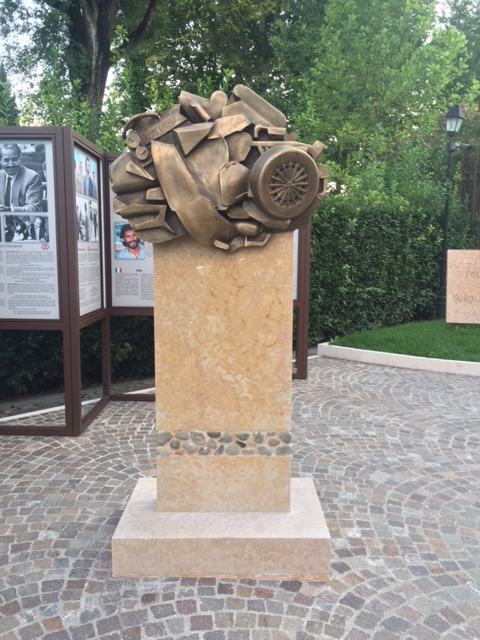
The monument to Giovanni Falcone, meant to represent a fragment of the car in which he was assassinated by the Mafia.

== Bounding communes ==
- Castelnuovo del Garda
- Valeggio sul Mincio
- Ponti sul Mincio
- Pozzolengo
- Sirmione
- Desenzano del Garda

== Twin cities ==
- Ula Tirso, Italy
- Capoterra, Italy
- Villa Carlos Paz, Argentina

== See also ==
- Rocca di Manerba del Garda
