= National Congress of Neighborhood Women =

- Brochure for NCNW, undated
- Abbreviation: NCNW
- Formation: 1974
- Type: NGO
- Purpose: Support network
- Region served: United States
- Members: private persons
- Official language: English
- Website: neighborhoodwomen.org/national-congress-of-neighborhood-women/

National Congress of Neighborhood Women is a support group for grassroots women's organizations and community leaders involved in providing voices for poor and working-class women.

== History ==
In 1969 Jan Peterson moved to New York City and joined the Conselyea Street Block Association, which consisted of many local women from the Williamsburg and Greenpoint neighborhoods of Brooklyn. Peter also volunteered at the Congress of Racial Equality in Harlem; she also participated in anti-poverty and feminist organizations. Her activism and experiences living in Brooklyn inspired her to explore opportunities to create a multi-ethnic, inter-racial community organization to help better the poor and working-class neighborhood she lived in. In 1973 Peterson met other grassroots activists and professional women at an event sponsored by the National Center for Urban Ethnic Affairs. This group, along with Peterson, created a national conference of working-class women, which was hosted in Washington, D.C., in 1974. One year later, at their second conference, the "first national federation of blue collar, neighborhood women" formed.

Located at 145 Skillman Ave in Brooklyn, the group made sought to give a voice to poor and working-class women, encouraging them to become community leaders. Their stated primary concerns included improving community leadership roles for women, giving access to affordable day care, neighborhood-based college programs for female returning students, advocating for the Displaced Homemakers bill, working towards neighborhood revitalization, eliminating redlining, establishing seniors centers, establishing shelters for battered women, supporting the J.P. Stevens textile boycott, and supporting affirmative action for women.

NCNW's first program was a community-based higher education project, which started in 1975. The organization worked with Empire State College and community colleges and helped design courses for adult women, active within their communities, seeking to become better leaders through knowledge and improved skills. The program, which worked with NCNW's first employment program, Project Open Doors, which provided participating women apprenticeship experience with community organizations in New York City.

=== 1980s ===
In the 1980s the organization began pre-College adult education courses in math, literacy, ESL, and GED training. In 1986, NCNW opened an alternative education, pre-employment, leadership training program for young people called "You Can" Community School. During this time, NCNW also formed the Leadership Training and Support Program. The program provided workshops and training at regional and national conferences, bringing in affiliated organizations from the United States to participate. These workshops formed support groups, which allowed neighborhood women, nationwide, to become aware about class struggle, racism, sexism, and the effects of these issues on community leader empowerment. In the mid-1980s the organization underwent a restructuring, expanding its national program. NCNW co-founded the UN-sponsored International Women's Conference which was first held in Nairobi in 1985. In 1986, the Neighborhood Women of Williamsburg/Greenpoint (NWWG) was formed to administer local programming, allowing the national NCNW to offer national training and programming. During this time, NCNW expanded into Appalachia, the Pacific Northwest, Puerto Rico, and Native American communities.

In 1985, representatives from NCNW attended the United Nations Third World Conference, which focused on women in Kenya. Taking notice on the lack of participation of poor and working-class women in Kenya, NCNW worked with other grassroots women's international organizations and formed GROOTS International (Grassroots Organizations Operating Together in Sisterhood). In 1986, NCNW began donating their archives to the Sophia Smith Collection at Smith College.

=== Current ===
After the formation of GROOTs, NCNW became the North American representation for the organization. They also began partnering with the Huairou Commission. In the 1990s NCNW gained consulting status with the United Nations, opening an office at the headquarters.

The Leadership Support Group remains the organizations primary program, providing national support for women to share experiences and skills with their peers. Martha Ackelsberg summarized NCNW's work aim as "to unite women across differences in work to secure for all people decent jobs, wages, housing and other life basics."
