= Rapallo and Peschiera conferences =

Meetings in Italy of the prime ministers of Italy, France and Britain during World War I

Coordinates: 44.3426°N 9.2304°E

The Rapallo conference (5 November 1917) and the Peschiera conference (8 November 1917) were meetings of the prime ministers of Italy, France and Britain—Vittorio Orlando, Paul Painlevé and David Lloyd George—during World War I in Rapallo and Peschiera in Italy following the Italians' defeat at the Battle of Caporetto.

The conferences were held in Italy to reassure the Italians of the Allied commitment to them and of their status as equals. At Rapallo, the French and British premiers refused to entrust their troops in Italy to the command of General Luigi Cadorna and demanded his dismissal. Although he later presented this as a great humiliation, Orlando had made the sacking of Cadorna a condition of his accepting the premiership of Italy from the king. Cadorna was replaced by Armando Diaz. The conference also agreed to the formation of a Supreme War Council at Versailles to co-ordinate allied plans and actions.

At Peschiera, the prime ministers were joined by King Victor Emmanuel III, Sidney Sonnino, Leonida Bissolati, Henry Franklin-Bouillon and Jan Smuts. The king defended Italy's decision to defend the Piave rather than the Mincio, but the Italians were forced to accept British and French freedom of action in Italy.

== Sources ==
- Lloyd George, David, War Memoirs of David Lloyd George, Vol IV, Boston: Little, Brown, 1934
- Edmonds, Sir James E, History of the Great War, Vol VIII, Military Operations, the March Offensive, 1918, London: MacMillan, 1935
