= Sophia Smith Collection =

Women's history archives at Smith College

The Sophia Smith Collection at Smith College is an internationally recognized repository of manuscripts, photographs, periodicals and other primary sources in women's history.

== General ==
One of the largest recognized repositories of manuscripts, archives, photographs, periodicals and other primary sources of women's history, the collection consists of over 10,000 feet (3,000 m) of material documenting the historical experience of women in the United States and abroad from the colonial era to the present. The Sophia Smith Collection shares facilities with the Smith College Archives on the college's campus in Northampton, Massachusetts.

Subject strengths include birth control and reproductive rights, women's rights, suffrage, the contemporary women's movement, U.S. women working abroad, the arts (especially theatre), the professions (especially journalism and social work), and middle-class family life in nineteenth- and twentieth-century New England. Many of these collections are rich sources of visual, as well as manuscript and printed material.

Open to the public free of charge, the collection does not circulate but is available to everyone, can be visited online, or requested as photocopies.

== History ==
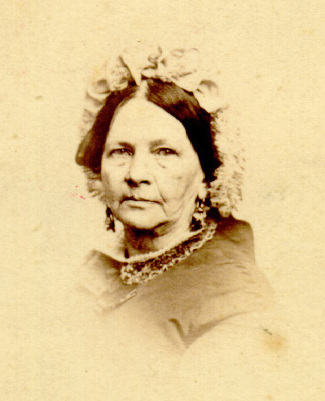
Sophia Smith

The collection was established by Margaret Storrs Grierson in 1942 to serve as the library's distinctive contribution to the college's mission of educating women. The collection was later named after the founder of Smith College, Sophia Smith, who upon her death in 1870 willed her fortune of $387,468 (approximately $7,000,000.00 in the current market) to endow Smith College.

In 1941, Smith College President Herbert Davis proposed the Friends of the Smith College Library that they take on as a special project a collection devoted to works of women writers. Smith College Archivist Margaret Storrs Grierson was appointed Executive Secretary of the Friends of the Smith College Library and Director of the Women's Collection in 1942.

According to Grierson, President Davis was "not clear in his own mind" about what he wanted. Women's rights activist, historian, and archivist Mary Ritter Beard, "rather hoped that [Smith] would be interested in carrying on the work of the recently abandoned Women's Archives [World Center for Women's Archives (WCWA)]," which she had founded in 1935. Within the first year the scope of donations, coupled with Beard's influence, mandated that the project be redefined as a "special historical collection of women's materials, recording women's interests and activities in the course of human history and across the face of the earth".

The donations, many from interested Smith alumnae, were indicative of a growing consensus of what the new collection should be:

"... Such a collection would be primarily if historical value, almost surely offering...fresh material from which to rewrite the pages if our country's history.... The primary concern if gathering material on American women from colonial days onward should not, however, lead to the rejection [ij] material on women if other nations... .Among the Friends if the Smith College Library, many are especially eager. .. that the collection should be... differently formulated and would, I am sure, be if lively assistance in the plan.... This is the sort if collection which will gather impetus as it grows. I believe that we have good opportunity to develop a collection which... may be distinguished.... "

As the collection grew, so did the proportion of manuscript to published materials and its recognition by a national community of scholars. Margaret Grierson explained her role in shaping the Collection's development in these early years:

"President Davis did toss the idea if a collection if the writings if literary women, and I have been busy for years redefining the thing to make sense if it. In the process, I have more or less quietly won the approval and support and clarification if many intelligent alumnae and non-Smith women....I am the only one on campus who knows the women's field at all, and I have met only with support from he president although I have gone slowly, perhaps a little deviously, relying on accomplished fact to argue for me....In any case, I think you will understand how I came to go ahead... if the comprehension if those whose plan it is supposed to be. I am convinced that it is so sound and valuable an enterprise that it must be developed as fast as possible...."

Collection development grew rapidly during those early years although as of 1946 the collection still lacked a name. According to Grierson, "the name of Smith College's founder was not used for other purposes,... and it seemed fitting to adopt the name of the woman who had founded the college to provide women with an education equivalent (not equal) to that offered men, for the collection which was to provide a better knowledge of the accomplishments of women through the ages.... ". The Women's Collection became known as the Sophia Smith Collection shortly thereafter.

== Collections ==
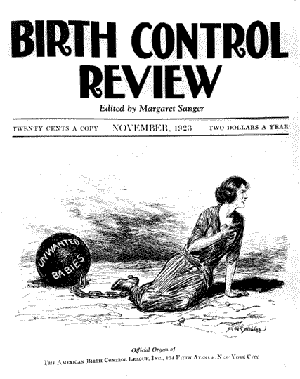
Copy of Birth Control Review, edited by Margaret Sanger, in the collection

The Sophia Smith Collection includes over 650 collections (over 10,000 linear feet) of personal and professional papers of individuals and families, organization records, subject collections, oral histories, periodicals, photographs, and audiovisual materials.

=== Personal and Family Papers ===
The Personal and Family Papers contain letters, diaries, scrapbooks, and photographs. The most widely used collections include those of birth control crusader Margaret Sanger; Ellen Gates Starr, co-founder with Jane Addams of the Chicago settlement, Hull House; Mary van Kleeck, social researcher and reformer; the Garrison, Hale, and Ames families; political activist Dorothy Kenyon; the papers of author and activist Gloria Steinem; and lesbian feminist and architect Phyllis Birkby.

=== Records of Organizations ===
Records of Organizations include the minutes, correspondence, reports, publications and related materials documenting the activities of more than sixty organizations focused on women's issues, like Planned Parenthood Federation of America; the National Congress of Neighborhood Women; and the National Board of the YWCA.

=== Subject Collections ===
Subject collections include materials on African American Women, Artists, the Contemporary Women's Movement, Diaries, Autobiographies, family papers, Journalism, Labor, Women in Medicine, Reproductive Rights and Women's Health, Social Work, and the Suffrage Movement.

=== Oral Histories ===
Oral Histories, from both individual and within collections of personal papers, cover topics such as women in the birth control movement, social work, suffrage movement, Italian immigrants, African American women, and American women in the Vietnam War. These projects, sponsored by Smith or other institutions, include interviews on audiotapes, CD-ROM, videotapes, DVDS, and/or typed transcripts, some of which are accompanied by small amounts of biographical materials, photographs, or project records. The Old Lesbian Oral Herstory Project, founded by Arden Eversmeyer in 1999, is archived as part of the Sophia Smith Collection. Voices of Feminism Oral History Project (1990–2006), is archived as part of the Sophia Smith Collection.

=== The SSC Periodicals Collection ===
The SSC Periodicals Collection includes over 1,000 titles of current and historical women's magazines, newspapers, newsletters, and other serials, and 50 current subscriptions. Its holdings represent periodicals such as Godey's Lady's Book (1830–1889), Woman's Journal (1870–1916), Lucifer the Lightbearer (1897–1901), Eugenesia (Mexico, 1943–45), Church Woman (1943–49), and Black Sash (South Africa, 1956–72), as well as early women's liberation periodicals Shrew, Rat, and Velvet Fist.

=== The Girl Zines Collection ===
The Girl Zines Collection consists of 9 linear feet (18 boxes) of small, self-published magazines (known as "zines") created primarily by young women and girls. The collection is primarily made up of individual issues, mostly dating from the 1990s, and they share a strong feminist perspective.
