= Lucius Seymour Storrs =

American geologist and railway official (1869–1945)

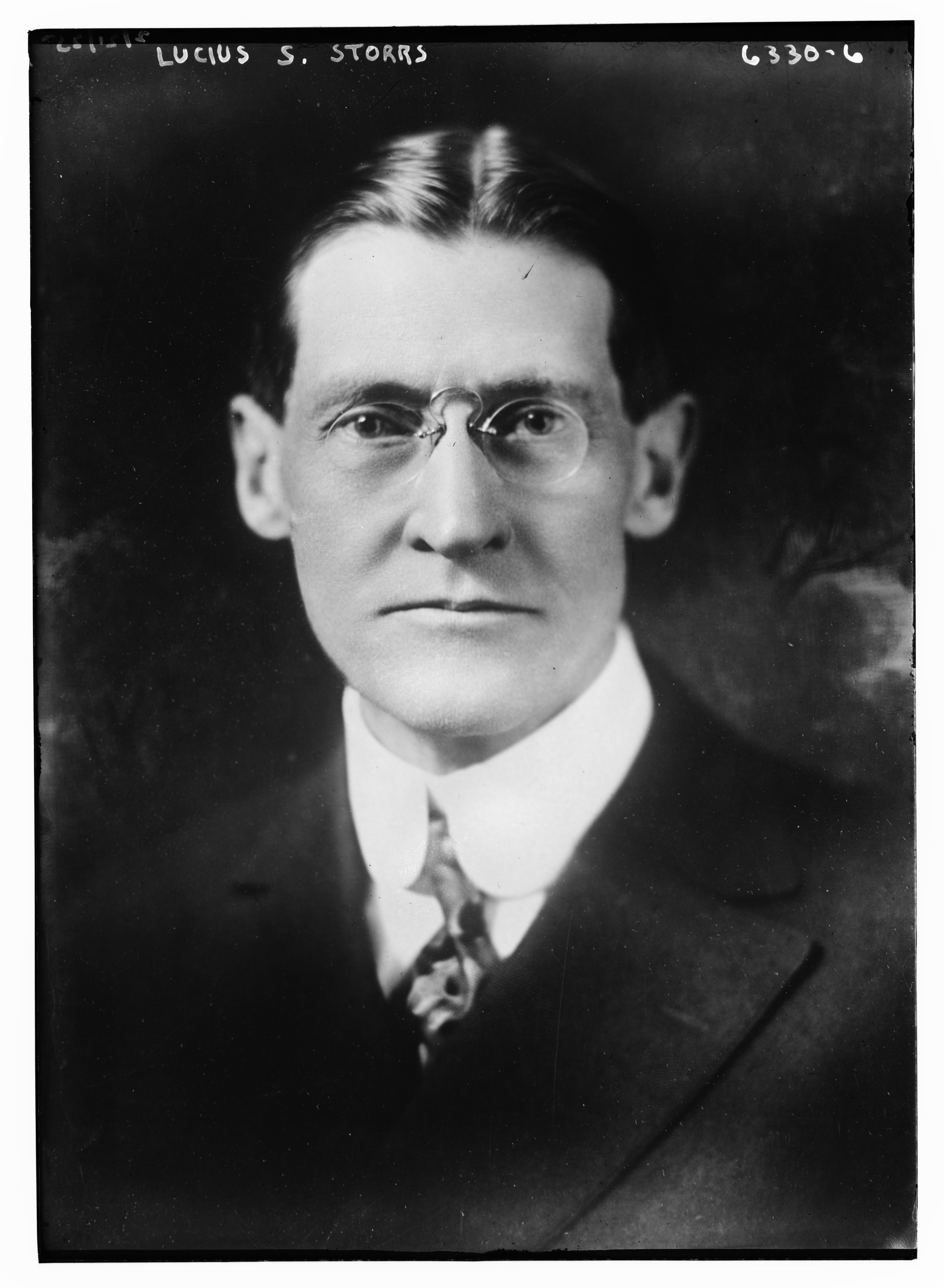
- Storrs in 1900
- Born: January 4, 1869; Buffalo, New York
- Died: July 4, 1945 (aged 76); Northampton, Massachusetts
- Education: University of Nebraska
- Occupation: Railway official
- Known for: Engineer, financier, and railway official
- Board member of: Union Trust Company
- Spouse: Mary Louisa Cooper
- Children: Margaret Storrs Grierson; Lucius ("Luke") Seymour Storrs, Jr.
- Parent(s): Origen (or Origon) Seymour Storrs; Janet (Rankin) Storrs
- Relatives: Job Adams Cooper, father-in-law; Henry Randolph Storrs; William L. Storrs

Lucius Seymour Storrs (January 4, 1869–July 4, 1945) was a geologist, financier, and notable railway official. He was president of the Connecticut Company, the American Electric Railway Association, the Los Angeles Railway Association, and the New England Investment and Security Company.

== Personal life ==
Storrs was born in Buffalo, New York, USA, to Janet (Rankin) Storrs and Origen (or Origon) Seymour Storrs, 1st Sgt. in the Cortland County, New York Civil War 12th Regiment. His paternal grandparents, of English descent, were Lucius (born 1789) and Suzanne Storrs of Mansfield, Connecticut. He is the great-grandson of Dan Storrs (1748–1831), a selectman in Mansfield and a quartermaster of the Connecticut Militia, and Ruth Connant Storrs (1749–1792). His maternal grandparents, of Scottish descent, were Joseph and Janet Rankin.

On June 26, 1894, Storrs married Mary Louisa Cooper (born April 9, 1871, Greenville, Illinois). She was the daughter of Job Adams Cooper, sixth Governor of the State of Colorado. They had two children, a daughter, Margaret Storrs Grierson (born 1900), and a son, Lucius ("Luke") Seymour Storrs, Jr. (born 1910). Storr's job took the family to various parts of the country. From 1900 to 1907, they lived in Denver, Colorado and Bozeman, Montana. In early 1907, they moved to Boston, Massachusetts, then to Brookline, Massachusetts in July 1907, and Springfield, Massachusetts in October 1908. They moved to New Haven, Connecticut in 1911 and stayed for several years, making their home at 121 Whitney Avenue, and Storrs maintained an office at 129 Church Street.

Storrs is a relative of Henry Randolph Storrs, a U.S. Representative from New York; and William L. Storrs, a U.S. Representative from Connecticut. The family name is attributed to Storrs, Connecticut, a community in Mansfield, Connecticut.

== Education ==
Storrs graduated from the University of Nebraska in 1890 with a Bachelor of Science degree, in 1904 with a Master of Arts degree, and in 1927, he earned a doctorate in engineering.

== Career ==
During the period of 1890 to 1894, Storrs worked as an assistant geologist for the Colorado Fuel and Iron Company, and as a geologist for the Northern Pacific Railroad. From 1896 through 1906, he served as a special writer for the U.S. Geological Survey. Storrs surveyed several counties in Montana, including Carbon, Gallatin, and Madison. From 1912 to 1914, he was vice-president of New York, New Haven and Hartford Railroad; he was also vice-president of Berkshire Street Railway Company. In 1914, he became president of the Connecticut Company, and eventually was also president of the New England Investment and Security Company. He served as a director of the Union Trust Company, located in Springfield, Massachusetts.

He belonged to several associations, including: American Association for the Advancement of Science, American Institute of Mining Engineers, and Sigma Xi.

== Later years ==
After retiring, Storrs became chairman for the national defense committee of the American Electric Railway Association.

Grierson, on faculty at Smith College, lived in Northampton, Massachusetts, from the mid-1930s and it was in Northampton that Storrs died in 1945. He belonged to the Congregational Church.

== Legacy ==
In 1984, Grierson, a notable archivist, donated her father's geological papers pertaining to his work in Minnesota, Montana, North Dakota, and Washington to Merrill G. Burlingame Special Collections at the University of Montana. The balance of his papers were donated to the University of Nebraska. His awards and family papers are held in a collection at Smith College:

- Medal, Sons of the American Revolution
- 1917, Badge, American Electric Railway Association, L. S. Storrs, President
- 1919, Certificate, United States Council of National Defense
- 1922, Certificate, Society of Colonial Wars in the State of Connecticut
- 1924, Delegate Badge and Ribbon, Connecticut Delegation to the Republican Convention, Cleveland
- 1939, Badge and Ribbon, Union Station Celebration, L. S. Storrs, Executive Committee
