= Smith College Archives =

Archives of college in Northampton, Massachusetts

Coordinates: 42.3171334°N 72.6385327°W

Smith College is a private, independent women's liberal arts college with coed graduate and certificate programs, located in Northampton, Massachusetts, United States. The Smith College Archives document the life of the College by collecting materials created by students, faculty, administrative and departmental staff during the course of their time here. The records in the College Archives can provide researchers with answers to specific questions or help them to understand broad social and cultural issues. The collections contain materials derived from:

- administrative records
- biographical records
- academic life
- student life
- buildings and grounds
- audiovisual materials

The collection spans nearly 20,000 linear feet and is one of the contributing collections to "The History of Women’s Education Open Access Portal Project" funded through the National Endowment for the Humanities.

== History ==
=== Nina Browne ===
Of the class of 1882, Nina Browne's career as an archivist began in 1921, when she was hired by Smith College as its first archivist of the Smith College Archives. Browne had been active in the Alumna Association, and material from her time as a student (saved by her mother) formed the basis of the early collection. Though she was initially hired with an eye to the college's 50th anniversary in 1925, she remained in her position long after the event. She became partially blind, which set her retirement in motion in 1937. Browne remained a strong advocate for the archive, asserting its importance and the need for a physical space for the collection. Margaret Storrs Grierson stepped into the role of college archivist in 1940.

=== Elizabeth Cutter Morrow ===
Supporting the work Browne had begun, Elizabeth Cutter Morrow officially established the Archives of Smith College in March, 1940. As acting-president of Smith College, Mrs. Morrow advocated that "several institutions of higher learning, Amherst and Harvard [to mention only two] had set aside space and provided personnel not only for the preservation of documents related to the early history of the institution but also to preserve material which had reference to its development through successive periods, including the present, and included material connected with administrators, faculty members, and students."

=== Margaret Storrs Grierson ===
In 1940, Mrs. Morrow appointed Margaret Storrs Grierson to the professional position of Archivist.

== Present ==
Today the College Archives are actively used by researchers and incorporated into dozens of curricula. The College Archivist also serves as the institutional records manager and serves in an advisory role to administrative departments across campus.

== Additional materials ==
- "Archives Are College History", Daily Hampshire Gazette (May 1960)
- "Smith Archives Are A Treasure", Daily Hampshire Gazette (September 3, 1974)
- "Archives Mix Past And Present", The Sophian (October 23, 1975
- RG10.09 History: College Archives and SSC
- "WMass Archivists Provide Peepholes To Past", The Sunday Republican (MArch 24,1985)
- Smith College Archives Concentration
- Women's Collections Roundtable, Society of American Archivists
- Grierson, Margaret Storrs (October 1943). "Woman's Collection", report written for Friends of the Smith College Library member Frances Carpenter Huntington. History of the Sophia Smith Collection, College Archives.
- Murdock, M.E. "Exploring Women's Lives:Historical and contemporary resources in the college archives and the Sophia Smith Collection at Smith College Special Collections".
- Lavender Legacies Guide, Society of American Archivists Lavender Legacies Guide, Society of American Archivists, Society of American Archivists
- Seventy-Five Years of International Women’s Collecting: Legacies, Successes, Obstacles, and New Directions, American Archivist
