= Storrs =

Storrs may refer to:

- Storrs (surname)
- Storrs, Connecticut, a village where the main campus of the University of Connecticut is located
  - Charles and Augustus Storrs, founders of the University of Connecticut and namesakes of the village
- Storrs Township, Hamilton County, Ohio
- Storrs, South Yorkshire, a rural hamlet within the City of Sheffield, England
- Storrs, Cumbria

== See also ==
- Storrs Hall, a listed building in Cumbria, England
- Yealand Storrs, a hamlet in the English county of Lancashire
- Storr
