= Margaret Storrs Grierson =

American archivist and philosophy professor

- Grierson in 1946
- Born: Margaret Storrs; June 29, 1900; Denver, Colorado, US
- Died: December 12, 1997; Leeds, Massachusetts, US
- Education: A.B., Smith College; Ph.D., Bryn Mawr College
- Occupations: Philosophy professor; college archivist
- Years active: 1930–1965
- Employer: Smith College
- Known for: Founder and first director of the Sophia Smith Collection at Smith College
- Spouse: Sir Herbert Grierson
- Parent(s): Lucius Seymour Storrs, father
- Relatives: Job Adams Cooper, maternal grandfather

I was around only for the beginning; for the planting of an acorn. The greatest satisfaction is to see it go on developing, growing in ways beyond my ken, into a staunch oak tree.

— Margaret Storrs Grierson referencing the Sophia Smith Collection at Smith College

Margaret Storrs Grierson (June 29, 1900 – December 12, 1997) was an American archivist, philosophy professor, and the founder and first director of the Sophia Smith Collection at Smith College. In this capacity, she traveled extensively, in the United States and abroad, assembling manuscripts that document the history of women.

== Early life and education ==
Margaret Storrs was born in Denver, Colorado. Her father was railway executive Lucius Seymour Storrs and her mother was Mary Cooper Storrs, daughter of Job Adams Cooper, sixth Governor of the State of Colorado. Grierson had one sibling, a brother, Lucius ("Luke") Seymour Storrs, Jr.

Because of her father's career, the family moved several times during Grierson's childhood. She attended seven schools before entering Misses Masters' School, Dobbs Ferry, New York.

In 1918, Grierson began her undergraduate study at Smith College. She graduated in 1922 with a degree in English. She then did graduate work at Bryn Mawr, receiving a Ph.D. in philosophy in 1930. From 1924 to 1925 she studied at University College of the University of London.

== Career ==
Grierson taught philosophy at Smith College from 1930 to 1936. In 1940, she became the college archivist, and in 1942, she also became the executive secretary of the Friends of the Smith College Library. In 1942, she became the first director of the Sophia Smith Collection at the college. Until her retirement in 1965, Grierson simultaneously held the three positions.

After her retirement, Grierson shifted her attention to family ancestry, focusing on the Cooper, Rankin, and Barnes families.

== Personal life ==
During her professional years at Smith, Grierson developed an enduring friendship with professor Marine Leland that lasted until Leland's death in 1983. In the mid 1930s the two women purchased a home together at 66 Massasoit Street in Northampton. They shared the home even after Grierson's marriage on December 7, 1938.

Grierson's husband was Sir Herbert Grierson, Rector of the University of Edinburgh. She married him in Edinburgh, Scotland. They returned to Northampton in February 1939. Sir Herbert died in February 1960.

In the early 1990s, Grierson sold the home she had shared with Leland and moved to an apartment on Crescent Street.

== Death and legacy ==
Grierson died of cancer on December 12, 1997 in Leeds, Massachusetts.

The Grierson Scholars program was launched in the late 1990s, partially funded by the National Endowment for the Humanities.

== Awards and honors ==
She was awarded the Smith College Medal in 1968.
