= Job Adams Cooper =

American politician (1843–1899)

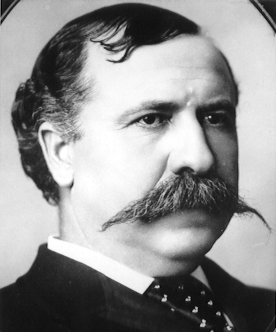

6th Governor of Colorado
- In office January 8, 1889 – January 13, 1891
- Lieutenant: William Grover Smith
- Preceded by: Alva Adams
- Succeeded by: John L. Routt

Personal details
- Born: November 6, 1843 Greenville, Illinois
- Died: January 20, 1899 (aged 55)
- Party: Republican
- Spouse: Jane Olivia Barnes Cooper (m.1867)
- Children: 4

Job Adams Cooper (November 6, 1843 – January 20, 1899) was a U.S. Republican Party politician. He served as the sixth governor of the State of Colorado from 1889 to 1891.

== Early life ==
Job Adams Cooper was born in Greenville, Illinois, to Charles and Maria Hadley Cooper, one of seven children. He attended Knox College in Galesburg, Illinois, but took a leave of absence to fight in the American Civil War for the Union Army.

Cooper enlisted as a sergeant in the 137th Illinois Volunteer Infantry, and was stationed in Memphis, Tennessee, during the Confederate raid on the city by troopers under the command of General Nathan Bedford Forrest. Following the war, he returned to complete his studies. Upon graduation from Knox College in 1867, he returned to his hometown of Greenville and was admitted to practice law in Illinois.

That same year, Cooper married Jane O. Barnes, the daughter of a prominent minister, and they had four children together. Leaving his family behind in 1872, he accompanied A. C. Phelps on a westward journey hoping to find entrepreneurial opportunities, and eventually settled in Denver, Colorado, where they started the law firm of Phelps and Cooper. In between 1872 and 1888, Cooper expanded his business interests to include insurance, banking, mining, and the cattle industry.

== Governor of Colorado ==
In 1888, Cooper was nominated for Governor, and went on to defeat Rocky Mountain News editor Thomas M. Patterson in the general election. Following his inauguration as the state's sixth Governor in January, 1889, he signed legislation that created thirteen new counties, including: Baca, Cheyenne, Kiowa, Kit Carson, Lincoln, Montezuma, Morgan, Otero, Phillips, Prowers, Rio Blanco, Sedgwick, and Yuma. Furthermore, he opened a state orphans home in Denver and a state reformatory in Chaffee County.

== Retirement ==
Cooper declined to seek reelection in 1890, and returned to his law practice. He later formed a construction business and built Denver's Cooper Building. From 1893 to 1897, he served as president of the local chamber of commerce. He died at the age of 55 and is buried in Denver's Fairmount Cemetery.

== Family life ==
Cooper had a daughter, Mary Louisa Cooper, wife of geologist and railroad official, Lucius Seymour Storrs. The Storrs had two children, Lucius Seymour Storrs Jr., and Margaret Storrs Grierson.

Party political offices
Preceded by William H. Meyer	Republican nominee for Governor of Colorado; 1888	Succeeded by John Long Routt
Political offices
Preceded by Alva Adams	Governor of Colorado; 1889–1891	Succeeded by John Long Routt
