= Union Trust Company Building (Springfield, Massachusetts) =

- U.S. National Register of Historic Places
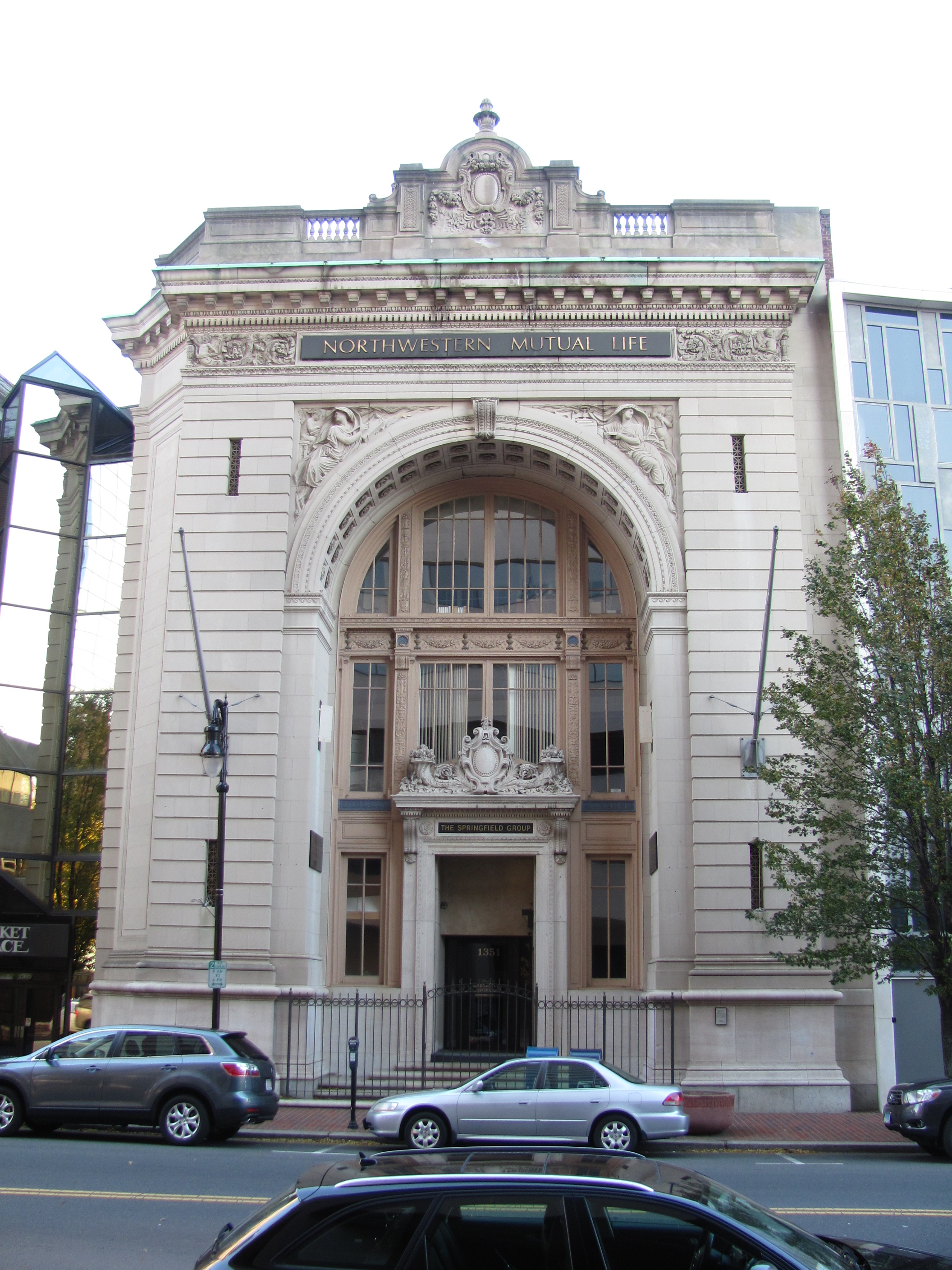
- Union Trust Company Building

- Location within Massachusetts Location within the United States
- Location: Springfield, Massachusetts
- Coordinates: 42°6′8″N 72°35′22″W
- Area: less than one acre
- Built: 1907
- Architect: Peabody & Stearns; Evans, John
- Architectural style: Beaux Arts
- NRHP reference No.: 78000448
- Added to NRHP: January 9, 1978

The Union Trust Company Building is a historic bank building at 1351 Main Street in Springfield, Massachusetts. Built in 1907, it is one of the city's best examples of Beaux arts architecture, and one of only a few designs in the city by the noted architectural firm Peabody & Stearns. It is particularly noted for its facade, which resembles a triumphal arch. The building was listed on the National Register of Historic Places in 1978.

== Description and history ==
The Union Trust Company Building is located in downtown Springfield, on the east side of Main Street between Harrison Avenue and Bruce Landon Way. It is a two-story masonry structure, with a limestone facade and marble-faced foundation. The front of the building was designed to resemble a triumphal arch, with the entrance recessed from massive piers supporting a rounded arch, and topped by a large decorated cornice and parapet. The inside face of the arch is decorated with rosettes, and the spandrels are filled by Classical carvings executed by John Evans. The entrance is topped by a bracketed cornice that is surmounted by a cartouche with flanking baskets.

The Union Trust Company was founded in 1906 by the merger of three city banks, including its oldest, the Springfield Bank (founded 1814). This building served as the headquarters of that bank and its successors until 1970. It is one of a handful of works in the Pioneer Valley of Massachusetts that were designed by the nationally prominent Boston architectural firm Peabody & Stearns. It was listed in 1978.

== See also ==
- Court Square Historic District (Springfield, Massachusetts), across the street
- National Register of Historic Places listings in Springfield, Massachusetts
- National Register of Historic Places listings in Hampden County, Massachusetts
