= Antony Storrs =

Canadian Navy officer (1907–2002)

Rear-Admiral Antony Hubert Gleadow Storrs, DSC*, CD (1907–2002) was a Royal Canadian Navy officer. He led the 31st Minesweeping Flotilla as part of Operation Nepture, sweeping the approach to Omaha Beach.
