= X Committee =

The X Committee was established during World War I by Lord Alfred Milner as a way of managing and providing strategic direction to the Great War. Its members included Prime Minister Lloyd George, Lord Milner, General Henry Wilson, and Maurice Hankey as its Secretary. Hankey delegated his responsibility to Leo Amery. Meetings were held at 10 Downing Street, sometimes once, sometimes twice daily. Amery says the X Committee "really ran the war during the critical spring and summer months" of 1918. The X Committee's first meeting was held on 15 May 1918, and its last meeting on 25 November 1918. From a biography written about his father, the son of Jan Smuts revealed that the words "X Committee" stood for "Executive Committee", and that Lord Milner must have learned about it during his time in South Africa (1897–1905).

== Sources ==
- Marlowe, John (a pseudonym) (1976). "Milner: Apostle of Empire". London: Hamish Hamilton. ISBN 978-0-241-89433-0.
- Amery, Leo (1953). "My Political Life, Volume II, War and Peace 1914–1929". London: Hutchinson.
- UK National Archives, X Committee Minutes
