= Lancelot Storr =

British army officer (1874–1944)

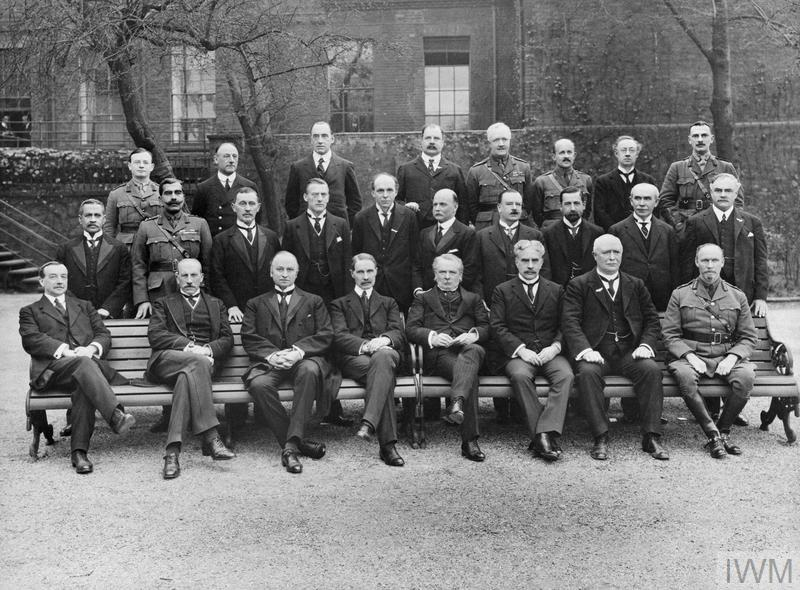
Imperial War Cabinet (1917). Top Row: Leopold Amery (far left), Lancelot Storr (far right), and Maurice Hankey (third from the right)

Sir Lancelot Storr (18 January 1874 – 7 August 1944) was a British Army officer and an assistant war cabinet secretary during World War I.

Born in Kent, he was the son of the Rev. Charles Storr. He was educated at the Harrow School, and graduated from the Royal Military College, Sandhurst. In 1905, he married Josephine Dickinson.

He began his military career with the Dorsetshire Regiment in 1893, but then went to India in 1894, serving with the 54th Sikhs (Frontier Force). He participated in the Tirah campaign. He served on the personal staff of Lord Kitchener at the War Office (1914-1916), and as a secretary on the Committee of Imperial Defence (1916-1921). With Kitchener's help, Storr was transferred to the staff of Sir Maurice Hankey at the end of 1916, as part of the reforms promised by Prime Minister David Lloyd George. Working on Hankey's staff, he served as assistant secretary to the British War Cabinet (1916), the Imperial War Cabinet (1917-1918), and the British Section of the Supreme War Council at Versailles (1917-1918) during World War I. Along with Hankey and assistant war cabinet secretary Leo Amery, Storr is prominently featured in the Imperial War Cabinet photograph of 1917. He also participated in the San Remo conference in 1920. He was knighted and retired from the Army in 1921.
