= Louis de La Panouse =

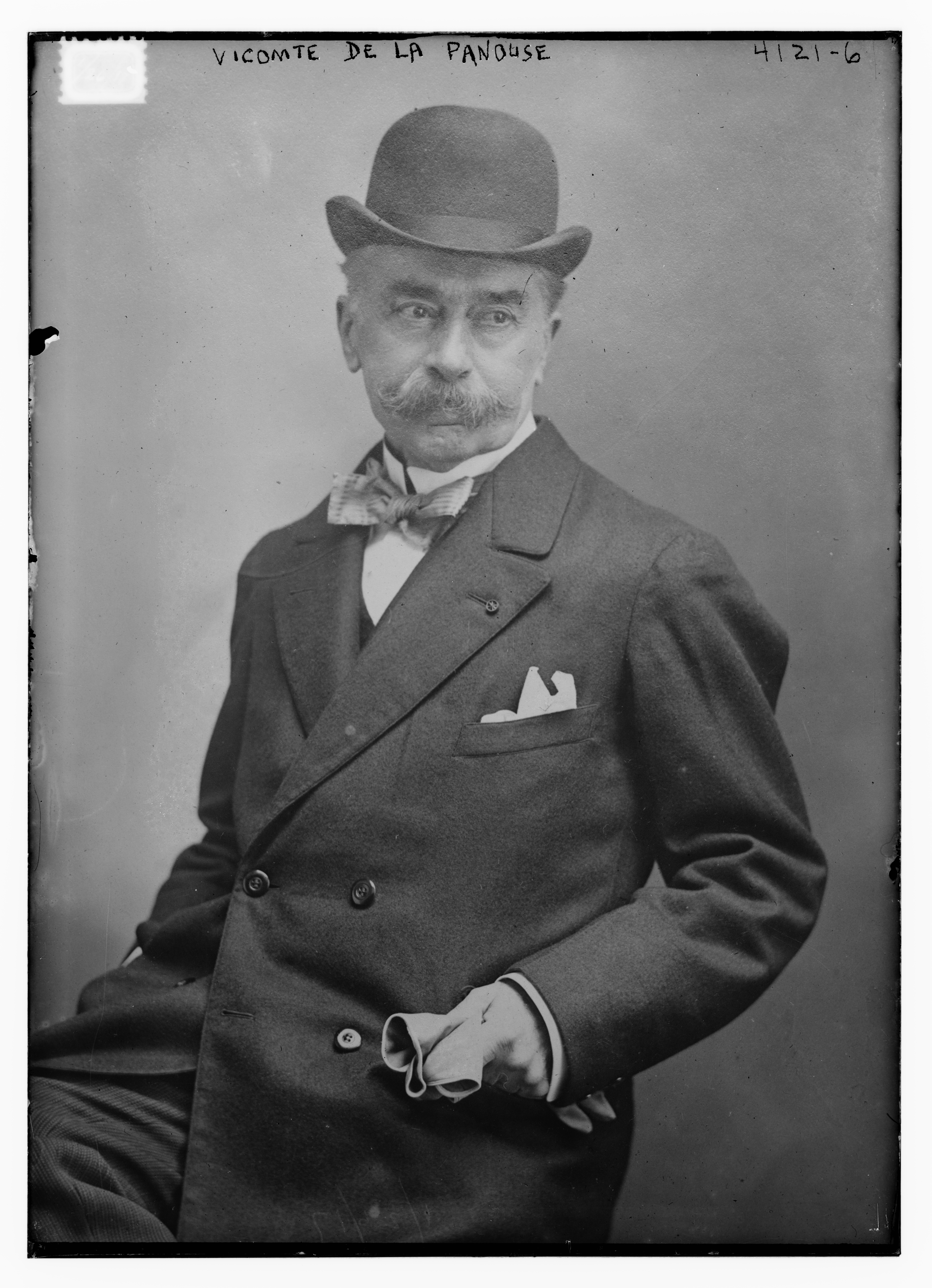
Vicomte de la Panouse in 1916

Artus Henri Louis de la Panouse (19 September 1863, Paris – April 1944) was the President of the International Sporting Club of Monte Carlo. In 1916 he proposed to form a baseball league in southern France. He was a Colonel in the cavalry, later promoted to the rank of General de Brigade, and served as the Military Attaché to the French Embassy in London during World War One.
