= John French, 1st Earl of Ypres =

British Army general (1852–1925)

Field Marshal The Right Honourable The Earl of Ypres KP GCB OM GCVO KCMG PC PC (Ire)
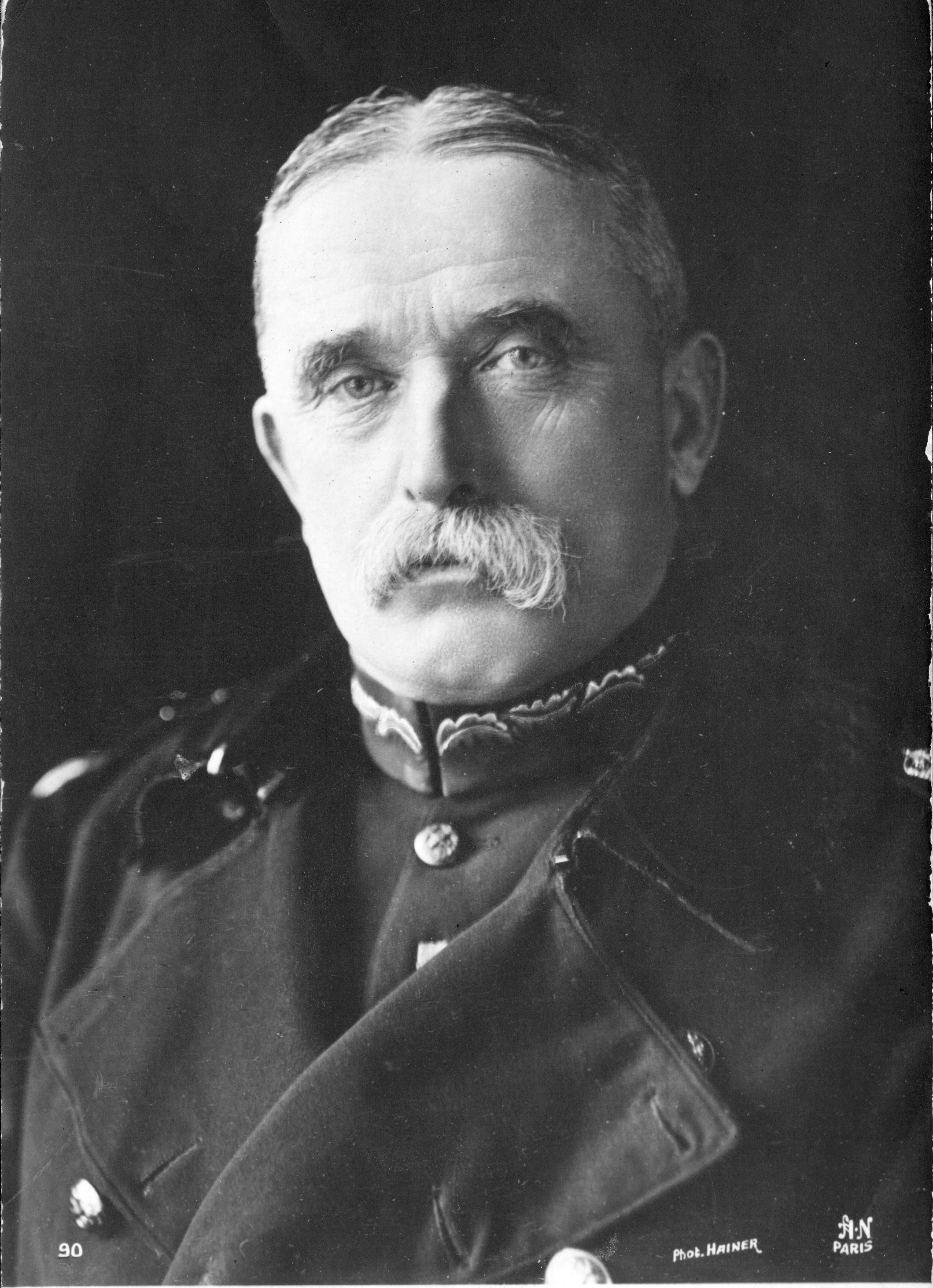

Lord Lieutenant of Ireland
- In office 9 May 1918 – 27 April 1921
- Monarch: George V
- Prime Minister: David Lloyd George
- Preceded by: The Viscount Wimborne
- Succeeded by: The Viscount FitzAlan of Derwent

Personal details
- Born: 28 September 1852 Ripple, Kent, England
- Died: 22 May 1925 (aged 72) Deal, Kent, England
- Resting place: Ripple, Kent
- Spouse(s): Isabella Soundy and Eleanora Selby-Lowndes
- Relations: Charlotte Despard (sister); Katherine Harley (sister)
- Children: John; Gerald

Military service
- Allegiance: United Kingdom
- Branch/service: Royal Navy (1866–1870); British Army (1870–1921)
- Years of service: 1866–1921
- Rank: Field Marshal
- Unit: 8th King's Royal Irish Hussars; 19th Royal Hussars
- Commands: Commander-in-Chief, Home Forces; British Expeditionary Force; Chief of the Imperial General Staff; Aldershot Command; 1st Army Corps
- Battles/wars: Mahdist War; Second Boer War; First World War; Irish War of Independence
- Awards: Knight of the Order of St Patrick; Knight Grand Cross of the Order of the Bath; Member of the Order of Merit; Knight Grand Cross of the Royal Victorian Order; Knight Commander of the Order of St Michael and St George

Field Marshal John Denton Pinkstone French, 1st Earl of Ypres (28 September 1852 – 22 May 1925), known as Sir John French from 1901 to 1916, and as the Viscount French between 1916 and 1922, was a senior British Army officer.

Born in Kent, he saw brief service as a midshipman in the Royal Navy, before becoming a cavalry officer. He achieved rapid promotion and distinguished himself on the Gordon Relief Expedition. He became a national hero during the Second Boer War. He commanded I Corps at Aldershot, then served as Inspector-General of the Forces, before becoming Chief of the Imperial General Staff (CIGS, the professional head of the British Army) in 1912. He helped to prepare the British Army for a possible European war, and was among those who insisted that cavalry still be trained to charge with sabre and lance. During the Curragh incident he had to resign as CIGS.

French's most important role was as Commander-in-Chief of the British Expeditionary Force (BEF) for the first year and a half of the First World War. After the British suffered heavy casualties at the battles of Mons and Le Cateau, French wanted to withdraw the BEF from the Allied line to refit and only agreed to take part in the First Battle of the Marne after a private meeting with the Secretary of State for War, Lord Kitchener, against whom he bore a grudge thereafter. In May 1915 he leaked information about shell shortages to the press in the hope of engineering Kitchener's removal. By summer 1915 French's command was being increasingly criticised in London by Kitchener and other members of the government, and by Douglas Haig, William Robertson and other senior generals in France. After the Battle of Loos, at which French's slow release of XI Corps from reserve was blamed for the failure to achieve a decisive breakthrough on the first day, Prime Minister H. H. Asquith demanded his resignation.

French was appointed Commander-in-Chief, Home Forces for 1916–1918. He then became Lord Lieutenant of Ireland in 1918, a position he held through much of the Irish War of Independence (1919–1922). During this time he published 1914, an inaccurate and much criticised volume of memoirs.

== Early life and career ==
=== Family ===
French's family was related to the French/De Freyne family which had gone to present-day County Wexford in the fourteenth century and had substantial estates at Frenchpark, County Roscommon. French always regarded himself as "Irish", although his branch of the family had lived in England since the eighteenth century.

His father was Royal Navy Commander John Tracey William French. His mother was Margaret Eccles, from Glasgow, who after suffering a breakdown following her husband's death was eventually institutionalised. She died in 1867 leaving French to be brought up by his sisters. He was educated at a Harrow preparatory school and Eastman's Royal Naval Academy before joining the Royal Navy in 1866.

=== Royal Navy ===
He joined the Royal Navy because it gave him a chance to leave home four or five years earlier than the Army. From August 1866 he trained on board the battleship HMS Britannia. He obtained only an "average" certificate which required him to do a further six months of training on board the frigate HMS Bristol from January 1868 before qualifying as a midshipman.

In 1869 he served as a midshipman on HMS Warrior commanded by Captain Boys, an old friend of French's father. She patrolled in the English Channel and off Spain and Portugal. During his service he witnessed the accidental sinking of HMS Captain. He resigned from the Royal Navy in November 1870 as he was discovered to be acrophobic and to suffer from seasickness.

=== Early army career ===
French joined the Suffolk Artillery Militia in November 1870 where he was expected to put in about two months a year with the regiment. He initially failed his exams (mathematics and foreign languages) for a regular commission. He was commissioned as a lieutenant in the 8th King's Royal Irish Hussars on 28 February 1874, but there is no evidence that he ever served with them.

He transferred to the 19th Hussars on 11 March 1874 possibly as it was less expensive—following the sale of the family home at Ripple Valley French's private income of £1,000 per annum was enough to cover the £500–£600 required by his new regiment. He was posted to Aldershot Command. He became an expert hunter and steeplechaser, permanently damaging the little finger of his right hand in a fall. The 19th Hussars were posted to Ireland in June 1876. In September 1877 French was one of two lieutenants who persuaded 70 drunk and mutinous troopers, who had armed themselves with sticks and threatened "murder", to return to barracks. In 1880 the 19th were deployed to Ballinrobe and Lough Mask to protect labourers at the height of the Captain Boycott disturbances. An Irishman hamstrung French's horse with a sickle while he was sitting on it. He became adjutant of his regiment on 1 June 1880. Turnover of officers brought French his promotion to captain on 16 October 1880.

He became adjutant of the Northumberland Hussars on 1 April 1881. While in Northumberland he missed out on active service: the 19th Hussars took part in the occupation of Egypt and Battle of Tel el-Kebir but French's applications to rejoin his regiment were rejected by the War Office. An increase in the number of majors in the 19th Hussars brought French promotion to that rank on 3 April 1883. These promotions (captain at the age of 28, major at 30) were relatively rapid.

=== Sudan ===
French was initially expected to rejoin his regiment when they returned to Ireland, but the emergence of the Mahdi in the Sudan required them to fight Mahdist forces near Suakin. French rejoined the regiment when they returned to Cairo in October 1884.

French took part in the Sudan expedition to relieve Major-General Charles Gordon in 1884. He was second-in-command to his friend Lieutenant Colonel Percy Barrow, with the cavalry which accompanied Brigadier-General Sir Herbert Stewart as he took the short route across 176 miles of desert. Most of the cavalry work was in reconnaissance and warding off Dervish raids, although they did—at a walk—pursue the retreating enemy after the Battle of Abu Klea in January 1885. By the time they reached the Nile the horses had not been watered for between 56 and 72 hours. During the retreat back across the desert via Jakdul (the expedition had reached Khartoum too late to save Gordon) French led a rearguard of thirteen men, warding off Dervish attacks and impressing Redvers Buller and Sir Garnet Wolseley.

He was promoted to lieutenant colonel on 7 February 1885. Once again, this was an unusually early promotion, and he was appointed second-in-command of the 19th Hussars. His experience of handling cavalry with scarce water would stand him in good stead in South Africa. In January 1886 he briefly acted as Commanding Officer when Colonel Barrow died, but French was considered too young for the position, and Colonel Boyce Combe was transferred in.

From June 1886 to April 1888 French was stationed at Norwich with the regiment. He became Commanding Officer of the 19th Hussars on 27 September 1888. He impressed Evelyn Wood by his initiative in organising his regiment into squadrons.

=== India and divorce scandal ===
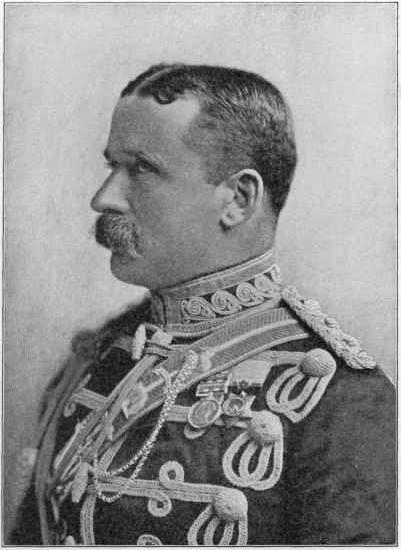
Colonel French in full dress uniform, 1892. This is one of the few photographs of French taken before his appearance aged dramatically, and hinting at his success as a womaniser.

He was promoted brevet colonel (7 February 1889), and was posted to India in September 1891. There, at cavalry camp during an exercise in November 1891, he first met Captain Douglas Haig, with whose career his own was to be entwined for the next 25 years. French became Assistant Adjutant-General of Cavalry in 1893.

In India serving initially at Secunderabad and Bangalore, French worked as a staff officer under Sir George Luck, a noted trainer of cavalry, albeit with perhaps an excessive emphasis on parade-ground drill. French commanded a brigade of Indian Cavalry on manoeuvres near Lahore in January 1893. He seems not to have acquired the deep affection for India common in officers who served there.

French's wife did not accompany him to India (they seem to have lived apart for a while after his return from Egypt). When commanding the 19th Hussars in India, French was cited for adultery with the wife of a brother officer during his leave in the Indian hills; he was lucky this did not terminate his career. There were also unsubstantiated rumours that French had had affairs with the daughter of an Anglo-Indian railway official and also, earlier in his career, with his commanding officer's wife. A later tale, that he had once been the lover of the Irish nationalist Maud Gonne, appeared in Mary Colum's Life and the Dream (1947), although his biographer comments that it "lacks firm evidence".

He was on half-pay in 1893–1895, possibly as a result of the Indian divorce scandal, and reduced to bicycling with his sons as he could not afford to keep horses. According to his son Gerald he would hop alongside the bicycle as he never mastered the art of mounting it.

=== Career saved twice ===
Two years on half pay would normally have meant compulsory retirement but in autumn 1894 he temporarily commanded a cavalry brigade on the manoeuvres in the Vale of the White Horse in Berkshire. French commented that the role of modern cavalry was not to "cut and hack and thrust" but rather to herd the enemy within range of friendly artillery. His handling of the brigade was seen as one of the few successful parts of the manoeuvres. He was appointed Assistant Adjutant-General at Army Headquarters on 24 August 1895, writing a new cavalry training manual (in practice extensively assisted by Captain Douglas Haig).

French went on to be Commander of the 2nd Cavalry Brigade at Canterbury on 1 May 1897 and Commander of the 1st Cavalry Brigade at Aldershot Command on 12 January 1899. Haig, recently returned from the Sudan War, was French's brigade major at Aldershot. French was promoted to temporary major-general early in 1899. There were some accusations that these promotions, for a man whose career had so recently nearly ended, relied too much on powerful patrons. Early in 1899, at his own request, French borrowed £2,500, in a formal contract with interest, from Haig. He was within 24 hours of bankruptcy—which would have required him to resign his commission—after unwise investments in South African mining shares (Transvaal Golds), which crashed in value as war loomed. Richard Holmes believed the loan was never repaid, but Haig's biographer Walter Reid believes that the loan was probably repaid in 1909.

== Boer War ==
=== Early war ===
==== Arrival ====
French embarked from Southampton for the Second Boer War on 23 September 1899, inviting Haig to share his cabin. War had not yet officially been declared: British troops were being sent in the hope of intimidating President Paul Kruger of the Transvaal into granting equal voting rights to the Uitlanders—non-Boer settlers—which would break the Boer stronghold on political power. It had the opposite effect, as the Boers issued their own ultimatum on 9 October, in the hope of provoking an anti-British rising by the Boers of the British-ruled Cape Colony. He was appointed both a major-general on the staff and a local major-general.

French arrived at Cape Town on 11 October. He had expected to command a cavalry brigade under Lieutenant-General George White in Natal, White also had the equivalent of a division of infantry but Colonel Brocklehurst was appointed to this command, while French and Haig were ordered to proceed to Natal "for the present" after receiving a cable from the War Office, which they guessed correctly meant that they were to take charge of the Cavalry Division when Buller's Army Corps arrived. After steaming to Durban French and Haig arrived in Ladysmith at 5:40 am on 20 October, just as hostilities were beginning.

==== Elandslaagte ====
On the morning of his arrival, French was ordered to investigate reports that the Boers had taken Elandslaagte. Taking with him the 5th Lancers, six squadrons of Natal Carbineers and Natal Mounted Rifles, a battery of field artillery and a brigade of infantry under Colonel Ian Hamilton, he made contact with the Boers at 13:00 that day. White was initially cautious but on 21 October, having learned of Symons' victory at Talana the previous day, he permitted French to attack. Concerned at French's lack of experience at commanding infantry, White initially proposed that his chief of staff Maj-Gen Archibald Hunter take command, but Hunter advised that French should be left in command. White himself came merely to observe. French enjoyed numerical superiority of around 3:1.

Elandslaagte saw British cavalry charge with the lance, cutting down fleeing Boers amid gory scenes described by one British officer as "most excellent pig-sticking". This was portrayed as proving the continued relevance of cavalry charges, but in fact owed much to the success of Hamilton's preceding infantry attack and the fact that the charge was carried out at dusk. French celebrated the anniversary of this small battle for the rest of his life and it was seized on by the press in Britain.

That night White ordered all British forces to fall back on Ladysmith, where it was soon clear that they were about to be besieged by the combined Transvaal and Orange Free State forces. French spent much of 26 and 27 October patrolling around the advancing Boer forces. On 30 October his cavalry fought dismounted at Lombard's Kop north-east of Ladysmith; this was the right flank of three unsuccessful actions—the others being Nicholson's Nek and an infantry action at Long Hill in the centre which ended in near-rout—fought by White's troops on "Mournful Monday".

Although French pointed out that cavalry were unlikely to be of much use in a besieged town, White refused him permission to break out. On 2 November, after he had spent the morning on a raid on a Boer laager, French received orders to leave Ladysmith. French and Haig escaped under fire on the last train out as the Boer siege began; Boers tore up the track minutes after the train passed. Steaming from Durban on 3 November, he arrived at Cape Town on 8 November, meeting with Buller, whose Army Corps was then arriving.

==== Colesberg operations ====
French was initially ordered to assemble the Cavalry Division at Maitland, near Cape Town. Now a local lieutenant-general like Buller's other four division commanders, he was then ordered to take command of forces covering the Colesberg area, filling the gap between Methuen's division (operating at Orange River Station, with a view to relieving Kimberley and Mafeking) and Gatacre's division at Stormberg. On 18 November he went up to De Aar, nearer the front, to confer with Maj-Gen Wauchope, in charge of the lines of communication.

French arrived at Naawpoort on the afternoon of 20 November, and personally led a reconnaissance the following morning. The Boer force of General Hendrik Schoeman (Note: Boer General Hendrik Jacobus Schoeman (1840–1901), son of Stephanus Schoeman, State President of the South African Republic (1860–1862)) had been reinforced by local Boers, and French, not strong enough to attack Arundel directly, conducted an active defence. At one stage, in late November and until 14 December, he was also required to extend his forces east to Rosmead to protect the railway to Port Elizabeth. A Boer penetration here would have cut off Cape Colony from Natal. French was proud of having kept the initiative over the Boers despite his force of 2,000 men being outnumbered two to one. French's subordinate Colonel T. C. Porter won a small action near Vaal Kop on 13 December, but the Boers captured that place on 16 December, causing French to go forward and take personal command. Around this time he offered to cancel his plans to advance on Colesberg and lend his cavalry to Methuen, who had been defeated at Magersfontein, but this was rejected as there was insufficient water even for Methuen's own horses in the sector.

Between Field Marshal Frederick Roberts' appointment as Commander-in-Chief on 17 December 1899 (following the defeats of Black Week) and arrival at Cape Town on 10 January, French was the only senior British commander to conduct active operations. Although Schoeman's force had grown further in size, he had lost the confidence of his subordinates and, after a Boer council of war, fell back on a strong position surrounded by hills at Colesberg (29 December) just as French had been preparing to outflank him. French instead (1 January 1900) pinned down the Boer forces and turned their right flank (the British left). The fighting went on until 25 January, with French several times attempting to turn the Boer flanks but pulling back as his forces ran into resistance.

French did not succeed in capturing Colesberg, but he had prevented a Boer invasion of the Cape and tied down Boer forces which might have been used elsewhere. Leo Amery's Times History, highly critical of British generalship during this period, later wrote of his "almost unbroken series of successes", showing grasp of tactics. Cavalry—often fighting dismounted—never made up more than half of his force, and were usually outnumbered three-to-one by Boer cavalry. There were some accusations that French was a glory-hunter.

=== Under Roberts ===
==== Cavalry Division ====
French was one of the few senior officers to be retained by Roberts. Roberts summoned French to Cape Town on 29 January to inquire about expenditure of horses and ammunition around Colesberg. French came away with the impression that he had "only with difficulty persuaded (Roberts and Kitchener) on 29 January to send the Cavalry Division and himself in command of it". French's insecurity was increased by this turn of events—not only did he belong to the wrong faction in the Army—the followers of Wolseley and Buller—now in eclipse, but he had up until now been denied command both of the cavalry brigade in Natal and the Cavalry Division (instead being given ad hoc forces to command in both cases).

French was affectionate about "dear old Bobs" but sometimes took a dim view of his military abilities. He correctly predicted that the centralisation of transport would lead to a collapse in supply arrangements. French disliked William Nicholson, under whose control Roberts had centralised all transport, and retained autonomy for Cavalry Division transport.

Unlike Roberts, French and Haig believed that cavalry should still be trained to charge with steel as well as to fight dismounted with firearms. They appreciated the value of good colonial troops and trained Mounted Infantry, but had already insisted that the New Zealand Mounted Rifles Brigade fix bayonets to their carbines to use as lances, and were sceptical about the Colonial "Skallywag" units which Roberts was raising. Roberts also appointed Charles Hay, 20th Earl of Erroll as Assistant Adjutant-General (AAG) of the Cavalry Division, with Haig, to whom Buller had promised the job, as his deputy—French did his best to bypass Erroll and work through Haig. On 31 January French returned to the Colesberg front to break up his old command, leaving Maj-Gen Ralph Arthur Penrhyn Clements to cover the Colesberg area with a mixed force.

==== March to relieve Kimberley ====
Kitchener ordered French (10 February) "The cavalry must relieve Kimberley at all costs". French promised Roberts that if he were still alive he would be in Kimberley, where the civilian population was urging Colonel Robert Kekewich to surrender, in five days.

French's Cavalry Division consisted of three cavalry brigades and two brigades of mounted infantry, although the latter did not accompany them when they broke camp at 3 am on 11 March—a separate provisional brigade of mounted infantry was provided instead. Roberts gave an inspirational speech to French's brigade and regimental commanders. Rather than cross the Modder River directly (Kimberley lay around 25 miles north-east), they made an envelopment move: first over 20 miles south to Ramdam, then about 15 miles east to seize the Riet River Crossings, then about 25 miles (roughly north-north-east) to Klip Drift on the Modder, then another 20 miles north-west to Kimberley. This was to be accomplished across arid land in five days, with much of the travel by moonlight as it was the middle of summer. French carried only six days' rations for the men and five days' forage for the horses.

The force left Ramdam at 2 am on 12 February, with only 4,000 horsemen rather than the 8,000 he had expected to have, but French felt he had to push on rather than wait for straggling units to catch up (the brigades' staffs were all new, and brigadiers only joined their units in the course of the march). De Kiel's Drift on the Riet was seized by mid afternoon—French ordered his cavalry to gallop for it as soon as he saw the way was clear—but the crossing was soon in what Haig called "an indescribable state of confusion" as Roberts had neglected to order priority for Cavalry Division baggage. Kitchener, arriving in the evening, ordered French to seize Waterval Drift, another crossing a few miles to the northwest where he had left a brigade masking a small Boer force under Christiaan de Wet. Although this was done, the advance could not be resumed until 10:30 am on 13 February, and accompanied by five baggage wagons which had managed to get through the logjam at De Kiel's Drift.

==== Klip Drift ====
French's division moved in line of squadron columns across a five-mile wide front, halting between 12:30 and 1 pm at the well at Blauuwboschpan, where he left a garrison to hold until the infantry arrived. He brushed aside a small Boer force (perhaps 300 men) which attempted to block his path to the Modder River, but concerned that he might be attacked from the east by de Wet's main force, moved quickly at 2 pm to seize the crossings at Rondeval and Klip Drift (he aimed to at least threaten two crossings to avoid the delay which had happened at De Kiel's Drift). By 5 pm he was able to send a galloper to Roberts with the message that he was across the Modder. He had lost only three men wounded, although 40 horses had died of exhaustion and over 500 were incapable of further work. French then had to wait a day while Thomas Kelly-Kenny's 6th Infantry Division made a forced march from the Riet Crossings to the Modder Crossings, during which time Piet Cronje, believing French's advance to be a feint, missed an opportunity to reinforce the area.

Equipped with three days' supplies, French resumed his advance at 9:30 am on 15 February. At Abon's Dam, five miles north of the Modder, French sent his cavalry, supported by the fire of 56 guns, charging up a valley between two Boer held ridges. The charge was led by the 9th and 16th Lancers. The Boer riflemen, perhaps 600 in number, were able to achieve little at ranges of 1,000 yards.

Amery's Times History later wrote "the charge at Klip Drift marks an epoch in the history of cavalry", arguing that French had "divined" that a cavalry charge made with "reckless, dare-devil confidence" could cut through a line of "unseen" enemy infantry who could have resisted a cautious attack by British infantry. The Official History called it "the most brilliant stroke of the war". He was also later praised by the cavalry writer Erskine Childers and by the German history of the campaign, which cited Klip Drift as evidence that cavalry could still charge infantry armed with magazine rifles. These claims were exaggerated. French had attacked a thinly-held part of the line, under cover of artillery fire and dust clouds, inflicting only 20 Boer casualties to sword and lance (as opposed to 60 at Elandslaagte). French himself saw it as a triumph of the cavalry spirit rather than a charge with cold steel per se.

French entered Kimberley at 6 pm on 15 February, and was entertained at the Sanatorium by Cecil Rhodes, who soon persuaded him to relieve Kekewich, the military commander of the town. Holmes cites this as an evidence of French's tendency to take against people based only on superficial evidence.

French was congratulated by Roberts, and Queen Victoria praised the cavalry's "brilliant success". For his success with the relief, French was promoted for distinguished service in the field on 21 February 1900, from substantive colonel to supernumerary major-general, and to local lieutenant-general. Although French was later criticised for attacking the Boers around Kimberley on 16 February, Roberts' orders to pursue the retreating Cronje did not reach him owing to a cut telegraph line, and there is no evidence that Roberts made further efforts to contact him, although French heliographed to request orders.

==== Paardeberg ====
Orders to pursue Cronje were hand-delivered to French at 10 pm on 16 February. French had only 1,500 mounted men and 12 guns fit for duty, but, setting out at 3 am on 17 February, he and Robert Broadwood led an advanced guard on a forced march, twice as fast as Cronje's force, to intercept them at 10 am as they tried to cross the Modder at Vendutie Drift (around 30 miles from Kimberley). Outnumbered three to one, and with another 2,000 Boers close by, French held his position long enough for the British infantry to catch up with Cronje's army at Paardeberg.

French was too far away to interfere in the Battle of Paardeberg, although he sent a message urging caution—Kitchener ignored this and launched a disastrous frontal assault on 18 February. French spent the day holding off Boers who attempted to reinforce Cronje's force. French also prevented the main Boer field army from escaping across the Modder River after the battle.

==== Poplar Grove ====
Cronje at last surrendered his field army to Roberts on 27 February. On the morning of Klip Drift French had had 5,027 horses, but by 28 February exhaustion had reduced this number to 3,553. As Roberts prepared to advance on Bloemfontein, French was now, on 6 March, ordered to take his division and two Mounted Infantry Brigades and swing seventeen miles around the left flank of the Boer position at Poplar Grove on the Modder River, while Roberts' main force prepared to attack them from the front. Although French now had 5,665 horses again, many of these were of poor quality and sick, and he was short of fodder. On the basis of incorrect information from Colonel Richardson, Director of Supplies, who had not realised that sick horses were also entitled to fodder, Roberts gave French a dressing-down in front of his brigadiers, for consuming too many supplies. This was probably a turning point in their relationship.

French led his men out of camp at 3 am on 7 March, amid confusion as Kelly-Kenny's Division, which was supposed to follow his, had started an hour earlier owing to unclear orders. The moon had set and French had to halt between 5 am and 5:45 am to await daybreak. By 7 am he had reached Kalkfontein Dam, a march of 12 miles, and spent 45 minutes watering his horses. By 7:30 am the Boers began to retreat from their position. Roberts later blamed French for failing to cut them off (and missing a chance to capture President Kruger). French argued that his horses were too weak to do more than trot, and that he was not strong enough as Kelly-Kenny's men had not yet arrived. He concentrated his Division for a pursuit, but even then was beaten off by the Boer rearguard. The Official History supported French's decision, although some felt that French was giving less than wholehearted co-operation after his unjustified public rebuke over the fodder issue. Holmes suggests that French carried out a plan in which he had no confidence because of Roberts' reputation for ruthlessness with unsatisfactory officers.

French and Haig were sceptical about the riding abilities of Mounted Infantry, and felt that Roberts was wasting too many horses on them (Haig letter to his sister 16 March 1900) and that the cavalry had been "practically starving" since 11 February. Bloemfontein fell on 13 March, and soon suffered an outbreak of typhoid. In an implicit criticism of Roberts, French recorded (22 March 1900) that there "would be a grand opportunity for a great strategist at the head of affairs". With Roberts' main army immobilised by disease at Bloemfontein, de Wet was still active making raids around the British periphery. Roberts eventually (20 March) sent French with a single cavalry brigade and some guns and Mounted Infantry in a vain attempt to intercept Jan Hendrik Olivier's column (numbering 6,000–7,000 men) at Thaba 'Nchu. French made another raid to Karee Siding (29 March)—but until the middle of April he devoted most of his energies to inspecting the horses, many of them Argentinian, with which his division was being remounted. French was summoned to see Roberts (5 April 1900), who told him that the fighting at Poplar Grove proved that the future lay with Mounted Infantry.

==== Kroonstad ====
On the march to Pretoria (early May 1900) French's three brigades made up the left wing of Roberts' main thrust. (Other thrusts were by Bryan Mahon and Archibald Hunter over the Bechuanaland border, by Buller up from Natal and a semi-independent command under Hamilton, which might have been French's had he not been out of favour.) French lost another 184 of his still unacclimatised horses making—on Roberts' orders—a forced march to the Vet River.

Louis Botha was now making a stand along the River Zand, in front of the Orange Free State's temporary capital at Kroonstad. French was ordered to encircle Botha from the left, accompanied by Hutton's Mounted Infantry, while Broadwood struck from the right. Roberts over-ruled French's wish to make a wide encirclement and ordered a shallower one—this lost the advantage of surprise, and Botha pulled his forces back so that French ran into strong resistance on 10 May. Roberts now ordered French to pull back and make a deeper encirclement as he had originally proposed, with a view to cutting the railway behind Kroonstad. However, French's cavalry were now too tired, after an advance of forty miles, to achieve much, and Botha's army escaped. The Times History later praised French's rapidity of movement but criticised him—unfairly in Richard Holmes' view—for failure to concentrate his forces.

==== Transvaal ====
Roberts halted in Kroonstad to repair the railway and refit between 12 and 22 May. New horses arrived for French, but a third of them were unfit for action, and French and Hutton were only able to muster 2,330 effectives. French and Hamilton were now sent to threaten Johannesburg from the left.

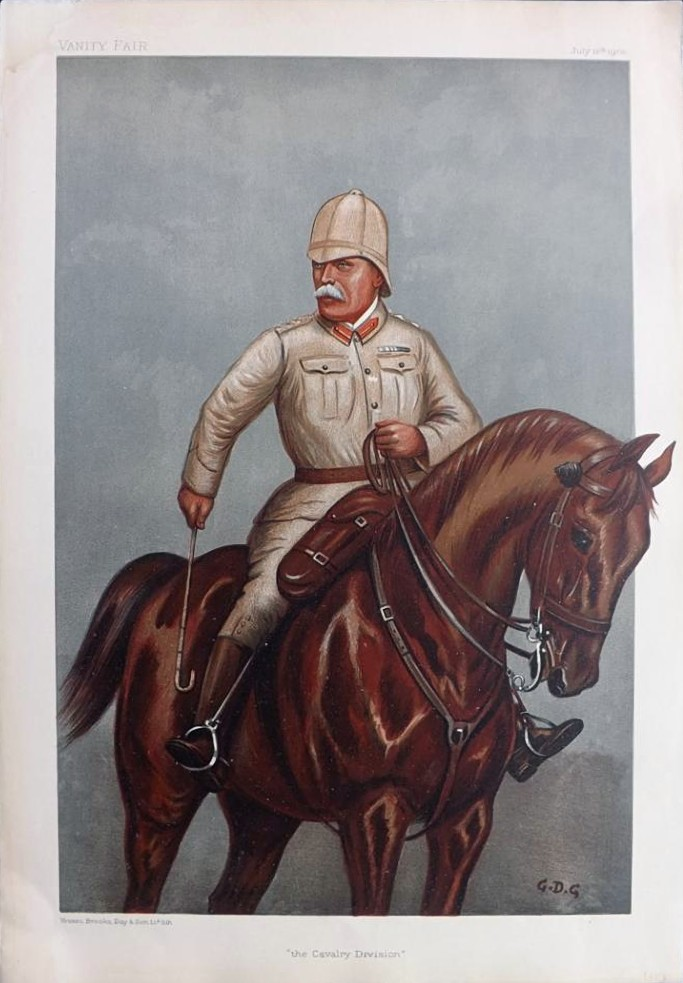
French caricatured by GDG for Vanity Fair, July 1900

Roberts entered Johannesburg (31 May) and Pretoria (5 June), although without pressing Botha to a decisive battle in either case. French correctly dismissed talk of victory as premature, and continued to spend much of his time inspecting remounts—the job of Director of Remounts at Stellenbosch had been given to an incompetent and manic depressive officer, who eventually shot himself. French played a key role at the victory over Botha at Diamond Hill (11–12 June) in the north-east Transvaal. French, leading one of his own brigades in the usual encircling movement, came under heavy fire—a medical major was shot at his side—but held his position despite Roberts' permission to withdraw.

In mid-July French operated against de Wet's guerrilla force around Pretoria, although he did not understand that this was an autonomous force, and advised Roberts that the best defence would be to continue to attack Botha's main army. French was then recalled to take part in another attack on Botha's army, but once again Roberts vetoed French's proposal of a deeper encirclement (on the British right this time), allowing Botha's army to escape.

In late July 1900 Reginald Pole-Carew, commander of 11th Division, refused to accept French's orders. French at first asked to be relieved of responsibility for Pole-Carew's sector, but matters were patched up after what French described as a "somewhat stormy" meeting.

==== Barberton ====
By August 1900 the Boer forces had been pushed into the northeast Transvaal. French was holding a position beyond Middelburg, maintaining moral ascendancy over the enemy by active probing and patrolling as he had around Colesberg earlier in the year. Roberts' plan was to push slowly eastward along the Pretoria-Lourenço Marques railway connecting Pretoria with the sea, while he ordered French to co-operate with Buller as he marched up from Natal. French wrote (24 August) "We sadly want someone in Chief Command here". Roberts at first refused French permission to concentrate the Cavalry Division for an outflanking move towards Barberton, an important Boer depot, and when he at last gave permission in late August Botha's force had retreated too far to be encircled as French had intended. Barberton is surrounded by 3,000-foot mountains, and French once again made a bold encircling move—first (9 September) south from the railway to Carolina, deceiving the Boer commandos that he intended to move southwest. He then moved back, and personally led his 1st Cavalry Brigade up a bridle path through the mountains ready to attack Barberton from the west. As soon as Henry Jenner Scobell, who had been sent around with two squadrons of the Royal Scots Greys, heliographed that he had cut the railway, French led his men down into the town. Scobell captured £10,000 in gold and notes, while French telegraphed to Roberts: "Have captured forty engines, seventy wagons of stores, eighty women all in good working order". Boer sniping from the hills ceased after French threatened to withdraw his men and shell the town.

The war seemed over as Kruger left the country on 11 September 1900 (he sailed to the Netherlands from Portuguese Lourenço Marques on 19 November 1900). French was promoted from supernumerary to substantive major-general on 9 October 1900, while continuing to hold the local rank of lieutenant-general.

=== Under Kitchener ===
French's colonials were sent home and replaced by regular Mounted Infantry. Roberts told French that the Cavalry Division was to be broken up, although he would retain "nominal command", and gave him command of Johannesburg Area. On 17 December 1900 Pieter Hendrik Kritzinger and J. B. M. Hertzog invaded Cape Colony, hoping to stir up rebellion among the Cape Boers. French had only 22,000 men, of whom 13,000 were combatants, to fight 20,000 Boer guerrillas. By April 1901, French's eight columns had captured 1,332 Boers. French was appointed a Knight Commander of the Order of the Bath (KCB).

On 1 June 1901 Kitchener ordered French to take command in Cape Colony. He was ordered to use "severity" against captured rebels—this was intended to complement lenient treatment for those who surrendered voluntarily. French, who had lost several friends during the war, believed that stern measures would help end matters more quickly. French even forced the inhabitants of Middelburg to watch one hanging, incurring a concerned inquiry from St John Brodrick (Secretary of State for War).

During this period of the war—conducting "drives" across the country for Boer guerrillas, and eventually dividing up the country with barbed wire and imprisoning Boer civilians in camps—French had to struggle with out-of-date information, and trying to maintain communications between British forces by telegraph, heliograph and dispatch rider. Kritzinger was driven out of the Cape in mid-August 1901, and Harry Scobell captured Johannes Lötter's commando (5 September 1901). On 17 September Jan Smuts defeated a squadron of Haig's 17th Lancers at Elands River Poort. Gideon Scheepers was captured on 11 October.

French had a serious personality clash with the ascetic Kitchener which endured during the First World War. Although he had been unimpressed by his handling of Paardeberg, he seems to have broadly welcomed his appointment as Commander-in-Chief. In August 1900 Kitchener praised French to the Duke of York (later George V) and wrote to Roberts that French was "quite first rate, and has the absolute confidence of all serving under him, as well as mine".

Kitchener wrote to Roberts praising French for the capture of Lötter's commando, but by 17 January 1902 he wrote to Roberts "French has not done much lately in the colony. I cannot make out why, the country is no doubt difficult but I certainly expected more." After meeting French at Nauuwport Kitchener recorded (14 February 1902) "he was quite cheerful and happy about progress made, though it appears to me slow". Ian Hamilton, now Kitchener's chief of staff, wrote that French was "very much left to his own devices ... he was one of the few men that Kitchener had trusted to do a job on his own".

Kitchener later wrote of French "his willingness to accept responsibility, and his bold and sanguine disposition have relieved me from many anxieties". Kitchener wrote of him to Roberts: "French is the most thoroughly loyal, energetic soldier I have, and all under him are devoted to him—not because he is lenient, but because they admire his soldier-like qualities".

=== War ends ===
Roberts (now Commander-in-Chief of the Forces) ordered French to convene a committee to report on cavalry tactics; French accepted that cavalry should fight dismounted with firearms, but that they needed a better sword. French was appointed (23 October 1901) to command 1st Army Corps at Aldershot, in place of the disgraced Buller. French wrote to thank Roberts, to whose recommendation he guessed – correctly – that he owed the job, but also wrote to Buller, stressing that he had not been offered the position, but had been appointed to it by the King.

The report on cavalry tactics (8 November 1901) demanded an effective rifle for cavalry rather than the existing carbine, but only as a "secondary" weapon. Roberts ordered cavalry to give up their steel weapons for the duration of the campaign, over the protests of French. In early November 1901 French, who was by now reliant on methodical operations and excellent field Intelligence, was infuriated by Kitchener's attempt to micromanage operations. In March French had expected the war to drag on until September 1902, but Kritzinger was captured in mid-November. The war ended at the start of June 1902, after over a month of negotiations. French and Lord Kitchener returned to Southampton on 12 July 1902, and received an enthusiastic welcome with thousands of people lining the streets of London for their procession. He was appointed a Knight Commander of the Order of St Michael and St George (KCMG) in recognition of his services in South Africa, an unusual award for a soldier. He also received honorary degrees from Oxford and Cambridge Universities and the freedom of a number of cities and livery companies.

== Edwardian period ==
=== Corps Commander, Aldershot ===
French was promoted to permanent lieutenant-general for distinguished service in the field on 22 August 1902. He took office as Commander of 1st Army Corps at Aldershot Command, from 15 September 1902. He attracted the attention of Reginald Brett, 2nd Viscount Esher when he testified before the Elgin Commission. Esher reported to the King that he regarded French as the outstanding soldier of his generation. However, Arthur Balfour the Prime Minister, blocked French's appointment to the Esher Committee.

French was proposed as a potential Chief of Staff in 1903–04. Esher wrote "he has never failed" while Admiral John Arbuthnot Fisher—who stressed French's excellent record in South Africa, his skill as a judge of men, and his openness to army-navy operations—wrote "plump for French and efficiency", although Fisher hoped that French would be an ally in opposing Army plans for deploying an expeditionary force to Europe. French's appointment was—to his relief, as he did not relish having to fight with H. O. Arnold-Forster over his mooted reforms—vetoed by the King, who thought him too junior. Esher pressed Neville Lyttelton, who was appointed instead, to give French as free a hand as possible.

French had been insisting since January 1904 that, irrespective of what reforms the War Secretaries were pushing through, I Corps should be the Army's main strike force with at least one of its divisions kept up to strength for service overseas, and managed to force his view through the Army Council in August 1904. French may have privately shared the doubts which others had about his intellectual capacity, but Esher wrote of him that his grasp of strategy and tactics broadened, and, although naturally gregarious, he became more aloof and solitary as he prepared himself for high command. In 1904 French urged the adoption of the Ordnance QF 18-pounder on Esher. He also recognised the importance of howitzers. At the 1904 Manoeuvres French commanded an "invasion force" which advanced inland from Clacton-on-Sea—many horses and supplies were lost, which apparently persuaded French that an enemy would find it hard to invade Britain successfully. In October 1904 French won Fisher's approval with a paper on the strategic importance of the Dardanelles.

French threatened resignation unless his aide de camp Major Algy Lawson, who had not attended Staff College, was appointed Brigade major of the 1st Cavalry Brigade. He suspected a War Office plot led by the rising staff officers Henry Rawlinson and Henry Wilson, whom at this stage he distrusted. Despite being advised by Esher that this was not a sufficiently serious matter to justify such obstinacy, French got his way (December 1904) by threatening to appeal to the King. He also got his way over a similar matter involving Esher's son Lt Maurice Brett, who served as French's ADC, and on this occasion did approach the King's secretary (February 1905).

French was given General Officer Commanding-in-Chief status at Aldershot on 1 June 1905. He was on the Committee of Imperial Defence in 1905, possibly because of his willingness to consider amphibious operations including at various times, in the Baltic and on the Belgian Coast. Philpott discusses French's significant influence on pre-war strategic planning. He generally confined his advice to practical questions such as the difficulties of keeping horses at sea for long periods. French had a poor regard for staff officers and had poor relations with the general staff. At one meeting of the CID he became speechless with rage while listening to Neville Lyttelton proposing that Egypt could be defended by warships in the Suez Canal.

On 19 December 1905 and 6 January 1906, as a result of the First Moroccan Crisis, French was one of a four-man committee convened by Esher to discuss war planning: the options were purely naval operations, an amphibious landing in the Baltic, or a deployment of an expeditionary force to France. At the second meeting French presented a plan for deployment to France or Belgium ten days after mobilisation, possibly mobilising on French territory to save time. Although French helped to draw up deployment plans as asked, it is not entirely clear from the surviving documents that he wholeheartedly supported such a commitment to France ("WF"—"With France"—as this scheme was known) until he was eventually persuaded by Henry Wilson, and he did not entirely rule out an amphibious landing in the Baltic. He also maintained an interest in a possible deployment to Antwerp.

French generally had good relation with Richard Haldane, the new Secretary of State for War, but lobbied him against cutting two Guards battalions (the Liberals had been elected on a platform of retrenchment). In February 1906 French told Major-General James Grierson (Director of Military Operations) that he was to be Commander-in-Chief of the BEF during the next war, with Grierson as his chief of staff. He had meetings with Grierson throughout March until the Moroccan crisis was resolved. French told the Daily Mail (12 May 1906) that a force of trained volunteers would deter an enemy invasion. In June 1906 French still believed that another war scare might come soon, and in July he attended French Army manoeuvres in Champagne, by which he was impressed, although he was less impressed by the Belgian Army. On this trip he was accused of giving unauthorised interviews to the French press, after uttering what Grierson called "a few platitudes" to the Le Figaro correspondent.

Haldane confirmed to Esher (26 September 1906) that French was to be Commander-in-Chief of the BEF during the next war. He visited France unofficially in November 1906 in an attempt to improve his French, although he never became fluent in the language. A Special Army Order of 1 January 1907 laid down that in the event of war Britain would send an Expeditionary force of six infantry and one cavalry division to assist the French. French was promoted to full general on 12 February 1907. In the summer of 1907 he entertained General Victor-Constant Michel, French Commander-in-Chief designate, at Aldershot to observe British manoeuvres.

=== Cavalry controversy ===
French testified to the Elgin Commission that cavalry should be trained to shoot but that the sword and lance should remain their main weapons. Hutton wrote to French that cavalry should retain some shock capacity but that the real issue was recruiting "professional" officers in place of the present aristocratic ones. French strongly disagreed, although he remained on friendly terms with Hutton and recognised that the expense of being a cavalry officer deterred many able young men. Haig's traditional "Cavalry Training" appeared in 1904, leaning heavily on the 1898 Cavalry Drill Book which he had helped French to write, although with a "reforming" preface by Roberts.

In response to a request from Arnold-Forster, French submitted a memorandum arguing that cavalry still needed to fight the old-fashioned way as a European war would begin with a "great cavalry battle". He also sent a copy to the King. Roberts had the support of Kitchener (who thought cavalry should be able to seize and hold positions, but not to roam about the battlefield), but he was away as Commander-in-Chief, India. French's memorandum was supported by Robert Baden-Powell (Inspector-General of Cavalry), Sir Francis Grenfell (who commented that he had not spoken to any junior officer who agreed with Roberts) and Evelyn Wood. In February 1905, after Roberts' removal as Commander-in-Chief, the Army Council authorised the publication of Haig's "Cavalry Training" but without Roberts' preface, although the lance was declared abolished as a weapon of war—a decision ignored by French, who allowed his lancer regiments at Aldershot to carry the lance in field training.

The first edition of the Cavalry Journal appeared in 1906, promoted by C. S. Goldman, an admirer of French. It was made official in 1911. Lieutenant General Friedrich von Bernhardi's Cavalry in Future Wars was published in 1906, with a preface by French, repeating his arguments that cold steel gave the cavalry moral superiority, and that the next war would see an opening clash of cavalry. The new edition of Cavalry Training in 1907 reaffirmed that steel was the main weapon of the cavalry. However, at the end of the 1908 Manoeuvres French criticised cavalry's poor dismounted work, and—to Haig's annoyance—declared that the rifle was cavalry's main weapon. He also noted that infantry lacked a doctrine for the final stages of their attack—something which was to prove a problem in the middle years of the Great War. The lance was formally reinstated in June 1909. However, in his 1909 Inspection Report French again criticised cavalry's poor dismounted work.

Although French believed that the "cavalry spirit" gave them an edge in action, his tendency to identify with his subordinates—in this case the cavalry—and to take disagreements personally caused him to be seen as more of a reactionary. In the event, cavalry would fight successfully in 1914: the "cavalry spirit" helped them to perform well on the Retreat From Mons, while they were still capable of fighting effectively on foot at First Ypres.

There was general agreement that the greater size of battlefields would increase the importance of cavalry. The publication of Erskine Childers' War and the Arme Blanche (1910) with a preface by Roberts went some way to reinstating the reformers' case. Childers argued that there had been only four real cavalry charges in South Africa, inflicting at most 100 casualties by cold steel, but acknowledged that French, "our ablest cavalry officer", disagreed with him. However, in September 1913 the Army Council decreed that Mounted Infantry would not be used in future wars and the two existing Mounted Infantry brigades were broken up.

=== Inspector-General of the Army ===
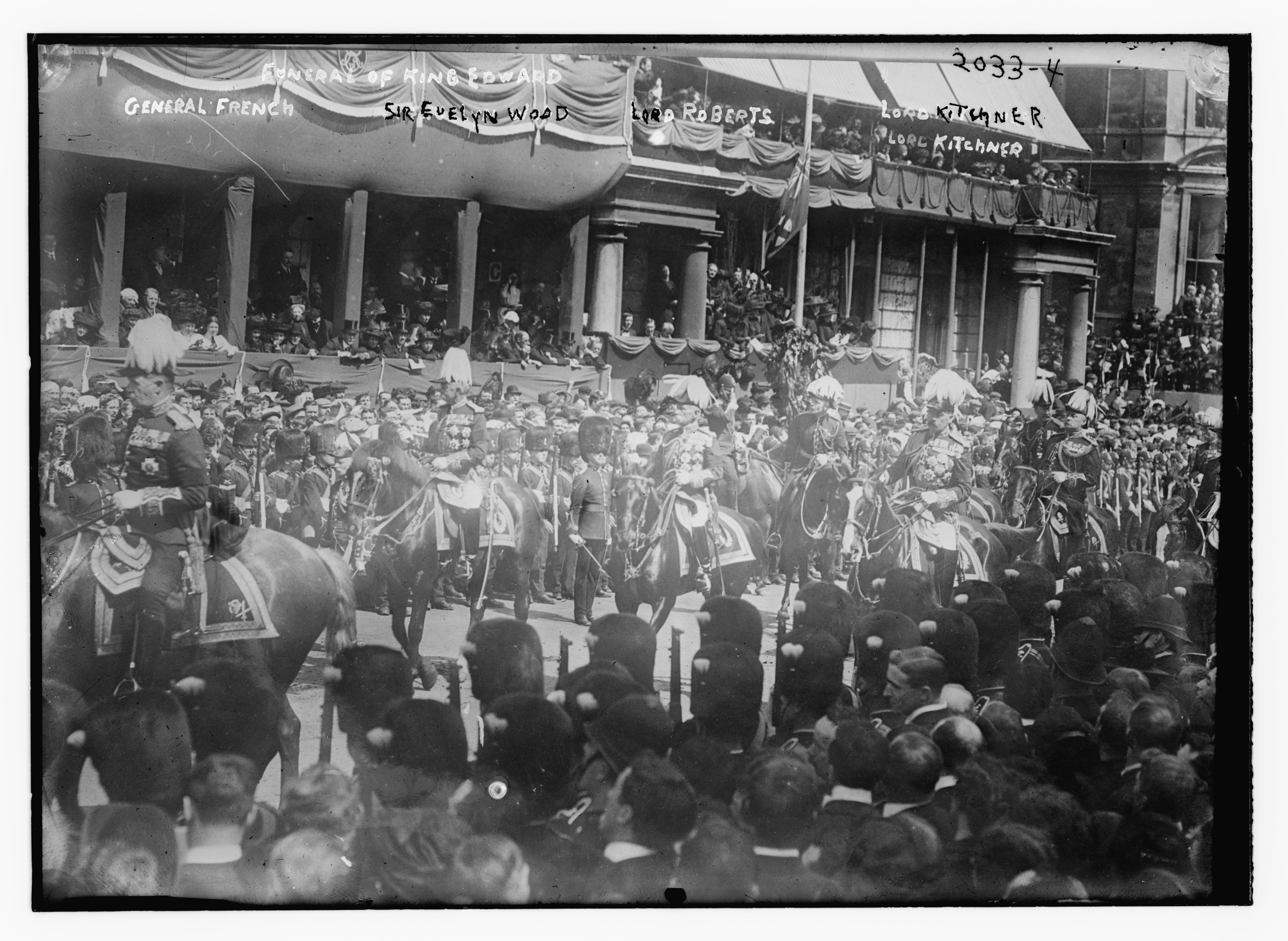
The funeral of King Edward VII. General French, Sir Evelyn Wood, Lord Roberts, Lord Kitchner.

After extensive lobbying by Esher, and with the King's support, French was selected as Inspector-General of the Forces in November 1907. Irish MP Moreton Frewen demanded – apparently in vain – a Court of Inquiry into French's dismissal of his brother Stephen Frewen from command of the 16th Lancers during the Boer War, pointing out to Haldane that French was "an adulterer convicted in a court of law". French was also appointed a Knight Grand Cross of the Royal Victorian Order in 1907.

French openly opposed conscription. He was generally supportive of the new Territorial Force, although he had some doubts about the effectiveness of Territorial Artillery. In 1907–08 he sat on a Committee of Imperial Defence (CID) committee to consider the risk of German invasion—it was decided to retain two divisions at home as a deterrent to invasion, until the Territorial Force was ready. At the August 1908 manoeuvres, French's poor report ended the military career of Harry Scobell, who commanded the Cavalry Division on the exercise, despite being well connected, a personal friend of French, and a successful commander from the South African campaigns. French's reports showed great interest in trenches, machine guns and artillery. He also believed strongly that peacetime drill was necessary to prepare men for combat discipline. In the winter of 1908–09 French served on the "Military Needs of the Empire" sub-committee of the CID, which reaffirmed the commitment to France in the event of war. He was advanced to Knight Grand Cross of the Order of the Bath in 1909. French courted unpopularity with some infantry officers by urging a doubling in the size of infantry companies. In the winter of 1909–10 he toured British troops in the Far East, and in the summer of 1910 he inspected the Canadian Militia.

This period also saw the beginning of the feud between French and Horace Smith-Dorrien, his successor at Aldershot. Smith-Dorrien annoyed French by insisting that cavalry improve their musketry, abolishing the pickets which trawled the streets for drunken soldiers, more than doubling the number of playing fields available, cutting down trees, and building new and better barracks. By 1910 the feud was common knowledge throughout the Army. Smith-Dorrien also objected to French's womanising.

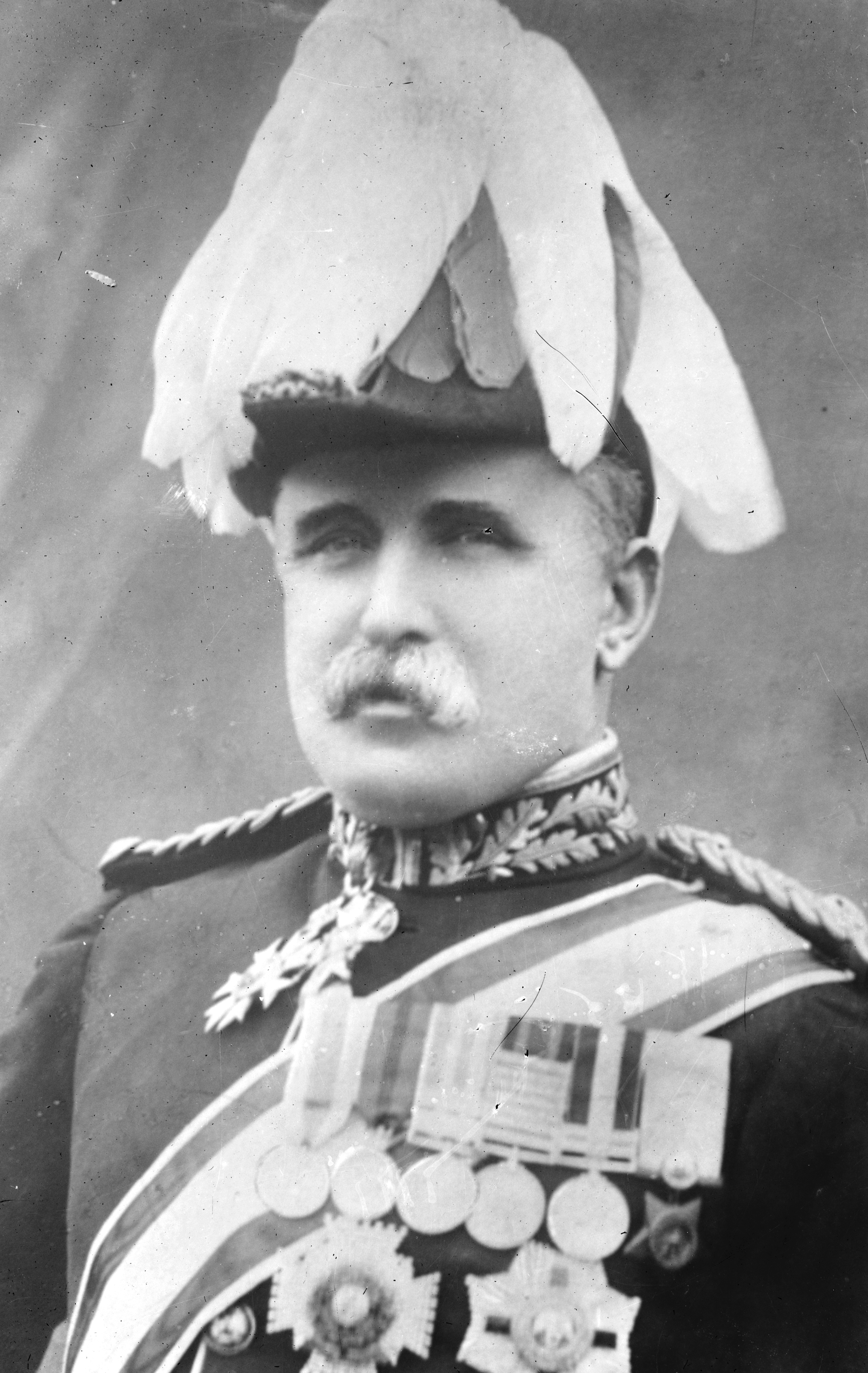
French in full dress uniform as Aide-de-Camp to King George V in September 1911.

French was made an Aide-de-Camp General to the King on 19 June 1911. The Second Moroccan Crisis was occasion for French to push again for greater Army-Navy co-operation. On 23 August Henry Wilson carried a CID meeting with a lucid presentation of the Army's plans for deployment to France; Admiral Arthur Wilson's plans to land on the Baltic Coast were rejected. French spoke to the Navy Club that year on the need for co-operation. The autumn 1911 manoeuvres were cancelled, supposedly because of shortage of water but in reality because of the war scare. French accompanied Grierson and the French military attaché Victor Huguet to France for talks with de Castelnau, Assistant Chief of the French General Staff. On the journey, French talked of how Charles W. H. Douglas and Arthur Paget would command armies under him in the event of war. Plans for British deployment were especially welcome as French war plans were in a state of flux, with Joseph Joffre having been appointed commander-in-chief designate on 28 July. After his return from France in 1911 French inspected German cavalry manoeuvres in Mecklenburg, and was summoned from his bath to receive the Order of the Red Eagle. On presenting him with a signed photograph of himself the Kaiser told him: "You may have seen just how long my sword is: you may find it just as sharp".

In January 1912 French attended the annual staff conference at Staff College, and was impressed by the quality of the discussion. However, he lectured staff officers that they should not consider themselves the superiors of regimental officers, but that their job was to provide the commander with impartial advice and then endeavour to carry out his wishes.

=== Chief of the Imperial General Staff ===
He became Chief of the Imperial General Staff ("CIGS"—professional head of the Army) on 15 March 1912 although he neither had staff experience nor had studied at Staff College. On his first day, he told his three directors (Henry Hughes Wilson—Director of Military Operations, Archibald Murray—Director of Military Training and Launcelot Kiggell—Director of Staff Duties) that he intended to get the Army ready for war. French was receptive to Wilson's wishes to explore co-operation with Belgium. French had initially been suspicious of Wilson as a Roberts protégé, but in 1906 had supported Wilson's candidacy for Commandant of Staff College. By 1912 Wilson had become French's most trusted adviser. On 8 November 1912, with the First Balkan War causing another war scare, Wilson helped French draw up a list of key officers for the Expeditionary Force: Haig and Smith-Dorrien were to command "armies", Edmund Allenby the cavalry division, and James Grierson was to be chief of staff.

In February 1913 Charles à Court Repington wrote a series of articles in The Times demanding conscription for home defence. The Prime Minister H. H. Asquith led the CID "Invasion Inquiry", on which French sat. The conclusions, which were not reached until early 1914, were that two divisions should be retained at home, reducing the size of the BEF. On 30 March he was appointed as colonel in chief of the Royal Irish Regiment.

In April 1913, French told Wilson that he expected to serve as CIGS (extending his term by two years) until 1918, and to be succeeded by Murray. He was promoted to field marshal on 3 June 1913.

French's efforts "to get the Army ready for war" were hampered by budgetary constraints, and he was unsuited by temperament or experience for the job. French caused controversy by passing over four generals for promotion in the autumn of 1913, and angered some infantry officers by forcing through the changes to infantry battalions so that they comprised four large companies commanded by majors rather than eight small companies commanded by captains. French lobbied Secretary of State for War John Seely for an increase in pay and allowances for officers, to widen the social base from which officers were recruited—this was enacted from 1 January 1914.

In the summer of 1913 French, accompanied by Grierson and Wilson, again visited French manoeuvres in Champagne. After the September 1913 Manoeuvres Repington wrote in The Times that French had found it difficult to defeat even a skeleton army. Since 1904 French himself had to act as Director of the Annual Manoeuvres, so that although other officers had the chance to learn to handle divisions, he himself had little chance to learn to handle a force of several divisions. This lack of training may well have been factor in his poor performance in August 1914. The BEF senior officers (French, Haig, Wilson, Grierson and Paget who had replaced Smith-Dorrien by then) met to discuss strategy on 17 November 1913. In his diary Wilson praised "Johnnie French" for "hitting out" at the Royal Navy over their poor transport arrangements, but recorded his concerns at French's lack of intellect and hoped there would not be a war just yet.

=== Curragh incident ===
With Irish Home Rule about to become law in 1914, the Cabinet were contemplating military action against the Ulster Volunteers (UVF) who wanted no part of it, and who were seen by many officers as loyal British subjects. In response to George V's request for his views, French wrote that the army would obey "the absolute commands of the King", but he warned that some might think "that they were best serving their King and country either by refusing to march against the Ulstermen or by openly joining their ranks".

With political negotiations deadlocked and intelligence reports that the Ulster Volunteers (now 100,000 strong) might be about to seize the ammunition at Carrickfergus Castle, French only agreed to summon Arthur Paget (Commander-in-Chief, Ireland) to London to discuss planned troop movements when John Seely (Secretary of State for War) repeatedly assured him of the accuracy of intelligence that UVF might march on Dublin. French did not oppose the deployment of troops in principle but told Wilson that the government were "scattering troops all over Ulster as if it were a Pontypool coal strike". On 19 March French was summoned to an emergency meeting at 10 Downing Street with Asquith, Seely, Winston Churchill (First Lord of the Admiralty), Augustine Birrell (Chief Secretary for Ireland) and Paget, where he was told that Edward Carson, who had stormed out of a Commons debate, was expected to declare a provisional government in Ulster. French was persuaded by Asquith to send infantry to defend the artillery at Dundalk, and by Seely that a unionist coup was imminent in Ulster.

The result was the Curragh incident, in which Hubert Gough and other of Paget's officers threatened to resign rather than coerce Ulster. French, advised by Richard Haldane (Lord Chancellor) told the King on 22 March that he would resign unless Gough, who had confirmed that he would have obeyed a direct order to move against Ulster, was reinstated. French suggested to Seely that a written document from the Army Council might help to convince Gough's officers. The Cabinet text stated that the Army Council were satisfied that the incident had been a misunderstanding, and that it was "the duty of all soldiers to obey lawful commands", to which Seely added two paragraphs, stating that the Government had the right to use "the forces of the Crown" in Ireland or elsewhere, but had no intention of using force "to crush opposition to the Home Rule Bill". Gough insisted on adding a further paragraph clarifying that the Army would not be used to enforce Home Rule "on Ulster", to which French added in writing "This is how I read it. JF CIGS".

Asquith publicly repudiated the "peccant paragraphs". Wilson, who hoped to bring down the government, advised French to resign, as an officer could not be seen to break his word, even at the behest of politicians. Asquith at first wanted French to stay on as he had been "so loyal and well-behaved", but then changed his mind despite French drawing up two statements with Haldane, claiming that he had been acting in accordance with Haldane's statement in the House of Lords on 23 March. Seely also had to resign. French resigned on 6 April 1914.

French had been made to look naïve and overly friendly to the Liberal government. Most officers were Conservative and Ulster Unionist sympathisers, but, with a few exceptions, took pride in their loyalty to the King and professed contempt for party politics. French for his part blamed Roberts for stirring up the Incident. After 1918 French became a Home Ruler, but at this stage he simply thought his duty to be ensuring that the Army obeyed the government's orders.

French told Wilson that Asquith had promised him command of the BEF in the event of war, although nobody realised how quickly this would come. Margot Asquith wrote that he would soon be "coming back", suggesting that Asquith may have promised to appoint French Inspector-General. Churchill described him as "a broken-hearted man" when he joined the trial mobilisation of the fleet in mid-July. French was still seen as a potential Commander-in-Chief of the BEF, although even in early August French himself was uncertain that he would be appointed.

== Commander-in-Chief, BEF ==
=== 1914: BEF goes to war ===
==== Mobilisation and deployment ====
The "Precautionary Period" for British mobilisation began on 29 July. French was summoned by Sir Charles W. H. Douglas (Chief of the Imperial General Staff) and told he would command the British Expeditionary Force (BEF). British mobilisation began on 4 August, and Britain joined the war at midnight.

French presented the War Council plans (drawn up by Wilson) to send the BEF to Maubeuge, although he also suggested that as British mobilisation was lagging behind France's it might be safer to send the BEF to Amiens. French also suggested that the BEF might operate from Antwerp against the German right flank, reflecting French's reluctant acceptance of the continental commitment. This suggestion was dropped when Churchill said the Royal Navy could not guarantee safe passage. Kitchener, believing the war would be long, decided at Cabinet that the BEF would consist of only 4 infantry divisions (and 1 cavalry); French, believing the war would be short, demanded 5 infantry divisions but was overruled. Embarkation began on 9 August.

On 12 August, French, Murray, Wilson and the French liaison officer Victor Huguet met at French's house and agreed to concentrate at Maubeuge, and after another meeting with Kitchener (who had had an argument with Wilson on 9 August—given Wilson's influence over French, this served to worsen relations between French and Kitchener), who still preferred to concentrate further back at Amiens, they left to obtain the Prime Minister's agreement.

French crossed to France on 14 August. President Raymond Poincaré, meeting French on 15 August, commented on his "quiet manner ... not very military in appearance". French told Poincaré that he would not be ready until 24 August, not 20 August as planned. French also met Adolphe Messimy (French War Minister) and Joffre . Sir John's orders from Kitchener were to co-operate with the French but not to take orders from them, and given that the tiny BEF (about 100,000 men, half of them regulars and half reservists) was Britain's only army, to avoid undue losses and being exposed to "forward movements where large numbers of French troops are not engaged" until Kitchener had had a chance to discuss the matter with the Cabinet.

==== Clash with Lanrezac ====
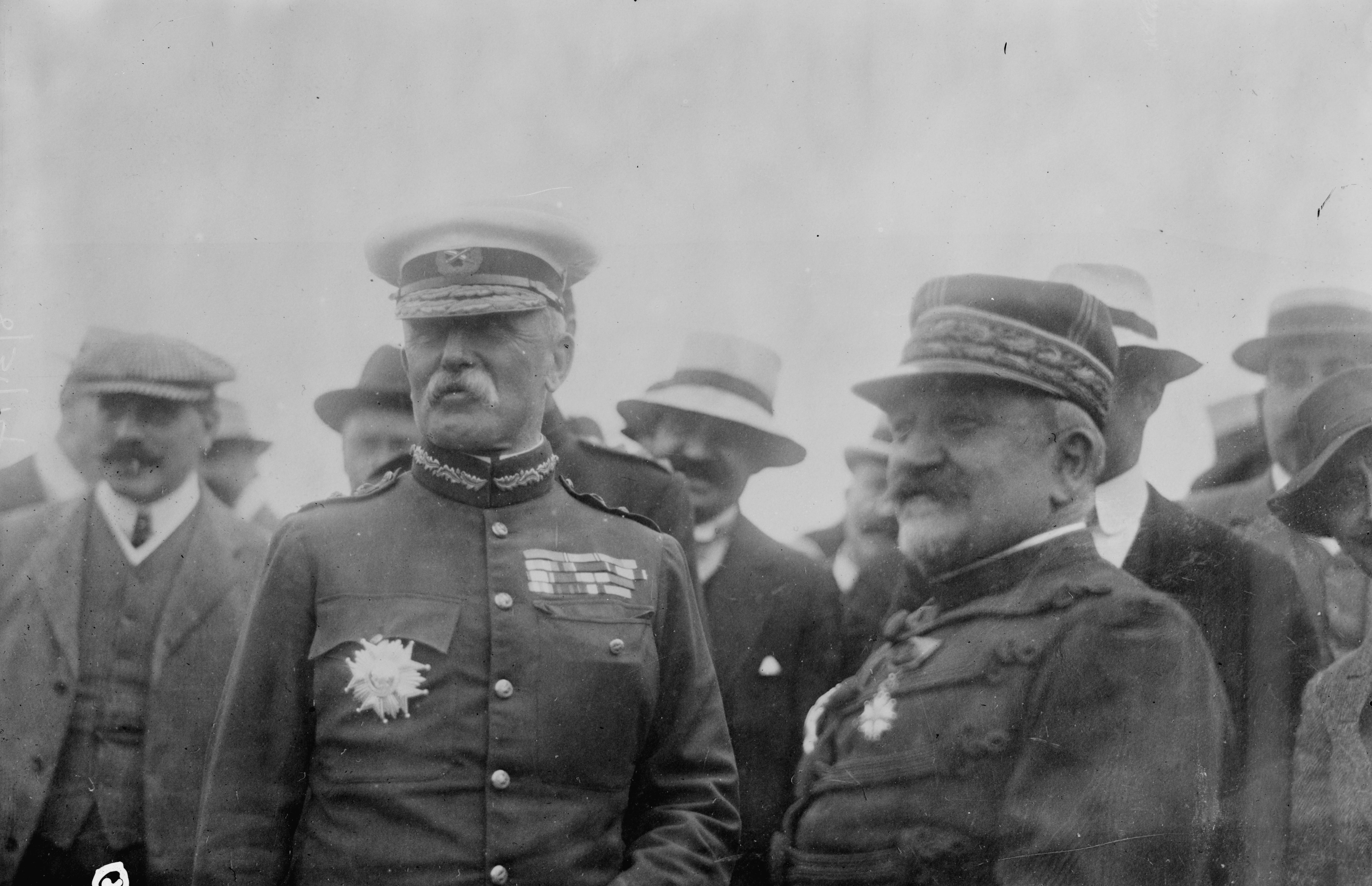
Field Marshal French (left) in Paris

The Siege of Liège ended when the last of the Belgian fortresses fell on 16 August and most of the remaining Belgian troops were soon besieged in Antwerp, opening Belgium to the German advance. Previously ardent and bombastic, French became hesitant and cautious, giving different answers about the date when the BEF could be expected to begin operations in the field.

French met General Charles Lanrezac, commanding the French Fifth Army on his right, at Rethel (17 August)—they were met by Lanrezac's Chief of Staff Hely d'Oissel, with the words: "At last you're here: it's not a moment too soon. If we are beaten we will owe it to you". They conferred in private despite the fact that Lanrezac spoke no English and Sir John could speak little French, Wilson being eventually called over to translate. French informed Lanrezac that his forces would not be ready until 24 August, three days later than promised. The French cavalry under André Sordet, which Sir John had previously asked Joffre in vain to be placed under his command, were further north trying to maintain contact with the Belgians. Sir John, concerned that he had only four infantry divisions rather than the planned six, wanted to keep Allenby's cavalry division in reserve and refused Lanrezac's request that he lend it for reconnaissance in front of the French forces. French and Lanrezac came away from the meeting with a poor relationship. At the time French wrote in his diary that Lanrezac was "a very capable soldier", although he claimed otherwise in his memoirs 1914. Besides their mutual dislike he believed Lanrezac was about to take the offensive, whereas Lanrezac had in fact been forbidden by Joffre to fall back and wanted the BEF moved back further to clear roads for a possible French retreat.

French's friend General Grierson, General Officer Commanding (GOC) II Corps, had died suddenly and French returned to GHQ on 17 August, to find that Kitchener had appointed General Sir Horace Smith-Dorrien to command, knowing that French disliked him, rather than Herbert Plumer (French's choice) or Ian Hamilton (who asked for it).

Spears arrived at GHQ (21 August) and reported to Wilson (French was out visiting Allenby) that Lanrezac did not want to leave his strong position and "had declaimed at length on the folly of attack". Holmes believes French was receiving very bad advice from Wilson at this time, in spite of good air and cavalry intelligence of strong German forces. French set out for Lanrezac's HQ (22 August) but by chance met Edward Spears on the way, who told him that Lanrezac was in no position to attack after losses the previous day at the Battle of Charleroi, which Sir John did not quite believe and that Lanrezac was out at a forward command post. Brushing aside Spears' arguments that another meeting with Lanrezac would help, French cancelled his journey and returned to GHQ; "relations with Lanrezac had broken down", writes Holmes, because Sir John saw no point in driving for hours, only to be insulted once again in a language he did not quite understand.

French was then visited again over dinner by Spears, who warned him that the BEF was now 9 miles (14 km) ahead of the main French line, exposing the BEF to potential encirclement. Spears was accompanied by George Macdonogh, who had deduced from air reconnaissance that the BEF was facing three German corps, one of which was moving around the BEF left flank. Sir John cancelled the planned advance. Also that evening a request arrived from Lanrezac, that the BEF attack the flank of the German forces which were attacking Fifth Army. French thought Lanrezac's request unrealistic but agreed to hold his current position for another 24 hours.

==== Mons ====
Despite the events of the previous evening, French had—perhaps under the influence of Henry Wilson—reverted to the belief that an advance might again be possible soon. French's and Smith-Dorrien's accounts differ about the conference at 5:30 am on 23 August. French's account in his memoirs 1914 stated that he had become doubtful of the advance and warned his officers to be ready to attack or retreat, which agrees largely with his own diary at the time, in which he wrote that he had warned Smith-Dorrien that the Mons position might not be tenable. When 1914 was published, Smith-Dorrien claimed that French had been "in excellent form" and had still been planning to advance. However, in his own memoirs, Smith-Dorrien admitted that French had talked of either attacking or retreating, although he claimed that it had been he who had warned that the Mons position was untenable. Edmonds in the Official History agreed that French had probably been prepared either to attack or to retreat.

French at first believed that the German attacks at Mons were merely trying to "feel" the British position and drove off to Valenciennes to inspect a French brigade. On his return he sent a letter to Lanrezac in which he talked of resuming the attack the following day. Wilson had "calculated" that the BEF was faced only by one German corps and a cavalry division, and was allowed to draw up orders for an attack the next day. Although Macdonogh warned that the BEF was faced by at least two German corps, French did not cancel the planned advance until a message from Joffre (7 pm) warned that he was faced by at least three German corps, although he still ordered Smith-Dorrien to try to hold his ground. At midnight Spears arrived with the news, which disgusted Sir John, that Lanrezac was falling back, and the French Third and Fourth Armies were also falling back after being defeated at Virton and Neufchateau. Murray summoned the Corps Chiefs of Staff at around 1 am on 24 August and ordered them to retreat. Even after Mons, French still thought that a deeper Allied thrust into Belgium would have disrupted the German advance.

Alexander von Kluck sent Georg von der Marwitz's II Cavalry Corps (3 cavalry divisions) around the British west flank to prevent a British retreat on the Channel ports. Sir John French sent a message (24 August), with an unmistakable tone of pique, to Lanrezac, which Spears insisted on watering down, warning that the BEF might have to retreat southwest towards Amiens on its lines of communication, although it is unclear that this would actually have been practicable if the Germans had actually been moving in force around the British left flank. However, Sir John agreed to Joffre's request that the BEF, now numbering 5 divisions as it had been joined by the 4th Infantry Division, would instead fall back on Cambrai if it had to, so that the BEF could still protect the French left flank. Joffre also sent a further two French reserve divisions to the British left flank, the beginning of the redeployment of French forces which would see Michel-Joseph Maunoury's Sixth Army form around Amiens and then fight near Paris. French considered, but rejected, the option of sheltering the BEF in the fortified town of Maubeuge, partly out of instinct that the Germans were hoping to tempt him into allowing himself to be besieged there and partly because he remembered that Edward Bruce Hamley had likened François Achille Bazaine allowing himself to be besieged in Metz in 1870 to a shipwrecked man taking hold of the anchor. French himself issued no direct written orders between 11.15 pm on 21 August and 8.25 pm on 24 August; John Terraine argued that this, along with his absence during the Battle of Mons (although on the German side von Kluck also played little direct role in the battle), marks the point when he and GHQ began to disengage from active command of the BEF, leaving Smith-Dorrien and Haig in effective control of their corps.

=== 1914: Retreat to the Marne ===
==== Le Cateau ====
GHQ moved back from Le Cateau to St Quentin on 25 August. French had a long discussion with Murray and Wilson (25 August) as to whether the BEF should stand and fight at Le Cateau. Wilson and Murray were concerned about the risk of encirclement from the left. Sir John did not agree but wanted to fall back as agreed with Joffre, and hoped that the BEF could pull out and refit behind the River Oise. Besides concern for his men, he was also worried that he was exposing his small force to the risk of destruction which Kitchener had forbidden. Wilson ordered Smith-Dorrien to retreat from Le Cateau the next day.

French was awakened at 2 am on 26 August with news that Douglas Haig's I Corps was under attack at Landrecies, and ordered Smith-Dorrien to assist him. Smith-Dorrien replied that he was "unable to move a man". French was woken again at 5 am with the news that Smith-Dorrien had decided to stand and fight at Le Cateau. Insisting that the exhausted Murray not be woken, French telegraphed back that he still wanted Smith-Dorrien to "make every endeavour" to fall back but that he had "a free hand as to the method", which Smith-Dorrien took as permission to make a stand. On waking properly, French ordered Wilson to telephone Smith-Dorrien and order him to break off as soon as possible.

French and his staff believed that the Cavalry Division had been completely destroyed at Le Cateau (it had in fact suffered no more than 15 casualties) and that 5th Division had lost nearly all its guns, destroying II Corps as a fighting unit (in fact units reassembled after the retreat). French later told Haig that he should have had Smith-Dorrien court-martialled after Le Cateau. In his memoirs French later claimed that Smith-Dorrien had risked destruction of his corps and lost 14,000 men and 80 guns (actual losses of each were around half of this number). However, it has also been argued that the vigorous defensive action at Le Cateau relieved the pressure and allowed the troops to re-organise and make a fighting withdrawal.

On the morning of 26 August, while the Battle of Le Cateau was in progress, Sir John had a hostile meeting with Joffre and Lanrezac at St Quentin. This meeting, held at Joffre's insistence, was the second and last time Sir John met Lanrezac, who attended only reluctantly. He complained of Lanrezac's behaviour, to which Lanrezac "merely shrugged" and gave a vague and academic reply. Joffre talked of his Instruction Generale No 2 which talked of a new French Sixth Army forming around Amiens, but although this had been received by GHQ during the night French had not been shown it. French insisted that he must retreat further, although he agreed to press Kitchener to send the remaining British division bringing the BEF up to six infantry divisions, to France rather than to Belgium. Joffre stayed for lunch (Lanrezac declined to do so), at which the atmosphere improved as he confessed that he too was dissatisfied with Lanzerac. Joffre was surprised at the "rather excited tone" in which Sir John criticised Lanrezac, unlike his calm demeanour of a few days' earlier, and came away deeply concerned at the obvious personal friction between French and Lanrezac, but also at Sir John's reluctance to stand and fight.

==== Retreat ====
GHQ fell back to Noyon (26 August). Huguet reported to Joffre that the British had been defeated at Le Cateau and would need French protection to recover cohesion; he also reported that although the BEF's fighting spirit was undaunted, the British Government might order the BEF to retreat to Le Havre. Colonel Brecard, another liaison officer attached to the British staff, reported that two out of the five British divisions were destroyed and that, in Wilson's view, the BEF would need a week to refit. Sir John warned Huguet that there would be "bitterness and regret" in England over British losses, and Joffre, who had decided to order an attack by Fifth Army to take the pressure off the BEF, visited Sir John at Noyon on 27 August and gave him a message congratulating the BEF for its efforts protecting Fifth Army's flank. In fact Smith-Dorrien's staff were making intense efforts to hold II Corps together, although at a meeting (held at 2 am on 27 August, as Smith-Dorrien had found GHQ's present location with great difficulty) French accused him of being overly optimistic. GHQ moved back to Compiègne on 28 August, although Sir John was able to visit his troops on the march for the first time since 25 August, telling men who were resting on the ground of Joffre's message.

French refused Haig permission to join in an attack by Lanrezac, who wrote of French's "bad humour and cowardice". Even Spears felt Sir John was in the wrong here. The BEF also did not join in Lanrezac's attack on German Second Army at Guise (29 August). Joffre, who had spent the morning with Lanrezac, was concerned by rumours that the BEF might retreat towards the Channel Ports. He visited French in the afternoon, urging him to hold his place in the line promising that Russian successes would soon allow the Allies to attack. However, French insisted that his forces needed 48 hours of absolute rest, and Murray, whom Joffre noticed had been tugging at French's tunic throughout this, then showed an intelligence report of the strength of the German forces facing the BEF. After Joffre had departed in bad humour, French received an incorrect report that Fifth Army was falling back behind the Oise, and issued orders for the BEF to fall back to Rethondes-Soissons; when he received fresh reports that the French were holding their positions after all he replied that it was too late to cancel his orders. Sir John's opinion of Lanrezac was so low that he did not believe reports of his success at Guise (29 August) until he had sent Seely to interview the French corps commanders.

The BEF was doing little fighting on 29 August and on 30 August had no contact with the enemy at all, and on that day III Corps (4th Division and 19th Infantry Brigade) became operational under William Pulteney. On 31 August the BEF engaged in only a few minor cavalry skirmishes. Losses had indeed been high by Boer War standards, and Sir John, believing them to be greater than they were, and that the Kaiser was making an especial effort to destroy the BEF, believed he was carrying out the "letter and spirit" of Kitchener's instructions to avoid undue loss without Cabinet authority.

==== Meeting with Kitchener ====
Spears later wrote of French's coolness and calmness on 30 August, although he also recorded that French no longer took much interest in matters unless they directly impinged on the BEF. Nonetheless a few hours after a meeting with Joffre, Sir John telegraphed him that the BEF would have to leave the line entirely and retreat behind the Seine for up to ten days to refit, tracing supply from Saint-Nazaire and moving the forward base to Le Mans rather than Amiens. Kitchener heard of these plans from the Inspector-General of Communications, and when he demanded an explanation (Sir John's previous messages had been optimistic) French sent a long telegram saying he had told Joffre that the BEF was unable to remain in the front line and that he wanted the BEF to move back behind the Seine, and that would take eight days if done at a pace which would not fatigue the troops unduly. He added (contradicting himself somewhat) that he would have preferred Joffre to resume the offensive, but that Joffre was giving the BEF's inability to join in as a reason for not doing so. He thought that the French Army had "defective higher leading".

On 31 August Sir John received messages from Joffre and President Raymond Poincaré (relayed via Francis Bertie, the British Ambassador) asking him not to withdraw. Joffre pointed out that the Germans were already shifting forces to the East. Kitchener demanded further details, and after showing French's previous message to the Cabinet telegraphed again warning that it was the manner and length of the retreat which concerned the Cabinet. Sir John then replied that the "shattered condition" of II Corps had reduced his offensive capability and that the BEF could not withstand an attack by so much as a single German corps. He wrote: "I do not see why I should again be called upon to run the risk of absolute disaster in order a second time to save (the French)." He also argued that the best solution would be for the French to counterattack and so "close the gap by uniting their inward flanks", although he agreed to halt at Nanteuil, which he expected the BEF to reach the following day, if the French halted their own retreat. Kitchener, authorised by a midnight meeting of whichever Cabinet ministers could be found, left for France for a meeting on 1 September.

They met, together with René Viviani (French Prime Minister) and Alexandre Millerand (now French War Minister). Huguet recorded that Kitchener was "calm, balanced, reflective" while Sir John was "sour, impetuous, with congested face, sullen and ill-tempered". On Bertie's advice, Kitchener dropped his intention of inspecting the BEF. They moved to a separate room, and no independent account of the meeting exists. French admitted that Kitchener had taken exception to his tone and that he had assured him that this was simply in his mind. In his diary Sir John wrote "we had rather a disagreeable time. I think K found he was making a mistake". In 1914 French later claimed that he had told Kitchener that although he valued his advice he would not tolerate any interference in his executive authority so long as he remained in command, and that they "finally came to an amicable understanding". Terraine dismisses as absurd Sir John's later claims that he resented being called away from GHQ (given that no battle was in progress, and that he had played little directing part in either of the two battles fought so far), and that an inspection of the BEF (by Kitchener, Britain's most celebrated soldier at the time) might have disheartened the men by the implied challenge to French's authority. Terraine suggests that Sir John was more anxious to prevent Kitchener from inspecting the BEF as he might have seen for himself that they were less "shattered" than he claimed, and that Haig and Smith-Dorrien might have criticised him if given a chance to speak privately to Kitchener. After the meeting Kitchener telegraphed the Cabinet that the BEF would remain in the line, although taking care not to be outflanked, and told French to consider this "an instruction". French had a friendly exchange of letters with Joffre.

French had been particularly angry that Kitchener had arrived wearing his Field Marshal's uniform. This was how Kitchener normally dressed at the time, but French felt that Kitchener was implying that he was his military superior and not simply a cabinet member. Barbara W. Tuchman argued that French was particularly conscious of this, as he was known for his own quirks of dress. At Asquith's behest Churchill attempted to act as mediator, exchanging letters with French (4 September), who replied that Kitchener was "a fine organiser but he never was and he never will be a Commander in the field". By the end of the year, his hostility had become common knowledge at GHQ and GQG. In 1914 French claimed that Kitchener had come to Paris to try to stop him retreating, which was untrue—it was the manner of the retreat, without consultation with Britain's allies, which was the problem.

On 1 September, while French and Kitchener were meeting, the British fought a small engagement at Néry. The gap between I and II Corps was finally closed for the first time since 25 August, but GHQ had to be evacuated from Dammartin in a hurry under threat from German cavalry, General Nevil Macready being left behind in the confusion and General William Robertson having to hastily wrap up in newspaper a leg of mutton he had been about to eat.

==== Sir John agrees to fight ====
French was pleased at Lanrezac's dismissal (3 September), thinking at first that he had been arrested, and his Military Secretary reported to the King that "the fat pompous political general" had been sacked. Louis Franchet d'Espèrey, Lanzerac's successor, immediately sent a telegram to Sir John signed "Franchet d'Esperey KCVO" promising co-operation.

On return to GHQ, now at Melun, from visits to troops, including a talk with Haig who agreed with him that the troops needed rest and replacements (4 September) he found his staff had agreed to two plans. Murray had been visited by Joseph Gallieni (Military governor of Paris) and Michel-Joseph Maunoury (French Sixth Army, and currently under Gallieni's command) and had drawn up plans for an attack suggested by them. Wilson, on Sir John's orders, had travelled to meet Franchet d'Esperey and had agreed to the plan which became the basis for Joffre's Instruction Generale No 6. Gallieni was still planning, with Joffre's initial agreement, to attack south, not north, of the Marne, so the result of Murray's orders was that the BEF should fall back another day's march, putting it 15 miles south of where Joffre wanted it to be for his new plan. Sir John at first intended to study the situation before making up his mind.

Joffre sent a copy of his plan to GHQ and asked Millerand to lobby the British Government. Hearing at last that Sir John was willing to co-operate, Joffre arrived for a meeting with French on 5 September. According to Spears' account, he explained his plan (in French), ending by clasping his hands together tightly enough to hurt them and begging "Monsieur le Maréchal, c'est la France qui vous supplie" ("Field Marshal, France is begging you"). Sir John cried and, unable to find the words in French, replied "Damn it, I can't explain. Tell him that all that men can do our fellows will do". When Murray protested that the BEF could not be ready as soon as Joffre hoped, Joffre replied that Sir John's word was good enough for him. Joffre believed at the time that the BEF were technically under his orders and that French's uncooperativeness was because the British government were too weak to insist that he obey orders. French was conscious that he was Joffre's senior in rank and had more combat experience.

==== Marne and Aisne ====
The BEF advanced to take part in the First Battle of the Marne on the morning of 6 September, Sir John's mood marred by a telegram from Kitchener urging him to co-operate with Joffre. This was the result of Joffre's appeal to Millerand, and Joffre repaired the damage by praising the performance of French and the BEF to Kitchener. The BEF began its advance from 20 km behind where Joffre had wanted it. Franchet d'Esperey, to the right of the BEF, was repeatedly demanding a quicker advance, and at 3:30 pm Sir John ordered Haig (I Corps, on the BEF right) to resume his advance, but by nightfall Haig was still 12 km away from his objective, having lost only 7 men killed and 44 wounded. The BEF advanced further on 7 September. Lord Ernest Hamilton recorded that "in the strict sense there was no battle ... the fighting ... was desultory". John Charteris, Haig's intelligence adviser, thought the advance "absurdly slow" and noted that the cavalry moved behind the infantry. When the BEF reached the Petit Morin on 8 September, von der Marwitz's German cavalry broke off and retreated further, only for the BEF to halt because of a heavy thunderstorm. Joffre urged that it was "essential" that the BEF advance further. By 8 September, despite outnumbering the enemy by 10:1, the BEF had advanced just 40 km in three days.

On 9 September Sir John, arriving on the spot in person, ordered I Corps to halt as soon as they had reached the main road, a mere 5 miles from the river (at midday Haig, who had halted for four hours after crossing the river after seeing aerial reconnaissance of German forces opposite him, had just given orders to resume the advance). This prevented I Corps from taking Richard von Kraewel's detachment from the east flank, which would have helped II Corps, which had halted after encountering a mixed brigade at Montreuil-aux-Lions, and was now fighting uphill through woods. On the left Pulteney's engineers did not have enough pontoons to cross the Marne, and by nightfall half of 4th Division's battalions crossed on a makeshift floating bridge. The cavalry ("Gough's Command" on the left flank, Allenby's 1st Cavalry Division on the right, each maintaining contact with the adjacent French forces) was in Hew Strachan's words "entirely out of the equation". Sewell Tyng notes that the BEF had "exercised no effective intervention" in the battle and "remained no more than a threat which was never translated into decisive action", although Holger Herwig points out that the men were exhausted after the long retreat, that the French cavalry performed no better and yet the advance – into the gap between the German First and Second Armies – had a decisive effect on the German commanders.

Sir John initially thought that the enemy was only "making a determined stand" on the Aisne. He urged the importance of entrenching wherever possible and stressed that heavy artillery would be necessary going forward.

=== 1914: Autumn battles ===
==== Race to the Sea ====
After lobbying by Winston Churchill, who was keen to bring the Channel Ports under British control, and by Wilson, French lobbied Joffre (27 September) for the BEF, which was less heavily gunned and more mobile than a similarly-sized French Army, to disengage and try to move around the Allied left flank, part of the outflanking movements known as the Race to the Sea. Joffre agreed in principle, although he had private doubts about having no French troops between the BEF and the sea and later came to believe that this move had, by using up scarce rail capacity for ten days, prevented him from reinforcing Lille and had allowed the Germans to capture it.

Throughout September and October 1914 French warned Kitchener that his forces were running dangerously short of shells, at one point being rationed to 20 rounds per gun per day. French was impressed by the first 9.2-inch howitzers, but very conscious of German artillery superiority. French took a keen interest in the development of mortars and grenades, although during his time as Commander-in-Chief more were produced at the BEF's own workshops than in the UK. He also pressed the War Office for more machine guns, believing that a battalion needed at least six or seven (as opposed to two at the start of the war).

The Germans opened fire on the Antwerp outer forts (28 September) and over the opposition of French and Joffre the British 7th Division was earmarked for Antwerp (1 October) instead of for the BEF. French, who did not get on with Rawlinson, was once again suspicious that Kitchener was attempting to usurp operational control of the BEF.

After a temporary stay in Abbeville for five days, GHQ was established in Saint-Omer (13 October) where it was to remain for the rest of French's tenure. When asked to help shore up the Belgian line on his left French said (16 October 1914) "he would be d——d if he would be dictated to by Foch who had better mind his own business".

==== First Ypres ====
French had thought in mid-October of establishing an "entrenched camp" large enough to hold the entire BEF around Boulogne, but was soon persuaded by Foch and Wilson to move around the German flank towards Roulers. The following day he ordered Rawlinson to move on Menin (southeast of Ypres) and Haig's I Corps to move on Roulers (northeast of Ypres), despite reports that there were at least 3 1/2 German corps facing Haig. Sir John had believed the Germans were running out of men (19 October), but instead the BEF ran into German forces also trying to turn the Allied flank. At a meeting on 21 October Joffre refused to lend him enough men to construct a fortified camp around Boulogne; Joffre instead ordered a French corps to the BEF's left, and French ordered the BEF to hold its positions.

French at first reported to Kitchener that the German attacks by Fourth and Sixth Armies were their "last card" and the BEF were holding them off. He was unimpressed by Smith-Dorrien telling him (midnight on 25 October) that his Corps "might go during the night", although he did send reinforcements. Generals George Macdonogh and Percy Radcliffe later testified to the Official Historian James Edward Edmonds in the early 1920s that French "believed what he wished to believe" and "never could believe that the Germans were not at their last gasp". He thought "everything was going splendidly" and "the Germans were exhausted" until warned of the arrival of German reinforcements, at which point he (allegedly) grew angry and banged his fist on the table shouting "How do you expect me to carry out my campaign if you carry on bringing up these blasted divisions?"

Erich von Falkenhayn now ordered a new attack south of Ypres, between Gheluveld and Ploegsteert Wood, by "Army Group Fabeck". IV Corps was broken up (27 October) and Rawlinson and his staff sent home to supervise the arrival of 8th Division. French still expected to attack, turning the German western flank, on 29 October, and even after the Germans had pressed I Corps hard SE of Ypres that day (he later claimed in 1914 to have realised that the BEF could now do no more than hold its ground, but he, in fact, issued orders for the flanking attack to go ahead on 30 October). Sir John supervised the arrangement of reinforcements from Smith-Dorrien and Pierre Joseph Dubois' 9th corps to Haig's and Allenby's hard pressed forces at Ypres (30 October). Once again, the British planned to counterattack, but French was roused from his sleep (12:30 am on 31 October) by Foch, who warned him that his staff had spotted a gap in the British lines at Hollebeke Chateau; Foch advised him to "hammer away, keep on hammering" and promised to send a further eight French battalions and three batteries. Sir John spent the crisis day of 31 October visiting Allenby and Gough, and was with Haig when they learned that a single battalion of the Worcesters had retaken Gheluveld ("The Worcesters saved the Empire" French later wrote). He then met Foch at the town hall at Ypres to warn him that he had no more reserves apart from "the sentries at his gate"—the next day (1 November) Haig's I Corps held its ground, with cooks, grooms and drivers pressed into the line, and aided by French counterattacks which drew off German reserves. The line stabilised, although there was a final day of crisis on 11 November.

The fighting at Ypres, the last before major trenching began, destroyed the last of the original BEF. Since the outbreak of war the BEF had suffered 90,000 casualties, 58,000 of them in October and November, compared to an initial infantry strength (the first seven divisions) of 84,000. Of those who had landed in August, an average of one officer and thirty men per battalion remained. French was particularly disturbed at the lack of company commanders, and extremely reluctant to send trained officers and NCOs home to train the New Armies.

==== Possible dismissal ====
Sir John was unable to get away during the Battle of Ypres to attend the Dunkirk conference (1 November) between Kitchener and Joffre, Foch and Millerand. There Kitchener offered to replace French with Ian Hamilton, but Joffre declined, saying this would be bad for BEF morale and he worked "well and cordially" with Sir John. Foch told Wilson of this on 5 November. French sent Captain Freddy Guest to complain to the Prime Minister, who refused to believe it, and both Asquith and Churchill wrote French reassuring letters. French went to see Foch (6 November) to thank him for his "comradeship and loyalty". This did not stop him writing to Kitchener on 15 November that "au fond, they are a low lot, and one always has to remember the class these French generals come from". French talked of inciting Howell Arthur Gwynne to start a press campaign against Kitchener.

Over lunch on 21 November Haig noted that French looked unwell—French told him he thought he had had a heart attack and had been ordered to rest by his doctors. The King visited France (30 November – 5 December) and passed on his concerns that the Germans were about to invade Britain with 250,000 men, a rumour which French assumed to have been concocted by Kitchener. French's aides made inquiries—apparently in vain—about an increase in "table money" (expenses for entertaining visiting dignitaries) on top of his official salary of £5,000 per annum.

==== End of 1914 ====
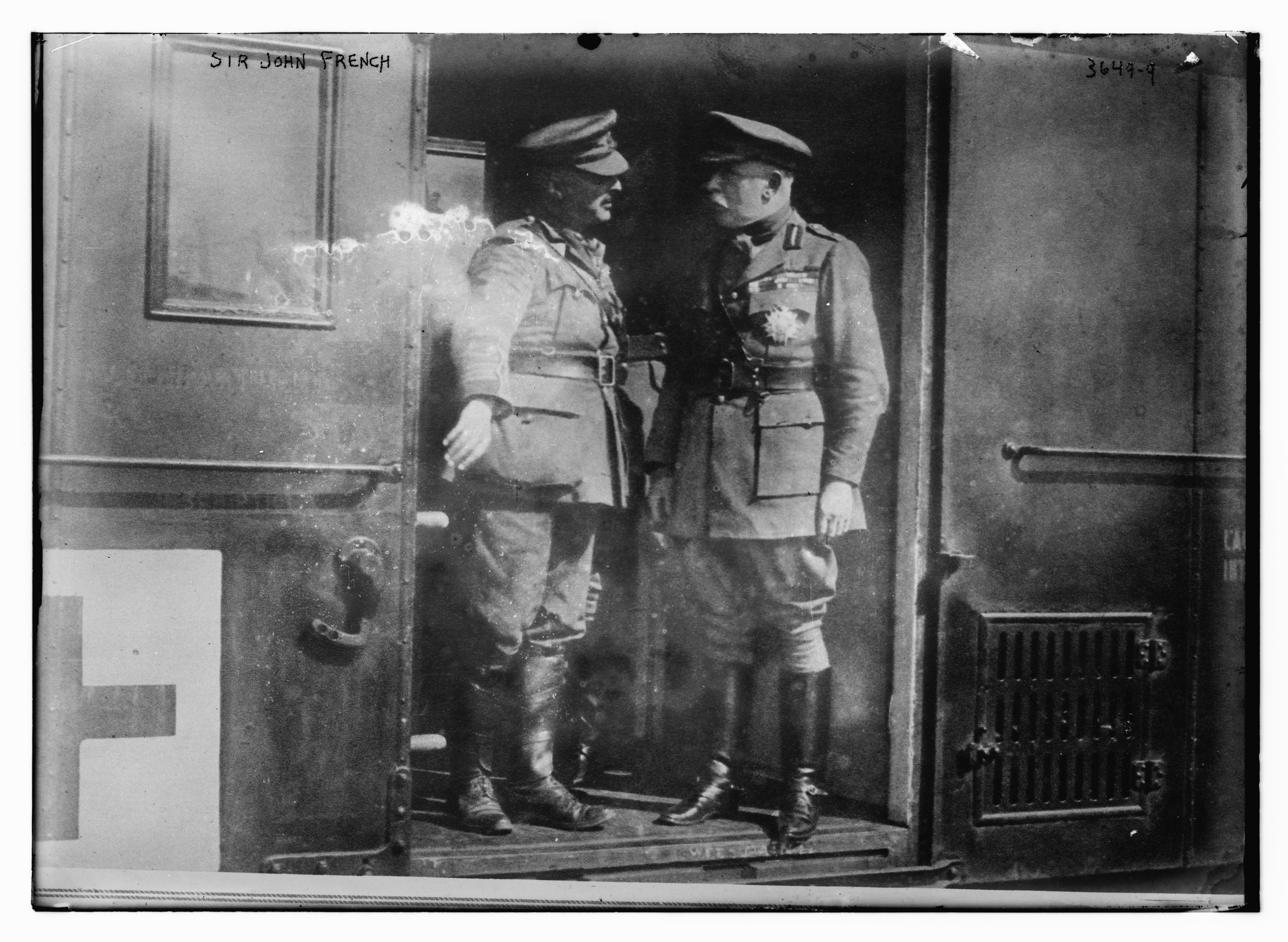
Sir John French, 1914.

In late November and early December the Germans moved forces to the East, and French expected the Russians to defeat them soon. In December he offered limited assistance to French attacks, out of affection for Foch and fear that Joffre would otherwise complain to Kitchener, and despite his concerns that the ground on Smith-Dorrien's front was too wet. Foch said of French (8 December 1914) "How he likes to cry, this Baby".

The Foreign Office (9 December) formally asked the French government for the BEF to move to the coast where it could co-operate with the Royal Navy and the Belgian Army, but this was rejected by Millerand on Joffre's advice, and Foch regarded the plan "with the greatest contempt", although on a visit to GHQ (11 December) he found Sir John only mildly in favour. A German counterattack (20 December) mauled the Indian Corps, who could not handle the cold, so badly that they had to be pulled into reserve.

French was still dissatisfied with Murray's performance as BEF Chief of Staff, but Asquith and Kitchener (20 December) forbade him to replace Murray with Wilson. The BEF was split into Haig's First Army (I, IV and Indian Corps) and Smith-Dorrien's Second Army (II and III Corps and 27th Division), effective 25 December. Allenby's Cavalry Corps and Michael Rimington's Indian Cavalry Corps continued to report directly to French.

At the Chantilly Conference (27 December 1914) French agreed with Joffre that the British Cabinet was mad. They discussed the relative merits of shrapnel and high-explosive shell, and events on the Eastern Front. Joffre told Sir John of his plans for twin offensives at Arras and Rheims in 1915, the former offensive to be assisted by the BEF, and then a further thrust towards the Rhine from Verdun and Nancy. He agreed that the British could take over line up to the coast but only as further reinforcements arrived, which would not be until much later in 1915.

=== 1915: Neuve Chapelle ===
==== Deployment of the New Armies ====
French had hoped to incorporate the Belgian Army into the BEF, but Albert I of Belgium vetoed this. French instead demanded that the New Armies be incorporated into existing units. All the senior commanders agreed that to have the New Armies fighting under their own inexperienced division and corps staff would be folly.

French was further irritated by an "incomprehensible" letter from Kitchener stating that no more troops should remain on the Western Front than were necessary to hold the line, and seeking GHQ's views as to which other theatres British troops should be redeployed. French replied that given sufficient resources he could break the German front, that to attack the Ottoman Empire would be "to play the German game" and that he preferred an advance into Serbia via Salonika, or preferably an attack to clear the Belgian Coast, and that if Russia collapsed the government would have no choice but to send all available troops to France. French also had Murray hand-deliver a copy of this letter to the Prime Minister, earning French a rebuke from Kitchener for not using the normal channels of communication.

The War Council discussed French's demand that 50 battalions be sent to France, but in the face of Kitchener's strong opposition it was agreed instead to consider other fronts. French, having sent Wilson and Murray ahead to raise support, himself lobbied the War Council (13 January), informing them that he expected only 5,000–8,000 casualties in his forthcoming offensive, and that the Germans were short of manpower and would have reached the end of their resources by November 1915. Although he expected Joffre's offensives in 1915 to be successful, he "relied on the Russians to finish the business". Kitchener agreed, but the War Council was then swayed by Churchill arguing for an attack on the Dardanelles, and it was agreed to send French only two Territorial Divisions by mid-February.

The mooted Flanders Offensive was then cancelled altogether after further lobbying of Kitchener by Joffre and Millerand. Sir John agreed to relieve two French corps north of Ypres to allow Joffre to build up French reserves for his own offensive. Murray was sent off sick for a month (24 January) and French demanded his resignation. Robertson replaced him.

==== Argument with Joffre ====
At the War Council in London (9 February) French learned that the regular 29th Division was to be sent to the Near East rather than to France as he had been promised. French opposed this transfer, but his advice was not adopted. Sir John believed that the Russian withdrawals were "only a strategic move" designed to overextend the Germans. He ordered Haig to prepare for an attack at Aubers Ridge, rather than an attack by Smith-Dorrien at Messines-Wytschaete Ridge, as he had more confidence in both Haig and his troops than he had in Smith-Dorrien. GHQ then learned that Joffre wanted de Maud'huy's French Tenth Army to attack at Vimy, with which attack Haig was ordered to co-ordinate his efforts.

Joffre wrote a letter of complaint that the BEF might not be carrying out Sir John's promise to take over more line; in reply French summoned the liaison officer Victor Huguet to complain of Joffre's claims that the British had demanded French participation in the offensive. When he had calmed down he sent Robertson and Wilson to smooth things over with Joffre. Even so, Joffre was angered by French's formal reply and thought that he ought to be able to carry out the planned relief as he was receiving the 46th (Territorial) Division. Millerand wrote to Kitchener to complain, enclosing another letter of complaint from Joffre. Kitchener forwarded both letters to Sir John, along with a letter of complaint of his own. Joffre thought French a "liar" and "a bad comrade".

==== Neuve Chapelle ====
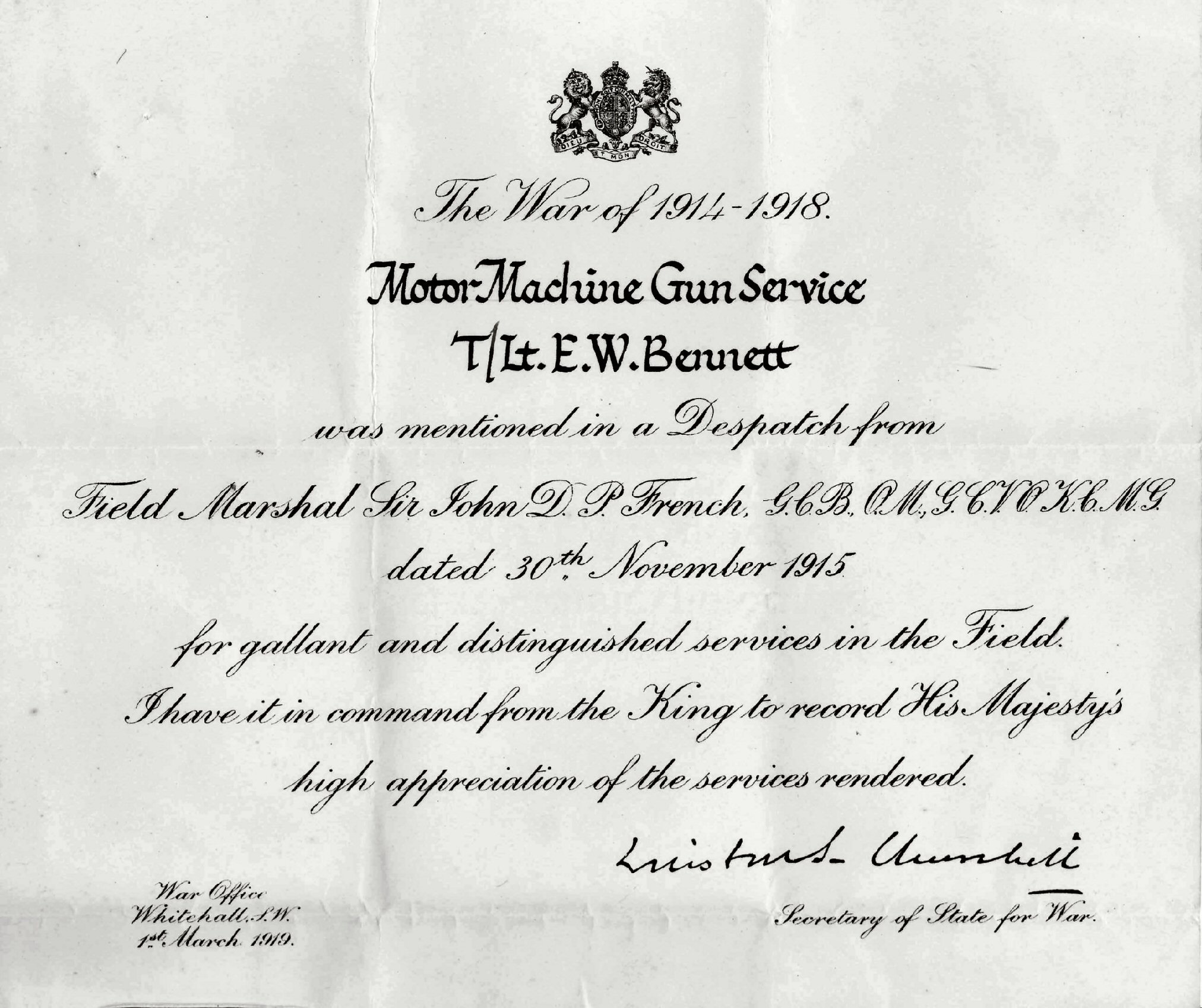
Official notice of "mentioned in dispatches" by French for a soldier in the Motor Machine Gun Service for gallantry at the Battle of Neuve Chapelle. Signed by Churchill who was Secretary of State for War in 1919 when the citation was issued.

French genuinely hoped for a breakthrough at Neuve Chapelle (10–12 March 1915) and personally briefed the cavalry commanders Allenby and Rimington beforehand, although, aware of the effect of modern firepower on cavalry, he cautioned Rimington against getting too close to the enemy. He believed that victory would prove to Kitchener that British efforts should be concentrated on the Western Front, and that it would be merely a prelude to a much larger Battle of Lille. French moved to a forward headquarters at Hazebrouck during the battle.

A renewed attack was planned for 22 March, but French was told by Lieutenant-General Roland Maxwell (Quartermaster General) that sufficient shell was available only for a bombardment half the intensity of Neuve Chapelle, and he was warned by John Du Cane of defective fuses causing guns to explode (14 March). To some extent the shell shortage was an excuse, as French was also critical of planning errors in First Army's attack. Kitchener told Asquith (18 March) that French was "not really a scientific soldier; a good capable leader in the field, but without adequate equipment and expert knowledge for the huge task of commanding 450,000 men."

French's almost daily letters to his mistress in 1915 reveal his wish to see Kitchener sacked, his concern at lack of high explosive shells, his ambivalent relations with the French (although sympathetic at the political interference which French generals suffered), his anger (shared with many other Western Front generals) at the way scarce men and shells were being sent to Gallipoli, and his belief that the German advance into Russia in 1915 would ultimately fail; he hoped that Germany would sue for peace by the summer of 1915 or spring 1916.

=== 1915: Aubers Ridge and shells scandal ===
Joffre renewed negotiations for an Anglo-French offensive in Artois, and again asked Sir John to relieve the two French corps north of Ypres. He agreed to do so by 20 April. French breakfasted with Kitchener (31 March) who told him that he and Joffre were "on ... trial" over the next five weeks, and that the Allied governments would reinforce other theatres unless they made "substantial advances" and "br[oke] the German line". There were rumours in both British and French circles, probably baseless, that Kitchener coveted French's job for himself. French also objected to rumours that Joffre was trying to put the BEF under Foch's command. By April 1915 the BEF had grown to 900,000 men. French continued to be dissatisfied at Smith-Dorrien's grip on his army and in March was concerned that the rate of sickness was running at three times the rate in Second Army as in First.

The Germans attacked (22 April) ground which Smith-Dorrien had recently taken over from the French, using poison gas, causing some French units to break on the British flank. Sir John spurred on Smith-Dorrien in costly counterattacks, but thought the French had made "a horrible mistake" and "Joffre ... really deceived me" in holding the line so thinly. Sir John was angry (26 April 1915) that French troops had broken under German gas attack, commenting that French troops had also failed to hold their positions in the retreat of 1914. Smith-Dorrien suggested withdrawing to the so-called "GHQ Line". French privately agreed, but was angered that the suggestion came from Smith-Dorrien. Plumer was the given responsibility for the Ypres Salient (27 April). Smith-Dorrien was finally relieved of command of Second Army (6 May).

On 2 May French, who appears to have persuaded himself that a short sharp bombardment might work once again, assured Kitchener that "the ammunition will be all right", a declaration which Kitchener passed on to Asquith. This caused Asquith to claim in a public speech that there was no munitions shortage in the BEF. The attack at Aubers Ridge, against stronger German positions (9 May), failed. French watched the battle from a ruined church and attributed the failure to lack of HE shelling. He returned to GHQ to find an order to send shells to Gallipoli, although after protest replacement shells were sent from the UK within days. Fighting still continued at Ypres, and Sir John was under pressure from Joffre to renew the attack at Aubers Ridge. Although he would have preferred (10 May) to stand on the defensive until more high explosive was available, he agreed to Joffre's pressure to take over more French line and renew the attack.

==== Shells Scandal ====
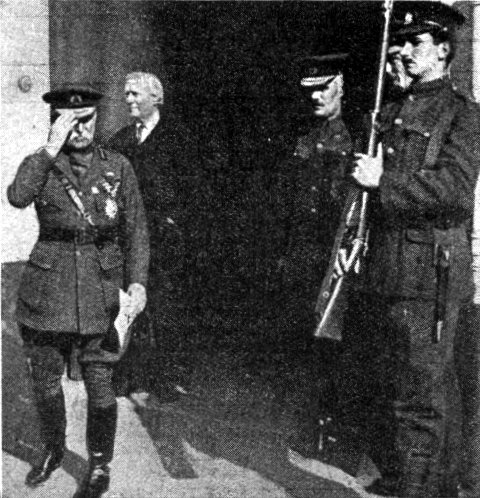
Sir John French, and the British prime minister, H. H. Asquith, at BEF Headquarters in June 1915.

After Aubers Ridge Charles a Court Repington sent a telegram to The Times blaming lack of high explosive shell, which despite being heavily censored by Macdonogh was printed after Brinsley Fitzgerald assured him Sir John would approve. French had, despite Repington's denial of his prior knowledge at the time, supplied Repington with information, and Fitzgerald and Freddie Guest were sent to London to show the same documents to Lloyd George and the Opposition leaders Bonar Law and Arthur Balfour. Repington's article appeared in The Times (14 May 1915). Kitchener wrote to French that day that Repington should not be allowed out with the Army, to which French replied that Repington was a personal friend and he (French) "really ha(d) no time to attend to these matters".

Kitchener, reluctant to deploy the volunteer New Armies to the Western Front, wired French (16 May 1915) that he would send no more reinforcements to France until he was clear the German line could be broken, although at the end of May he agreed to send two divisions to keep Joffre happy. The King wrote of French at this time to his uncle the Duke of Connaught: "I don't think he is particularly clever and he has an awful temper" (23 May 1915). Another offensive at Festubert began on the night of 15–16 May and dragged on until 27 May. Some ground was gained (1,000 yards over a 3,000 front) and the Germans had to rush in reserves. French was still optimistic that with sufficient high explosive a breakthrough for cavalry could be achieved. Robert Whigham (BEF Sub-Chief of Staff) "was very sick as (at French's behest) he had to cancel & then rewrite his orders" (Wilson Diary 27 May 1915).

The shells scandal contributed to the fall of the Liberal Government. Although French's involvement was widely rumoured, many, including the Prime Minister, refused to believe it. At the time Esher and others thought a clique of people were acting in what they believed to be French's interests; Margot Asquith and William Palmer, 2nd Earl of Selborne suspected French's American friend George Moore. French later claimed in 1914 that he had leaked information to Repington to "destroy the apathy of a Government which had brought the Empire to the brink of disaster". By the time he wrote 1914 he had come to regard Asquith and Haig as responsible for his removal at the end of 1915, but at the time French was still on good terms with Asquith and wrote to him (20 May 1915, the day before the Daily Mail attacked Kitchener, and whilst Asquith was forming his new coalition government) urging him "as a friend" to sack Kitchener. Holmes believes French's object was to bring down Kitchener rather than the whole government.

=== 1915: Loos and resignation ===
==== Planning Loos ====
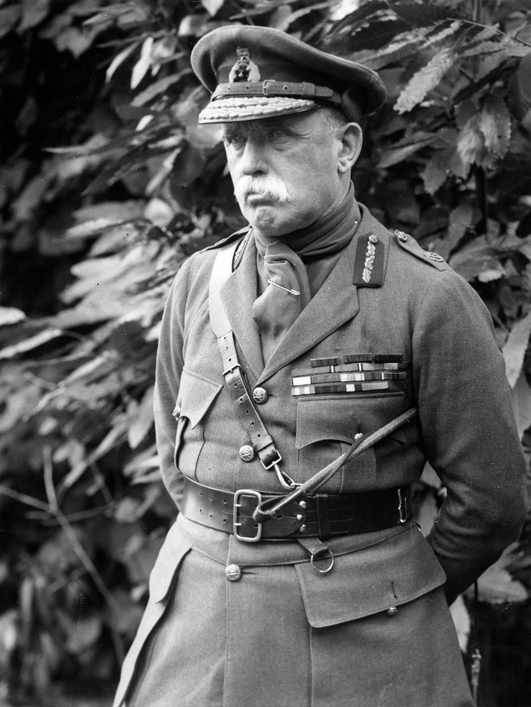
French, photographed in August 1915

Joffre often wrote to Kitchener complaining about French. Sidney Clive noted that meetings between French and Joffre could be counterproductive as "the former is irritable & the latter silent".

Joffre planned once again for attacks by the BEF and French Tenth Army, combined with another French offensive in Champagne. He wrote to GHQ (12 June) that the ground at Loos was "particularly favourable", although Haig reported (23 June) that it was unsuitable for an attack. At a conference at Chantilly (24 June) French and Joffre agreed that further attacks on the Western Front were needed and that they should ask their governments to send all available troops to France rather than other fronts.

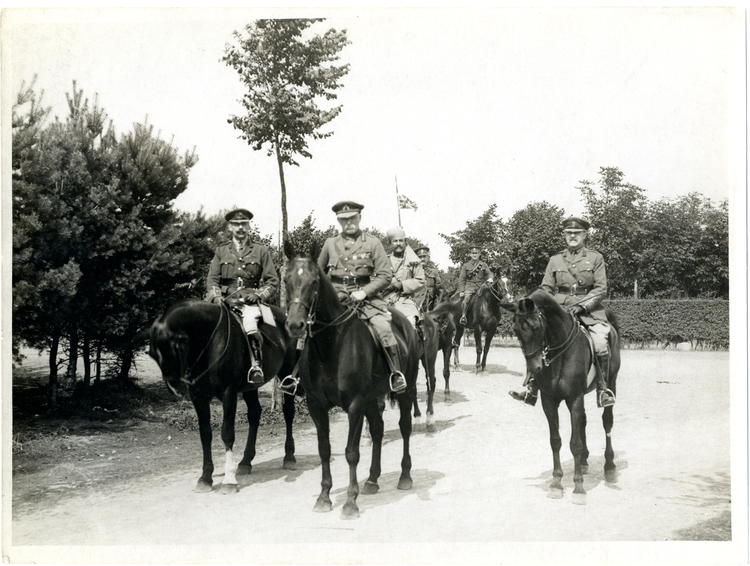
Field Marshal Sir John French with two ADCs, on horseback, Blendecques, France, 18 August 1915. In the background is his escort of troopers from the 4th Cavalry and the 15th Lancers. The Indian figure just behind the main group is Sirdar Bahadur Khwaja Mahomed.

Asquith had a lengthy discussion (26 June) about the desirability of sacking French. Wilson thought French "ridiculously optimistic about the German state of collapse", while General Aylmer Haldane thought him "obstinate and unreasonable" (Haldane diary, 30 June 1915). After a "long talk" with Robertson (1 July) the King became convinced that French should be removed. Margot Asquith warned French (2 July) that his aides Freddy Guest and Brinsley Fitzgerald (whom she thought "wonderfully unclever") were making trouble between him and Kitchener. Kitchener also opposed a major British offensive (Calais Conference, 6 July). Sir John expressed his concern that, although a successful attack was possible, his artillery had less than the 17 rounds per day which he deemed necessary. He was initially sceptical of Haig's reluctance to attack and inspected the ground himself (12 July). Although he felt that the high ground already in British hands would provide good observation, he broadly concurred with Haig's analysis. Robertson also opposed the attack.

Haig discovered (14 July) that the King had lost confidence in French, and discussed the matter with Kitchener. Wilson noted that relations between French and Robertson were breaking down by the summer, and suspected (correctly) that Robertson was blackening French's reputation by sending home documents which French had refused to read or sign. French told Clive (20 July) to inform GQG that ammunition shortage only permitted "holding" attacks and then (25 July) announced that there would be no attack at all. However, after an unsatisfactory meeting with Foch the previous day, he wrote a personal letter to Joffre (28 July) leaving the decision in his hands, although he noted concerns in his diary that night that the French attack at Arras would not be "decisive". He also noted (diary, 29 July) that the French were annoyed at British strikes and failure to bring in conscription, and might make a separate peace if Britain did not pull her weight, and may also have agreed to the attack because he had learned that his own job was under threat. Kitchener, who had changed his mind, eventually (19 August) ordered the attack to proceed.

==== Loos ====
French went sick in September, Robertson acting as Commander-in-Chief BEF. Both GHQ and First Army persuaded themselves that the Loos attack could succeed, perhaps as the use of gas, whose use by the Germans at Second Ypres had been condemned by Sir John, would allow a decisive victory. French was privately doubtful that a breakthrough would be achieved and was concerned that in the event of failure the government would want to "change the bowler". Haig (and Foch) wanted the reserves close to hand to exploit a breakthrough on the first day; French agreed to deploy them closer to the front but still thought they should be committed on the second day.

On the day of the attack, the engineers manning the poison gas cylinders warned not to use them, citing the weakness and unpredictability of the wind. When overruled by Lt-General Hubert Gough the gas drifted back into the British lines and caused more British than German casualties. Though one division did break through the German defences on the first day (25 September), French had positioned reserves too far to the rear, and they only reached the front line by night. Wanting to be closer to the battle, French had moved to a forward command post at Lillers, less than 20 miles behind First Army's front. He left Robertson and most of his staff behind at GHQ and had no direct telephone link to the First Army. Haig's infantry attacked at 6:30 am on 25 September and he sent an officer by car requesting release of the reserves at 7 am—he did not hear until 10.02 am that the divisions were moving up to the front. French visited Haig between 11 and 11:30 and agreed that Haig could have the reserve, but rather than using the telephone he drove to Richard Haking's headquarters and gave the order personally at 12:10 pm. Haig then heard from Haking at 1.20 pm that the reserves were moving forward, but by the time the men, already exhausted from an overnight march in the rain, reached the front line through the chaos of the battlefield they were committed against strengthened German positions the following morning.

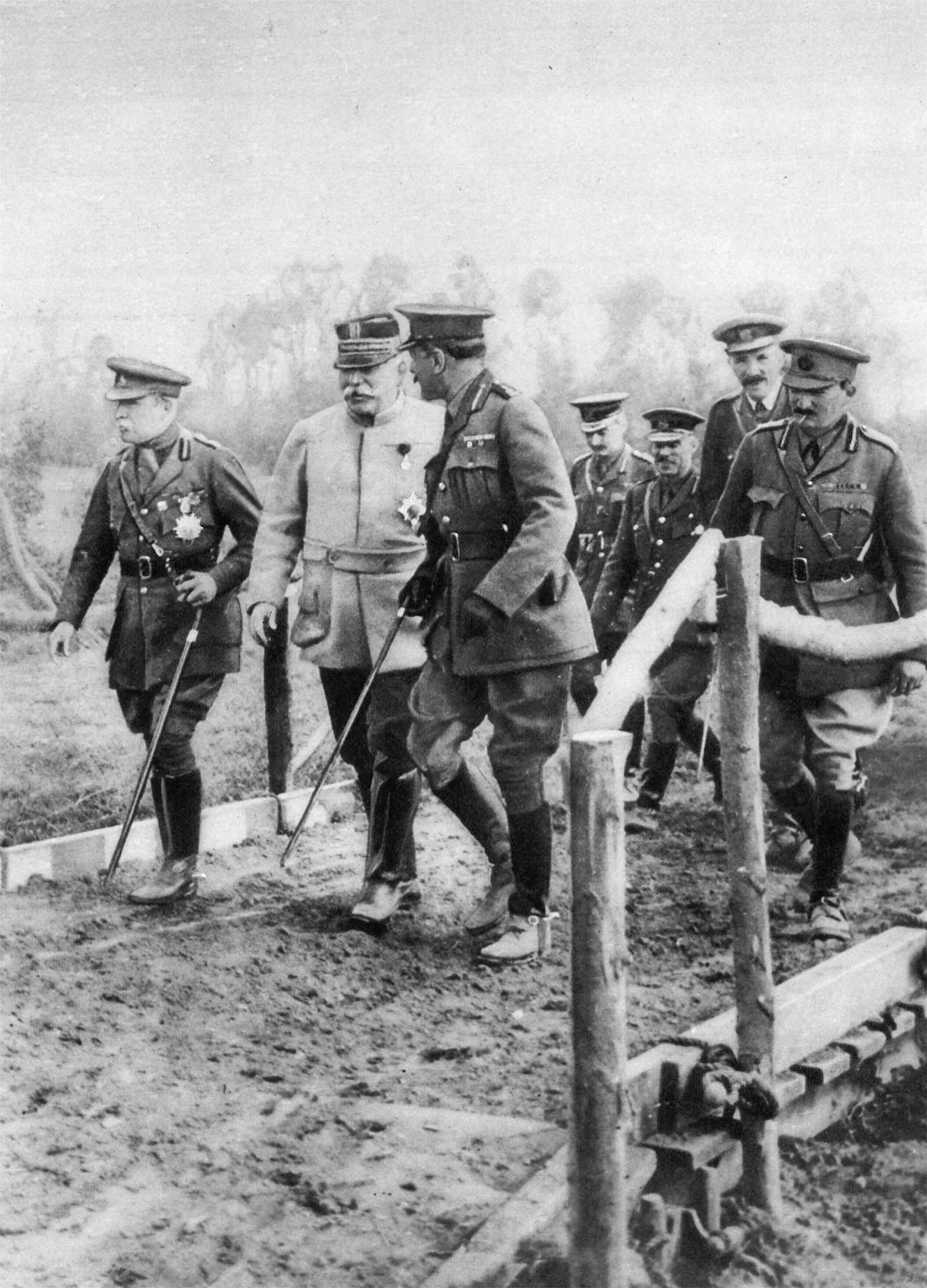
French, Joffre and Haig (left to right) visit the front line during 1915. Henry Wilson, responsible at the time for liaison between French and Joffre, is second from the right.

Joffre sent a letter of congratulation (26 September)—Clive sensed that Joffre did not really believe the British attack would succeed but wanted it kept going as a diversion from Champagne, although after complaints from Sir John that the French Tenth Army were not doing enough Foch ordered them to take over some line from the British around Loos. When the British reserves were ordered to attack on the second day (26 September), the advancing divisions found unbroken barbed wire and intact and ungassed German defences. The slaughter that day resulted in 7,861 British casualties without a single German casualty.

Sir John was still keen for a concerted Anglo-French attack, telling Foch (28 September) that a gap could be "rushed" just north of Hill 70, although Foch felt that this would be difficult to co-ordinate and Haig told him that First Army was not in a position for further attacks at the moment. Charteris wrote that "Sir John French is played out. The show is too big for him and he is despondent."

The Battle of Loos was a strategic and tactical failure and has become one of the epitomes of a Great War battle in which generals showed complete disregard for the situations on the front lines the soldiers were facing. With only 533 guns and a shortage of shells to cover a wide 11,200 yard front with two German trench lines to bombard, the British would likely be attacking positions that had not been disrupted enough to allow a breakthrough. The British commanders at this time did not grasp that German tactical doctrine called for the second line of machine gun nests to be situated on the reverse slope of their hillside defences; destroying them would need artillery with higher trajectories and shells with high explosives. By the time the Battle of Loos ended, around 8 October, the British suffered anywhere between 41,000 and 61,000 casualties, with most estimates for German casualties around 20,000.

==== Criticism after Loos ====
Criticism of French, especially for his slow release of the reserves on the first day (25 September), began to mount even while the battle was still under way. Haig wrote of French in his diary (2 October) "It seems impossible to discuss military problems with an unreasoning brain of this kind". Even French's trusted secretary Brinsley Fitzgerald recorded in his diary (5 October 1915) that French's "sudden moods are weird and marvellous but we never now even have explanations". Haig told Richard Haldane (9 October) that French's handling of the reserves had lost the battle. Kitchener demanded an explanation (11 October). Haig told Rawlinson (10 and 22 October 1915) he could no longer be loyal to French after Loos. Haig also wrote to GHQ (21 October) claiming that fresh forces could have pushed through with little opposition between 9 am and 11 am on the first day.

To French's annoyance the King arrived in France (21 October) to sample opinion for himself—French met him at Boulogne but was summoned to London for talks with Kitchener and the Dardanelles Committee. Gough and Haking visited the King after tea (24 October) and told him "everyone has lost confidence in the C-in-C" while over dinner that evening Haig told the King that French was "a source of great weakness to the Army, and no one had any confidence in him any more".

Robertson, visiting London in early October, had discussed French's replacement with Murray (now CIGS) and the King. After he returned to France and conferred with Haig, Haig recorded (diary 24 October) "I ha[ve] come to the conclusion that it [i]s not fair to the Empire to retain French in command. Moreover, none of my officers commanding corps had a high opinion of Sir John's military ability or military views; in fact they had no confidence in him. Robertson quite agreed and left me saying he knew how to act, and would report to Stamfordham". Robertson thought that French's "mind was never the same for two consecutive minutes" and that his ideas were "reckless and impossible" and that he had poor relations with Joffre.

==== Resignation ====
GHQ suggested that according to Haking's own report the reserves had been held up by "avoidable delay". Haig denied that there had been any "avoidable delay" and Haking changed his mind and sent a new report blaming the slowness of his troops' march on their inexperience. French's despatch was published (2 November) claiming that the reserves had been released at 9:30 am. Haig demanded amendments and another interview between French and Haig ensued. Even though Charteris doubted that the quicker arrival of the reserves would have made much difference, the dispute revolved around the deployment and release of the reserves. French's policies were attacked in the House of Lords on 9 and 16 November when John Philipps, 1st Viscount St Davids complained of "the presence of ladies" at GHQ.

Haig sent copies of the relevant orders and a critique of GHQ's conduct of the battle to his wife, who showed them to Stamfordham (10 November) for the King to see. Robertson was working against French, telling Haig (15 November) that "the first thing is to get you in command". The Prime Minister discussed the matter with the King and Kitchener (both of whom thought French not up to the job, although Kitchener thought the time not right for a change), and, on 23 November, Haig. Asquith then asked Reginald Brett, 2nd Viscount Esher to convey to French in person the news that he must resign, but that he was being offered a peerage and the newly created job of Commander-in-Chief, Home Forces. However, French insisted on seeing Asquith again (29 November) at which meeting Asquith told him that he must take the first step and that he was not being "recalled" (sacked). French's official critique of Haig's performance at Loos finally reached the War Office on 1 December. He wrote to Asquith suggesting that Kitchener be removed to be replaced by a civilian Secretary of State to avoid friction with the new job of Commander-in-Chief, Home Forces. French returned to France (3 December), but Asquith and Stamfordham agreed that French must now be pressed to quit. Walter Long telephoned French with the Prime Minister's message that he must resign.

Kitchener told Esher that the government intended to appoint Robertson Commander-in-Chief of the BEF, but Haig was appointed instead. French's resignation, recommending Robertson as successor, reached Asquith on the morning of 6 December. It was announced in the press on 17 December and took effect at noon on 18 December. French was cheered onto the boat home by an escort of 19th Hussars.

== Commander-in-Chief, Home Forces ==
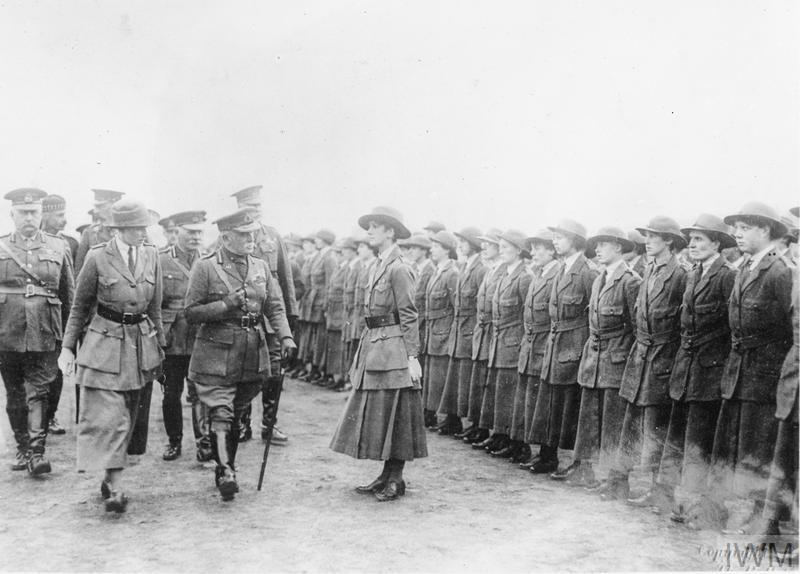
Field Marshal Lord John French inspects the Glasgow Battalion, Women's Volunteer Reserve, ca. 1915.

French returned to England to be appointed Commander-in-Chief, Home Forces in December 1915, and in January 1916, he was created Viscount French of Ypres and of High Lake in the County of Roscommon. Robertson prevented him having the same powers as the old Commander-in-Chief of the British Army or having a seat on the Army Council.

French's term of office saw the suppression in 1916 of the Easter Rising, which briefly coincided with a German invasion scare. An intelligence report on 21 April warned of collaboration between the Irish and the Germans. French received news of the insurrection at noon on 24 April 1916, and at once sent two infantry brigades to Ireland and put other formations on standby—the Admiralty warned that the German fleet was out. Woken at 4 am on 25 April with the news that the Germans were shelling Lowestoft, French ordered the commanders of the two Home Defence Armies to prepare for action. French rejected Kitchener's suggestion that he go to Ireland and take personal command, a decision with which the Prime Minister concurred. On the evening of 26 April, told that the government had decided to send out a new general to Ireland, French selected John Maxwell. On 27 April, French visited Robertson who agreed with him that to send more troops to Ireland would be "playing the German game". However, the next day after visits from St John Brodrick, 9th Viscount Midleton (on instructions from Asquith) and Edward Carson French agreed to send three extra battalions, as well as the cavalry brigade from Aldershot which Maxwell now requested. The rebellion was crushed by 29 April. On 3 May Asquith recorded his concerns that the shooting of rebels might antagonise Irish opinion, but French, despite having been advised by John Redmond that Sinn Féin had little support outside Dublin and that the Army should not use more than minimal force, passed on these concerns with the caveat that he would not interfere with Maxwell's actions. In the opinion of one biographer French's views had not moved on since his hanging of the Cape Colony Boers, and he bears some responsibility for the shootings.

French became increasingly critical of Haig's Western Front Offensives, particularly the choice of Rawlinson to command the Somme. In October 1916, Lloyd George (then War Secretary) sought French's advice about recent press criticism of British artillery and discipline, then sent him to France to sound out the opinion of the French generals about why the French had gained ground with fewer losses on the Somme. Foch (C-in-C French Army Group North) confessed to Wilson that Haig's methods invited criticism, and Haig refused to meet him. Haig and Robertson were both concerned that Lloyd George might appoint French CIGS in Robertson's place. On 25 November 1916 the King summoned French to Buckingham Palace and warned him to stop criticising Haig. In January 1917 French refused an invitation from Secretary of State for War Edward Stanley, 17th Earl of Derby to dine with Haig, but on 22 June, after pressure from the King, a meeting was arranged for French and Haig to bury the hatchet, at which, by Haig's account, French confessed that in his bitterness at being removed from command he had "said things then which he was ashamed of now". Haig, according to his own diary, congratulated him for "speaking out like a man" and they shook hands as they parted, but their rapprochement was short-lived.

French took on responsibility for air defence and was frequently lobbied by local groups for better air defences. In January 1917 anti-aircraft guns were reallocated to anti-submarine warfare. After the Gotha raids in July 1917 a War cabinet sub-committee was set up and French urged that air be treated as a separate department going forward (which eventually became the Royal Air Force). More guns and fighter squadrons were provided, and Brigadier E. B. Ashmore was appointed to command London's air defence, reporting to French.

In July 1917, French asked to advise the War Cabinet, aware that this was breaking the monopoly of advice on which Robertson insisted. On 11 October 1917, French and Wilson were invited to the War Cabinet. French's paper criticised GHQ's inflated estimates of German casualties compared to War Office figures, pointed out that there was no firm evidence that German losses were commensurate with Allied, and that any further Western Front Offensive "has become more of a 'gamble' than anything else we have undertaken" and that any future plans and forecasts by Haig should be most carefully examined. He recommended the "Pétain solution" (i.e. standing mainly on the defensive on the Western Front until the Americans arrived in force) and urged the creation of an Allied Supreme War Council. Maurice Hankey met French and Wilson on 24 October and urged them to reconsider, concerned that if Robertson resigned the Conservatives might bring down the government. French refused, saying Haig was "always making the same mistake" and "we shall do no good until we break down the Haig-Robertson ring". Hankey thought that "there was envy, hatred and malice in the old boy's heart as he spoke". Haig regarded French's paper as "the outcome of a jealous and disappointed mind".

Although French was responsible for training, the demands of the Western Front left him very short of fit troops. At the start of 1917 French had a defensive force of 470,000 men, of whom 232,459 were "mobile" reserves and 237,894 on beach and anti-aircraft defence. By January 1918 the total had been reduced to 400,979, of whom 190,045 were "mobile". There were around 600,000 Category "A" men in Britain, of whom 372,000 were sent to France between January and November 1918 when the government were doing all they could to reinforce the BEF—by May 1918 even troops with medical grade of B1 were sent to France. French's reputation had recovered and he had come to be regarded as one of the government's leading advisers. French was pleased at the removal of Robertson and Derby early in 1918, and during the German Spring Offensive urged that Haig be sacked and replaced by Plumer. In May 1918 he again suggested to Wilson (now CIGS) that Haig be appointed his successor as Commander-in-Chief, Home Forces.

== Lord Lieutenant of Ireland ==
=== 1918 ===
French noted that Irish divisions could no longer be kept up to strength by voluntary recruitment. In March 1918, when the Cabinet planned to extend conscription to Ireland, French claimed that "opinion was about evenly divided" on the issue, and thought it would cause opposition but not "bloodshed". In the event the threat of Irish conscription provoked great opposition and contributed to the growth in support for Sinn Féin.

Lloyd George intended to replace the Lord Lieutenant—normally something of a figurehead position—with three "Justices": James Campbell, St John Brodrick, 9th Viscount Midleton and French himself. The three met on 30 April 1918 and jointly demanded immediate conscription and martial law in Ireland. When Lloyd George refused, Campbell declined any further involvement; Lloyd George also dropped Midleton when the latter demanded the right to "advise on policy". French eventually accepted appointment as sole Lord Lieutenant in May 1918 on condition it was as a "Military Viceroy at the Head of a Quasi-Military Government". French also arranged for Shaw, his chief of staff at Horse Guards, to replace Mahon as Commander-in-Chief, Ireland and that Irish Command should become a separate command, rather than under Home Forces.

French also set up an Executive Council and a Military Council to which senior officers of the Royal Irish Constabulary (RIC) and Dublin Metropolitan Police (DMP) were sometimes invited. He also set up an Advisory Council, with the support of the King, Haldane and Carson, which he hoped might contain representatives of all strands of Irish opinion but in practice its members were all well-connected wealthy men. Sinn Féin were not involved despite Haldane's hopes and the proposal angered the existing administrators at Dublin Castle. The body provided useful advice on commercial and industrial questions, and advised that Home Rule could work as a federation of separate assemblies in Belfast and Dublin (also French's view), but ceased to meet regularly after April 1919.

French was convinced that the Sinn Féin leaders had little support amongst the majority of the Irish people. He wanted Home Rule to be implemented, provided the violence was stopped first. In 1917 he had bought a country house at Drumdoe in Frenchpark, County Roscommon, but in practice was seldom able to visit the place as the situation in Ireland deteriorated.

On the night of 17/18 May 1918 French had Sinn Féin leaders arrested and documents were seized, but even supporters like Repington and Macready were disappointed at the lack of clear evidence of collaboration with the Germans and the flimsy legal grounds for the arrests. Michael Collins and Cathal Brugha escaped arrest and increased their own power in the vacuum created by the arrest of more moderate leaders.

The Irish Volunteers and Sinn Féin were proclaimed "dangerous organisations" in certain areas. French obtained a cash bonus for Irish policemen, and pressed for them to receive decorations. He also came down hard on senior Irish police officers whom he thought useless, threatening resignation unless the Inspector-General of the RIC, Brigadier-General Joseph Byrne, was removed.

French, who like many generals of his generation believed that the government owed a moral duty to those who had served, urged that a "Comrades of the Great War (Ireland)" be set up to prevent returning Irish war veterans joining the Sinn Féin-dominated "Soldiers' Federation"; he also recommended that soldiers be given cash and land grants. This plan was stymied by cash shortage and inter-departmental infighting.

=== 1919 ===
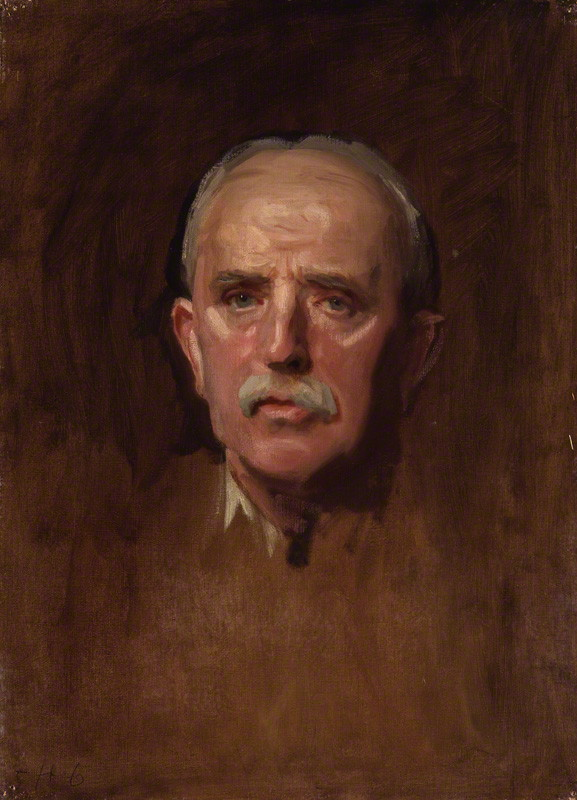
John French, 1st Earl of Ypres c. 1919 by John Singer Sargent

French clashed with the Chief Secretary Edward Shortt over his insistence that he exercise executive authority in Dublin, and when Lloyd George formed a new government in January 1919 Shortt was replaced by Ian Macpherson. French was appointed to the British Cabinet.

French secured the appointment of Sir James Macmahon as Under-Secretary at Dublin Castle. Macmahon was Catholic, which caused Walter Long and to some extent, French himself concerns that this would increase the power of the Church hierarchy over Irish government. In practice Macmahon was frozen out of decision-making by Macpherson while French was ill with pneumonia between February and April 1919, and despite warnings from French of administrative chaos at Dublin Castle it was not until 1920 that the highly able John Anderson was appointed as Joint Under-Secretary with Macmahon.

The shooting deaths of two Catholic constables of the RIC in an ambush at Soloheadbeg (21 January 1919) caused French to call off tentative talks between Haldane and the recently elected Irish Dáil. French and Macpherson wanted Sinn Féin declared illegal and pressed for a free hand to deal with the militants, although the issue received little priority while Lloyd George was at Versailles in early 1919. Sinn Féin was declared illegal on 5 July 1919 after District Inspector Hunt was killed in broad daylight, in Thurles (23 June). By October 1919 French was urging martial law. By December he was furious at the government's lack of support.

Shaw was sceptical about the legality of martial law and thought it might be impractical in cities like Dublin and Cork. French was advised that 15 army battalions and 24 cycle units (half a battalion in size) were needed to keep order, but British strength did not reach these levels until the summer of 1920. In November 1919, Irish Command listed its minimum requirement as 25,000 "bayonet strength"—at the time there were just over 37,000 troops in Ireland, many of them non-combatants. Even in January 1920 only 34 battalions were available, rather than the 36 required. British military strength in Ireland reached 51 battalions during the martial law period early in 1921.

IRA intimidation caused traditional RIC sources of information to dry up. By late 1919, with French's approval, the RIC was recruiting in England: first the "Black and Tans", then the Auxiliary Division (ex-army officers with the powers of police sergeants) from July 1920.

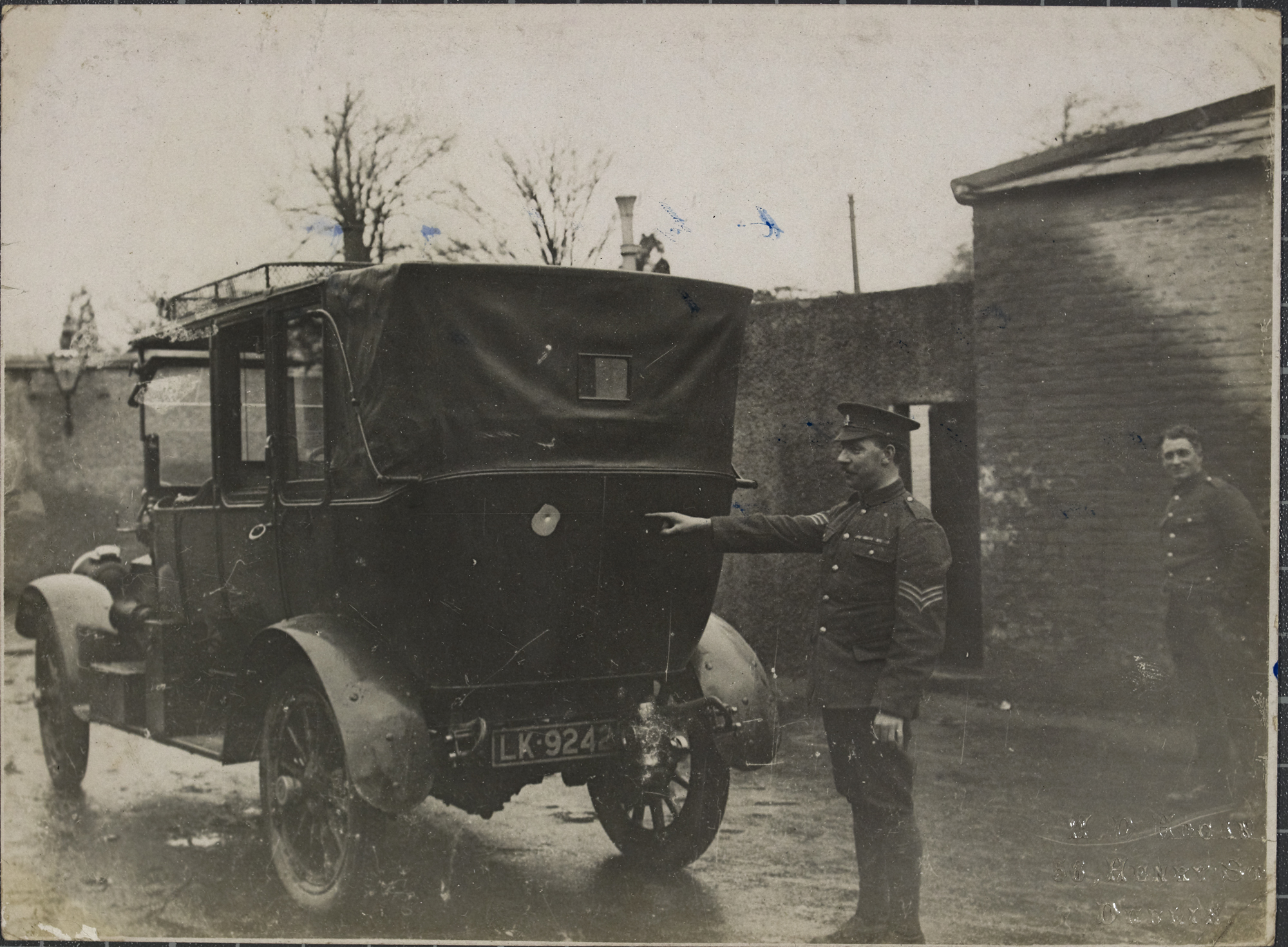
A sergeant pointing out the bullet hole resulting from the IRA ambush, December 1919

French had been receiving death threats since January 1919, which he believed were a sign that government measures were having an effect. On 19 December 1919 a group of eleven IRA men, including Seán Treacy, Seamus Robinson, Seán Hogan, Paddy Daly, Joe Leonard, Martin Savage and Dan Breen, sought to ambush and kill French as he returned from Ashtown railway station to the Vice-Regal Lodge in Phoenix Park, Dublin. Savage, Kehoe and Breen were interrupted by a RIC officer as they pushed a hay-cart halfway across the road blocking the path of French's car. He was dragged off the road after one of them lobbed a grenade at him, which did not go off but knocked him unconscious. When French's car convoy appeared minutes later the IRA unit focused their attack upon the second car on the basis of incorrect intelligence: French was actually in the first car. In the ensuing crossfire, Breen was hit in the leg and Savage was killed by a bullet in the neck. French's bodyguard was wounded, and he was saved in part by the quick thinking of his driver. A grenade, which would almost certainly have killed him, exploded in the back seat of the second car.

The Cabinet agreed that the Irish Government could impose martial law whenever it pleased, although in the event this did not happen for almost another year, by which time executive authority had been returned to London. Suspects could now be interned under Defence of the Realm Act 1914 s. 14B on warrants signed by the Chief Secretary and French pressed Macpherson, who had been shocked by the attempted assassination, to intern as many as possible, although he advised against interning politicians like Arthur Griffith "simply for making seditious speeches".

=== Final period ===
Political support from London for internment wavered. French opposed the release of hunger strikers under the "Cat and Mouse" Act and wanted them simply left to die, but in April 1920, under pressure from London, they were paroled.

French lost a good deal of executive power as substantial control over Irish affairs was given back to a new Chief Secretary, Hamar Greenwood, in April 1920. French again urged the introduction of martial law in Ireland and the use of Ulster Volunteers as peacekeepers in Southern Ireland. Wilson and Macready expected French to be sacked in the spring of 1920. Wilson wrote: "Poor little man he is so weak and pliable and then has such inconsequential gusts of illogical passion".

French had supported the use of armoured cars and aircraft in Ireland. By June 1920 the military situation had escalated considerably and French suggested that they should be permitted to strafe and bomb freely into areas from which civilians had been removed.

French resigned as Lord Lieutenant of Ireland on 30 April 1921 and was replaced by Lord Edmund Talbot, a Catholic.

== Honorary positions ==
French was president of The Ypres League, a veterans' society for those who had served at the Ypres Salient. He was also colonel of the 19th Hussars from 14 February 1902 (retaining this position when French persuaded Wilson to amalgamate them with the 15th to become the 15th/19th The King's Royal Hussars), colonel of the 1st Battalion, the Cambridgeshire Regiment from 22 April 1909 and colonel-in-chief of the Royal Irish Regiment from 26 March 1913, succeeding Wolseley. The Royal Irish Regiment was disbanded along with the four other Southern Irish regiments, in 1922. He was Colonel of the Irish Guards from June 1916.

== Memoirs ==
Stung by press attacks in February 1917, French published his memoirs 1914, ghosted by the journalist Lovat Fraser, in April and May 1919. The unauthorised publication technically laid him open to prosecution as he was Lord Lieutenant of Ireland at the time. The King was angered, and Bonar Law warned French that the government could not defend him if the House of Commons demanded his resignation. Haig, Asquith and Bertie complained of inaccuracies and it was attacked by Sir John Fortescue as "one of the most unfortunate books ever written". Smith-Dorrien called 1914 "mostly a work of fiction and a foolish one too".

French left an uncompleted autobiography, which was used by Gerald French in his 1931 life of his father. In 1972 the ownership of French's war diaries was disputed following the bankruptcy of the 3rd Earl of Ypres.

== Retirement ==
French retired from the British Army in April 1921 and was elevated to the Earldom of Ypres in June 1922.

Drumdoe was looted early in 1923, for which French received an apology and a promise of an armed guard for the place from Governor-General Timothy Michael Healy. Despite a gift of £50,000 in 1916, and receiving field marshal's half pay, owning two properties in Ireland which he could not use left French again short of money, although he did not improve matters by staying often at the Hôtel de Crillon in Paris. He left £8,450 (net total) in his will.

French lived at 94 Lancaster Gate, London, which provided a useful base for his amorous activities, on which he often embarked together with a wealthy American friend, George Moore. In August 1923 William Lygon, 7th Earl Beauchamp offered him the honorary post of Captain of Deal Castle, which gave him a home in Britain once again.

== Death ==
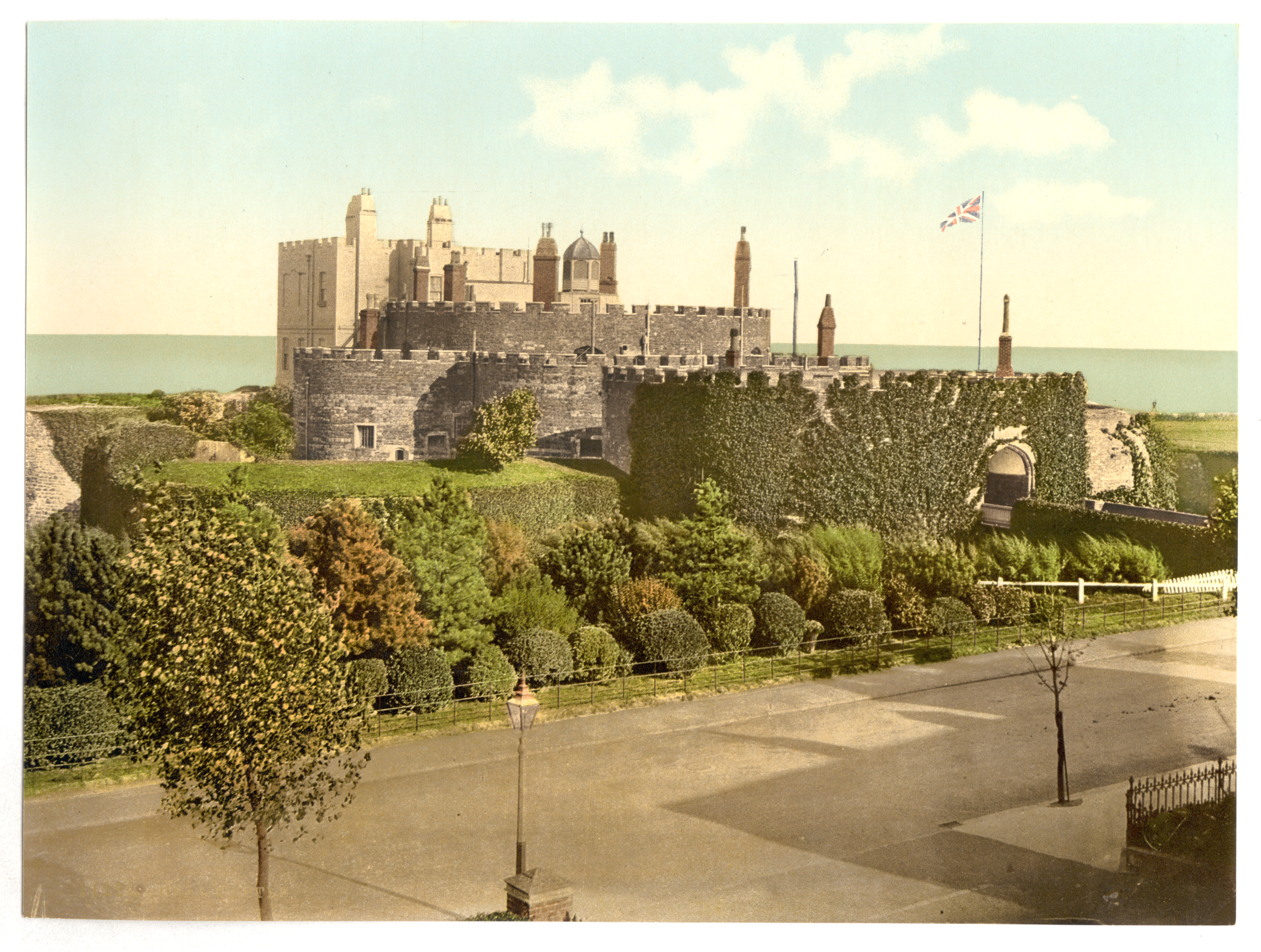
Deal Castle at the end of the 19th century; at the rear are the Captain's Quarters, where French died in 1925 and which were destroyed in 1943

French died from bladder cancer at Deal Castle on 22 May 1925. On 25 May, his body was taken to London for cremation at Golders Green Crematorium. The ashes remained overnight in the Guards' Chapel, Wellington Barracks, until the funeral service at Westminster Abbey in the evening of 26 May. After the service, the ashes were escorted by a military procession to Victoria Station.

The procedure of burying ashes in an urn was still unfamiliar at the time, and it was transported in a coffin during the funeral ceremonies. An estimated 7,000 people filed past the coffin during the first two hours it lay in state. Haig, Robertson, Hamilton and Smith-Dorrien were pall bearers at the funeral at Westminster Abbey – the first of a major First World War leader. The ashes were buried in a private service in the graveyard of St. Mary the Virgin Church at Ripple, Kent, five days after his death.

== Assessments ==
=== Contemporaries ===
French was "a man about whom there were extremes of opinion, ranging from loyalty and affection to disgust". He had a hot temper and swings of mood, would address friends effusively as "dear old boy", and was a womaniser and often short of money. He wore an unusually long tunic which emphasised his relatively short stature. He was—at least during the Boer War—idolised by the public and during the First World War was loved by his men in a way that Douglas Haig never was. French was also an avid reader of Dickens, from whose works he was able to recite long passages from memory.

Opinions vary as to French's military abilities. Edward Spears, then a subaltern liaising between French and Lanrezac, later wrote of the former:

You only had to look at him to see that he was a brave, determined man ... I learnt to love and to admire the man who never lost his head, and on whom danger had the effect it has on the wild boar: he would become morose, furious for a time, harsh, but he would face up and never shirk. He knew only one way of dealing with a difficulty, and that was to tackle it ... If he had once lost confidence in a man, justly or unjustly, that man could do no right in his eyes. He was as bad an enemy as he was a good friend ... once he had lost confidence in (Lanrezac) he ignored him and acted as if he and his Army did not exist.

Spears also recorded that at a conference with Joffre on 30 August 1914 French, the back of his tunic wet with sweat from riding hard to reach the meeting, was "one of the coolest and calmest people at GHQ". This was at the time when he had decided that the BEF would have to retreat behind the Seine to refit.

French was severely criticised by those close to Haig, including General Sir Hubert Gough, who thought him "an ignorant little fool" (in a letter of 29 January 1916; he was more charitable in his 1954 memoirs Soldiering On (p. 127)) and Duff Cooper in Haig's official biography. The Official Historian James Edward Edmonds called him "only 'un beau sabreur' of the old fashioned sort—a vain, ignorant and vindictive old man with an unsavoury society backing" and claimed that French once borrowed Sir Edward Hamley's Operations of War from the War Office library but could not understand it. His admiring biographer Cecil Chisholm (1914) claimed that as a young officer French had had a reputation as a reader of military books (Antoine-Henri Jomini, Karl von Schmidt), a claim treated with some scepticism by Holmes, although Beckett uses it to cast doubt on Edmonds' "magnificently malicious" story, pointing out that he remembered enough of Hamley's doctrines not to take shelter in Maubeuge after the Battle of Mons, although Spears later wrote that had Hamley not employed such a penetrating metaphor it might not have lodged in French's mind. During his time in command in France his subordinates recognised him as a poor worker with a constant stream of guests, while General Smith-Dorrien remarked that there were "Too many whores around your headquarters, Field-Marshal!"

General Macready (in 1919) thought French "one of the most lovable men I have ever met ... one of the most loyal and true-hearted individuals you are ever likely to come across". Field Marshal Philip Chetwode, reflecting on the hostility between Haig and his former patron French, wrote that "French was a man who loved life, laughter and women ... a man who might have done big things in open warfare. He was a lucky general and inspired the greatest confidence in his troops" and that Haig was his opposite in most of these respects. Churchill (in Great Contemporaries) wrote that French was "a natural soldier" who lacked Haig's attention to detail and endurance, but who had "deeper military insight" and "would never have run the British army into the same long drawn-out slaughters". Seely and Esher thought highly of him. Haldane thought he had "been a great Commander-in-Chief, a soldier of the first order, who held the Army as no other could". Lloyd George praised him as "a far bigger man" than Haig and regretted that he "had fallen by the daggers of his own colleagues", although perhaps as an ally against Haig in 1916–1918.

=== Modern historians ===
French was ridiculed as "weak-willed" by Alan Clark in the widely read The Donkeys (1961). His modern biographer Richard Holmes wrote that "he remains ... a discredited man" with whom "history has dealt too harshly". He argues that French was an emotional man who was deeply moved by casualties and identified too closely with his soldiers, even in August 1914. Holmes quotes with approval John Terraine's verdict that French was the most distinguished English cavalry leader since Oliver Cromwell, and argues that although he did not achieve victory, his personality inspired the BEF in 1914. Holmes acknowledges that French's qualities were marred by his "undisciplined intellect and mercurial personality", but concludes by quoting Churchill's verdict that "French, in the sacred fire of leadership, was unsurpassed".

Brian Bond described French as "a brave fighting general who proved out of his professional depths" in 1914–15. Ian Senior offers a critical view of French in 1914: although he was "essentially a generous and warm-hearted man" as seen in his pre-Marne meeting with Joffre, his

excitable temperament, uncertain judgement based on rumour and personal experience and his tendency to over-exaggerate problems did not suit him to be in command of the army. At best, his more questionable decisions led to a lack of support for his ally at critical moments in the campaign; at worst, they threatened to wreck Joffre's carefully laid plans for the counteroffensive.

Senior is critical of his vetoing – out of excessive concern to avoid BEF losses – of Haig's orders to attack on 29 August, his decision to pull the BEF out of the line on 30 August, only a few hours after promising to assist Fifth Army by delaying his retreat, and his countermanding of Haig's order to advance on 9 September. He also criticises him for his lack of any realistic appraisal of the state of II Corps after Le Cateau, and "lack of urgency" in advance at the Marne, and writes that French would not have cooperated without the "brutal" intervention of Lord Kitchener.

Max Hastings is even less kind, arguing that French used his instructions from Kitchener (to husband the strength of the BEF and to avoid major engagements without French participation unless given Cabinet authority) as an excuse for "pusillanimity". He criticises him for lack of "grip" and for "moral collapse" during the retreat after Le Cateau, and describes him as "a poltroon", although also pointing out that his failings were no worse than those of many French and German generals in that campaign.

Richard Holmes argues that French had no consistency in his strategic ideas, as was shown at the War Council in August 1914 when he proposed deploying the BEF to Antwerp. Ian Beckett does not wholly agree with Holmes, arguing that French was consistent in December 1914 – January 1915 in wanting to promote what he saw as Britain's strategic interests by deploying Territorial and New Army Divisions in an offensive along the Belgian Coast to seize Zeebrugge, although he also remarks that such plans were not unique to French, as they continued to find favour with Haig in 1916–17, and that French's hopes for amphibious landings in the Baltic or North Sea had little practicality at this stage.

In his memoirs 1914 French wrote "no previous experience ... had led me to anticipate a war of positions. All my thoughts ... were concentrated upon a war of movement." Although French's memoirs are often unreliable this passage is confirmed by what he wrote to Lt-Gen Edward Hutton in December 1914 that the war had become "a siege ... on a gigantic scale". Ian Beckett argues that in this respect, and in his recognition of the importance of artillery as early as the Battle of the Aisne in September 1914, French's tactical views were "marginally more flexible" than those of Haig, who continued to nurse hopes of breakthrough and decisive victory until several years later.

== Personal life and family ==
In 1875, French married Isabella Soundy, the daughter of a tradesman. Subalterns of that era were not expected to marry and French's first marriage may well have been kept secret from his regiment: his regiment is recorded incorrectly on the marriage certificate as "12th Hussars", which did not exist at the time. They divorced in 1878 with Isabella as a co-respondent and said to have been paid off by French's wealthy brother-in-law, John Lydall. The divorce could have ruined his career if widely known. Lydall had already paid off French's debts on a previous occasion, and later broke off relations with him when he attempted to borrow money again.

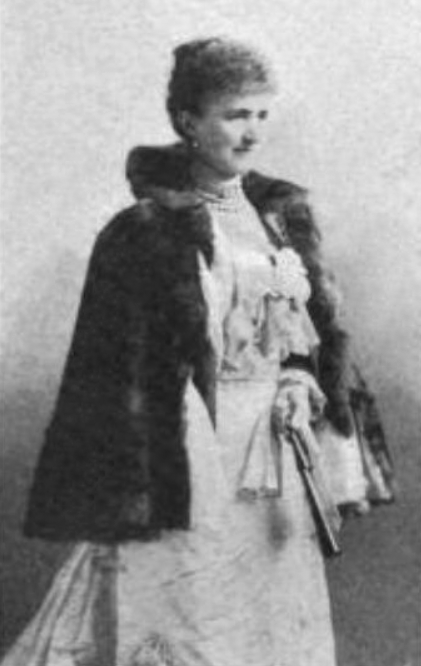
Eleanora Anna Selby-Lowndes in 1902

French married Eleanora Selby-Lowndes in 1880. His first son John Richard Lowndes was born in Northumberland in 1881. A daughter was accidentally suffocated by her nurse in 1882. His second son Gerald was born in December 1883. Neither Eleanore, nor his daughter Essex (born late 1886, died 1979), were ever aware of his first marriage. As Inspector-General in the Edwardian period French appears to have been largely separated from his wife, but she appears to have still loved him. In 1905, French purchased 20 Park Mansions from Watt as a base in London. He met George Moore, a wealthy American, in about 1909 and in 1910 they took a large house together at 94 Lancaster Gate as a base for partying and womanising. Eleanore did not accompany him to Ireland (officially, as it was too dangerous).

From 1922, French re-established relations with his son Gerald, who began writing to defend his father's reputation in the 1930s, and his last publication was The French-Kitchener Dispute: A Last Word in 1960. Gerald French died in 1970.

Beginning in January 1915 French had an affair with Mrs Winifred Bennett, the wife of a British diplomat. French wrote to her almost daily, sometimes signing himself "Peter Pan" and on the eve of Neuve Chapelle he wrote to her, "Tomorrow I shall go forward with my war cry of 'Winifred'". She was tall and elegant, and the disparity in their heights caused great amusement.

French had six sisters. One sister, Katherine Harley, by then a widow, led a group of British nurses on the Salonika front and was killed by shellfire at Monastir in March 1917. Another sister was the suffragette, anti-war campaigner and Irish nationalist Sinn Féin member Charlotte Despard.

== Honours and arms ==
=== Honours ===
British

- Viscountcy as Viscount French (1916)
- Earldom as Earl of Ypres (1922)
- Knight of the Order of St Patrick (1917)
- Knight Grand Cross of the Order of the Bath (1909)
- Member of the Order of Merit (1914)
- Knight Grand Cross of the Royal Victorian Order (1907)
- Knight Commander of the Order of St Michael and St George (1902)
- Member of His Majesty's Most Honourable Privy Council (1918)
- Honorary Freedom of the City of Canterbury – 26 August 1902
- Honorary Freedom of the borough of Bedford – 9 October 1902
- Honorary Freedom of the City of Leeds – 6 November 1902
- Honorary Freedom of the borough of Brighton – 14 January 1903
- Honorary Freedom of the borough of Cambridge – 20 January 1903
- Honorary Freedom and livery of the Worshipful Company of Cutlers, with a sword of honour – 28 July 1902 – "in recognition of his distinguished services in the War in South Africa".
- Honorary Freedom and livery of the Worshipful Company of Salters – 13 November 1902
- Honorary Freedom and livery of the Worshipful Company of Haberdashers – 18 February 1903

Others

- Knight 1st class Order of the Red Eagle of Prussia – during his September 1902 visit to Germany to attend German Army manoeuvres.
- Croix de guerre of France – 22 February 1916
- Grand Cordon of the Order of Leopold of Belgium – 24 February 1916
- Order of St. George of Russia, 3rd Class – 16 May 1916
- Grand Cross of the Order of Saints Maurice and Lazarus of the Kingdom of Italy – 26 May 1917
- First Class of the Order of the Star of Karađorđe with Swords of the Kingdom of Serbia – 10 September 1918
- Grand Cordon of the Order of the Rising Sun with Paulownia Flowers of the Empire of Japan – 9 November 1918
- Commemorated by memorials in Ypres Cathedral and Canterbury Cathedral.

=== Arms ===
Coat of arms of John French, 1st Earl of Ypres
Coronet A Coronet of an Earl Crest A Dolphin embowed proper. Escutcheon Ermine, a Chevron Sable, a Crescent for difference. Supporters Dexter: A Lion guardant Or, supporting a Staff proper, with a Banner of the Union. Sinister: A Lion Or, supporting a Staff proper, with a Banner paly of three Sable, Gold and Gules. Motto MALO MORI QUAM FŒDARI (I prefer to die than to be dishonoured)

== In popular culture ==
After the Colesberg Operations (early 1900) the following verse was published about him:

There's a general of 'orse which is French,
You've 'eard of 'im o' course, fightin' French,
'E's a daisy, e's a brick, and e's up to every trick,
And 'e moves amazin' quick, don't yer French?
'E's so tough and terse
'E don't want no bloomin' nurse
and 'E ain't had one reverse
Ave yer, French?

During the Boer War, the press lionised him as "Uncle French" and "the shirt-sleeved general".

Field Marshal French was played by Laurence Olivier in Richard Attenborough's World War I satire film Oh! What A Lovely War (1969). Ian Beckett writes that French and Wilson are portrayed almost as "a comic duo" in the film. By this time, although Terraine's Mons: Retreat to Victory (1960), Alan Clark's The Donkeys (1961), and A. J. Smithers' The Man Who Disobeyed (a 1970 biography of Smith-Dorrien) kept up some interest in French, he was already becoming a somewhat forgotten figure as popular interest from the 1960s onwards concentrated on the Battle of the Somme, inevitably focussing attention on Douglas Haig.

In Russian the word french (френч), a type of four-pocketed military tunic, is named after John French.

== See also ==
- Army Manoeuvres of 1913
- Christmas truce
- Gheluvelt Park – a public park in Worcester, which he opened on 17 June 1922
- Saint George's Memorial Church, Ypres
- Mount French, a mountain in Canada named after him

== Notes ==
Military offices
Preceded by Sir Redvers Buller	GOC-in-C Aldershot Command; 1902–1907	Succeeded by Sir Horace Smith-Dorrien
Preceded by The Duke of Connaught	Inspector-General of the Forces; 1907–1912	Succeeded by Sir Charles Douglas; As Inspector-General of Home Forces
Preceded by Sir William Nicholson	Chief of the Imperial General Staff; 1912–1914	Succeeded by Sir Charles Douglas
New title Outbreak of war	Commander-in-Chief, British Expeditionary Force; 1914–1915	Succeeded by Sir Douglas Haig
Preceded by Sir Leslie Rundle; As C-in-C Home Army	Commander-in-Chief, Home Forces; 1915–1918	Succeeded by Sir William Robertson
Political offices
Preceded by The Lord Wimborne	Lord Lieutenant of Ireland; 1918–1921	Succeeded by The Viscount Fitzalan of Derwent
Peerage of the United Kingdom
New creation	Earl of Ypres; 1922–1925	Succeeded by John French
New creation	Viscount French; 1916–1925	Succeeded by John French
