= List of knights and dames grand cross of the Order of the Bath =

This is an incomplete list of those whio were made knights and dames grand cross of the Order of the Bath from the date of the Order's structural change by the Prince Regent on behalf of his father, King George III, on 2 January 1815. Knights/Dames Grand Cross use the post-nominal GCB. Those Knights living at the time of the reorganisation of the Order automatically became Knights Grand Cross, with the post-nominal GCB. Appointees are listed with their style at the time of appointment.

== Knights and dames grand cross ==
=== George III ===
| Image | Name | Date | Notes | References |
|---|---|---|---|---|
| | Field Marshal H.R.H. The Prince Frederick Augustus, Duke of York and Albany, KG, KB, PC | 2 January 1815 | Military division | |
| | Admiral John Jervis, 1st Earl of St Vincent, KB, PC, RN | 2 January 1815 | Military division | |
| | General Sir Robert Abercromby, KB | 2 January 1815 | Military division | |
| | Admiral George Keith Elphinstone, 1st Viscount Keith, KB, RN | 2 January 1815 | Military division | |
| | Admiral Sir John Borlase Warren, Bt., KB, RN | 2 January 1815 | Military division | |
| | General Sir Alured Clarke, KB | 2 January 1815 | Military division | |
| | Admiral Sir John Colpoys, KB | 2 January 1815 | Military division | |
| | General Sir John Hely-Hutchinson, commonly called Lord Hutchinson, KB | 2 January 1815 | Military division | |
| | Admiral Sir John Thomas Duckworth, Bt., KB, RN | 2 January 1801 | Military division | |
| | Admiral Sir James Saumarez, KB, RN | 2 January 1815 | Military division | |
| | General Sir Eyre Coote, KB | 2 January 1815 | Military division | |
| | General Sir John Francis Cradock, KB | 2 January 1815 | Military division | |
| | General Sir David Dundas, KB | 2 January 1815 | Military division | |
| | Field Marshal His Grace Arthur Wellesley, 1st Duke of Wellington, KG, KB, PC | 2 January 1815 | Military division | |
| | General George James Ludlow, 3rd Earl Ludlow, KB | 2 January 1815 | Military division | |
| | Admiral William Carnegie, 7th Earl of Northesk, KB, RN | 2 January 1815 | Military division | |
| | Vice-Admiral Sir Richard John Strachan, Bt., KB, RN | 2 January 1815 | Military division | |
| | Vice-Admiral Sir Alexander Inglis Cochrane, KB, RN | 2 January 1815 | Military division | |
| | Lieutenant-General Sir John Stuart, KB | 2 January 1815 | Military division | |
| | Vice-Admiral Sir Richard Goodwin Keats, KB, RN | 2 January 1815 | Military division | |
| | General Sir David Baird, 1st Baronet, KB | 2 January 1815 | Military division | |
| | General Sir George Beckwith, KB | 2 January 1815 | Military division | |
| | Lieutenant-General John Hope, Lord Niddry, KB | 2 January 1815 | Military division | |
| | Lieutenant-General Sir Brent Spencer, KB | 2 January 1815 | Military division | |
| | Lieutenant-General Sir John Coape Sherbrooke, KB | 2 January 1815 | Military division | |
| | Lieutenant-General William Carr Beresford, 1st Baron Beresford, KB | 2 January 1815 | Military division | |
| | Lieutenant-General Thomas Graham, 1st Baron Lynedoch, KB | 2 January 1815 | Military division | |
| | Lieutenant-General Rowland Hill, 1st Baron Hill, KB | 2 January 1815 | Military division | |
| | Lieutenant-General Sir Samuel Auchmuty, KB | 2 January 1815 | Military division | |
| | Lieutenant-General Sir Edward Paget, KB | 2 January 1815 | Military division | |
| | Lieutenant-General Stapleton Cotton, 1st Baron Combermere, KB | 2 January 1815 | Military division | |
| | Admiral Sir George Cranfield Berkeley, KB, RN | 2 January 1815 | Military division | |
| | General Sir George Nugent, 1st Baronet, KB | 2 January 1815 | Military division | |
| | General Sir William Keppel, KB | 2 January 1815 | Military division | |
| | Lieutenant-General Sir John Doyle, 1st Baronet, KB | 2 January 1815 | Military division | |
| | Lieutenant-General Lord William Cavendish-Bentinck, KB | 2 January 1815 | Military division | |
| | Lieutenant-General Sir James Leith, KB | 2 January 1815 | Military division | |
| | Lieutenant-General Sir Thomas Picton, KB | 2 January 1815 | Military division | |
| | Lieutenant-General Sir Galbraith Lowry Cole, KB | 2 January 1815 | Military division | |
| | Lieutenant-General Charles William Stewart, 1st Baron Stewart, KB | 2 January 1815 | Military division | |
| | Lieutenant-General Sir Alexander Hope, KB | 2 January 1815 | Military division | |
| | Lieutenant-General Sir Henry Clinton, KB | 2 January 1815 | Military division | |
| | Lieutenant-General George Ramsay, 9th Earl of Dalhousie, KB | 2 January 1815 | Military division | |
| | Lieutenant-General Sir William Stewart, KB | 2 January 1815 | Military division | |
| | Major-General Sir George Murray, KB | 2 January 1815 | Military division | |
| | Major General Sir Edward Pakenham, KB | 2 January 1815 | Military division | |
| | Colonel H.H. William Frederick Henry of Nassau, Prince of Orange | 2 January 1815 | Military division, honorary | |
| | Admiral of the Fleet H.R.H. The Prince William Henry, Duke of Clarence and St. Andrews, KG, KT, PC | 2 January 1815 | Military division | |
| | Field Marshal H.R.H. The Prince Edward Augustus, Duke of Kent and Strathearn, KG, KP, PC | 2 January 1815 | Military division | |
| | Field Marshal H.R.H. The Prince Ernest Augustus, Duke of Cumberland and Teviotdale, KG, KT, PC | 2 January 1815 | Military division | |
| | Field Marshal H.R.H. The Prince Adolphus Frederick, Duke of Cambridge, KG, PC | 2 January 1815 | Military division | |
| | Field Marshal H.R.H. Prince William Frederick, Duke of Gloucester and Edinburgh, KG, PC | 2 January 1815 | Military division | |
| | Admiral Samuel Hood, 1st Viscount Hood, RN | 2 January 1815 | Military division | |
| | Admiral Sir Richard Onslow, Bt., RN | 2 January 1815 | Military division | |
| | Admiral William Cornwallis, RN | 2 January 1815 | Military division | |
| | Admiral William Waldegrave, 1st Baron Radstock, RN | 2 January 1815 | Military division | |
| | Admiral Sir Roger Curtis, Bt., RN | 2 January 1815 | Military division | |
| | Admiral George Montagu, RN | 2 January 1815 | Military division | |
| | Lieutenant-General Henry William Paget, 2nd Earl of Uxbridge | 2 January 1815 | Military division | |
| | General Sir Robert Brownrigg, Bt. | 2 January 1815 | Military division | |
| | Lieutenant-General Sir Harry Calvert, 1st Baronet, GCB, GCH | 2 January 1815 | Military division | |
| | Lieutenant-General The Rt. Hon. Thomas Maitland | 2 January 1815 | Military division | |
| | General William Henry Clinton | 2 January 1815 | Military division | |
| | Sir Robert Gunning, Bt., KB | 2 January 1815 | Civil division | |
| | James Harris, 1st Earl of Malmesbury, KB, PC | 2 January 1815 | Civil division | |
| | Morton Frederick Eden, 1st Baron Henley, KB, PC | 2 January 1815 | Civil division | |
| | Charles Whitworth, 1st Baron Whitworth, KB, PC | 2 January 1815 | Civil division | |
| | Sir Joseph Banks, Bt., KB | 2 January 1815 | Civil division | |
| | The Rt. Hon. Sir Arthur Paget, KB | 2 January 1815 | Civil division | |
| | Sir Philip Francis, KB | 2 January 1815 | Civil division | |
| | Sir George Hilaro Barlow, Bt., KB | 2 January 1815 | Civil division | |
| | Percy Clinton Sydney Smythe, 6th Viscount Strangford, KB | 2 January 1815 | Civil division | |
| | The Hon. Sir Henry Wellesley, KB | 2 January 1815 | Civil division | |
| | The Hon. Sir Charles Stuart, KB | 2 January 1815 | Civil division | |
| | Richard Le Poer Trench, 2nd Earl of Clancarty | 1 April 1815 | Civil division | |
| | Lieutenant General Sir John Abercromby, KCB | 7 April 1815 | Military division | |
| | Major-General the Hon. Sir Charles Colville, KCB | 7 April 1815 | Military division | |
| | Admiral James Gambier, 1st Baron Gambier, KCB, RN | 7 June 1815 | Military division | |
| | Major-General Sir James Kempt, KCB | 22 June 1815 | Military division | |
| | Field Marshal Karl Philipp, Prince of Schwarzenberg | 18 August 1815 | Military division, honorary | |
| | Field Marshal Gebhard Leberecht von Blücher | 18 August 1815 | Military division, honorary | |
| | Field Marshal Michael Andreas Barclay de Tolly | 18 August 1815 | Military division, honorary | |
| | Field Marshal Karl Philipp von Wrede | 18 August 1815 | Military division, honorary | |
| | H.R.H. William Frederick Charles, Crown Prince of Württemberg | 18 August 1815 | Military division, honorary | |
| | Admiral Edward Pellew, 1st Baron Exmouth, KCB, RN | 16 March 1816 | Military division | |
| | General Leopold George Frederick, Duke of Saxony, Prince of Saxe-Coburg-Saalfeld | 23 May 1816 | Military division | |
| | Sir Robert Liston | 21 October 1816 | Civil division | |
| | Major-General Sir David Ochterlony, 1st Baronet, KCB | 10 December 1816 | Military division | |
| | Lieutenant-General Sir Gordon Drummond, KCB | 7 January 1817 | Military division | |
| | Major-General Sir George Townshend Walker, Bt., KCB | 11 March 1817 | Military division | |
| | Admiral Sir Charles Morice Pole, Bt., KCB, RN | 20 February 1818 | Military division | |
| | Vice-Admiral Sir Thomas Francis Fremantle, KCB, RN | 20 February 1818 | Military division | |
| | Rear-Admiral Sir George Cockburn, KCB, RN | 20 February 1818 | Military division | |
| | Lieutenant-General Sir Thomas Hislop, Bt., KCB | 14 October 1818 | Military division | |
| | General Pyotr Volkonsky | 17 April 1819 | Military division, honorary | |
| | General Mikhail Semyonovich Vorontsov | 17 April 1819 | Military division, honorary | |
| | General Hans Ernst Karl, Graf von Zieten | 17 April 1819 | Military division, honorary | |
| | General Johann Maria Philipp Frimont | 17 April 1819 | Military division, honorary | |
| | Sir William à Court, Bt. | 20 October 1819 | Civil division | |
| | Major-General Sir John Malcolm, KCB | 20 November 1819 | Military division | |

=== George IV ===
| Image | Name | Date | Notes | References |
|---|---|---|---|---|
| | Lieutenant-General Kenneth Alexander Howard, 12th Baron Howard of Effingham, KCB | 17 March 1820 | Military division | |
| | Admiral Sir William Domett, KCB, RN | 16 May 1820 | Military division | |
| | Vice-Admiral Sir Thomas Foley, KCB, RN | 16 May 1820 | Military division | |
| | General William Harcourt, 3rd Earl Harcourt | 16 May 1820 | Military division | |
| | Admiral Sir Benjamin Caldwell, KCB, RN | 16 May 1820 | Military division | |
| | Admiral Sir Richard Rodney Bligh, RN | 16 May 1820 | Military division | |
| | General Sir Henry Johnson, Bt. | 16 May 1820 | Military division | |
| | General Henry Phipps, 1st Earl of Mulgrave, PC | 16 May 1820 | Military division | |
| | Admiral Sir Charles Henry Knowles, Bt., RN | 16 May 1820 | Military division | |
| | Admiral The Hon. Sir Thomas Pakenham, KCB, RN | 16 May 1820 | Military division | |
| | General George Harris, 1st Baron Harris | 16 May 1820 | Military division | |
| | General Sir Banastre Tarleton, Bt. | 16 May 1820 | Military division | |
| | General The Rt. Hon. Sir George Hewett, Bt. | 16 May 1820 | Military division | |
| | General Sir George Don | 20 May 1820 | Military division | |
| | General James St Clair-Erskine, 2nd Earl of Rosslyn | 20 May 1820 | Military division | |
| | General George Gordon, Marquess of Huntly | 20 May 1820 | Military division | |
| | Lieutenant-General Charles Gregan Craufurd | 20 May 1820 | Military division | |
| | Lieutenant-General Sir Hildebrand Oakes, Bt. | 20 May 1820 | Military division | |
| | Sir Charles Long | 20 May 1820 | Civil division | |
| | Sir Charles Bagot | 20 May 1820 | Civil division | |
| | Admiral Sir George Campbell, KCB, RN | 8 June 1820 | Military division | |
| | General Charles, Count Alten | 12 August 1820 | Military division, honorary | |
| | Vice-Admiral Sir George Martin, KCB, RN | 23 February 1821 | Military division | |
| | The Rt. Hon. Edward Thornton | 8 March 1822 | Civil division | |
| | Major-General the Rt. Hon. Sir Benjamin Bloomfield | 1 April 1822 | Civil division | |
| | Vice-Admiral Sir Thomas Boulden Thompson, Bt., KCB, RN | 14 September 1822 | Military division | |
| | Vice-Admiral Sir Harry Burrard Neale, Bt., KCB, RN | 14 September 1822 | Military division | |
| | Lieutenant-General Sir John Oswald, KCB | 25 February 1824 | Military division | |
| | Admiral Sir Edward Thornbrough, KCB, RN | 11 January 1825 | Military division | |
| | Admiral Sir Eliab Harvey, KCB, RN | 11 January 1825 | Military division | |
| | Granville Leveson-Gower, 1st Viscount Granville PC | 1 May 1825 | Civil division | |
| | Vice-Admiral Sir William Johnstone Hope, KCB, RN | 4 October 1825 | Military division | |
| | Lieutenant-General Sir Henry Fane, KCB | 24 January 1826 | Military division | |
| | Major-General Sir Archibald Campbell, Bt., KCB | 26 December 1826 | Military division | |
| | Vice-Admiral Sir Edward Codrington, KCB, RN | 13 November 1827 | Military division | |
| | The Rt. Hon. Frederick James Lamb | 13 December 1827 | Civil division | |
| | The Rt. Hon. Sir Stratford Canning | 7 December 1829 | Civil division | |
| | The Rt. Hon. Sir Robert Gordon | 7 December 1829 | Civil division | |
| | Vice-Admiral Sir Thomas Byam Martin, KCB, RN | 3 March 1830 | Military division | |

=== William IV ===
| Image | Name | Date | Notes | References |
|---|---|---|---|---|
| | H.H. Prince Bernhard of Saxe-Weimar-Eisenach | 22 July 1830 | Military division, honorary | |
| | Admiral Sir James Hawkins-Whitshed, Bt., KCB, RN | 17 November 1830 | Military division | |
| | Admiral Sir Philip Charles Henderson-Durham, KCB, RN | 17 November 1830 | Military division | |
| | Count Ernst Friedrich Herbert zu Münster | 16 February 1831 | Civil division, honorary | |
| | Lieutenant-General Sir William Houston, Bt., KCB | 24 February 1831 | Military division | |
| | Lieutenant-General Sir Edward Barnes, KCB | 24 February 1831 | Military division | |
| | Admiral Sir Henry Trollope, KCB, RN | 19 May 1831 | Military division | |
| | Admiral The Hon. Sir Robert Stopford, RN | 6 June 1831 | Military division | |
| | Admiral Sir Benjamin Hallowell Carew, KCB, RN | 6 June 1831 | Military division | |
| | Lieutenant-General Sir John Byng | 6 June 1831 | Military division | |
| | The Rt. Hon. Sir Robert Adair | 3 August 1831 | Civil division | |
| | General The Hon. Sir Henry George Grey | 13 September 1831 | Military division | |
| | General Sir Ronald Craufurd Ferguson | 13 September 1831 | Military division | |
| | General Sir Henry Warde, KCB | 13 September 1831 | Military division | |
| | Admiral Sir Thomas Williams, KCB, RN | 13 September 1831 | Military division | |
| | Admiral Sir William Hargood, RN | 13 September 1831 | Military division | |
| | Lieutenant-General The Hon. Sir William Lumley | 13 September 1831 | Military division | |
| | Lieutenant-General Sir James Willoughby Gordon | 13 September 1831 | Military division | |
| | Rear-Admiral Sir Thomas Masterman Hardy, 1st Baronet | 13 September 1831 | Military division | |
| | Henry Temple, 3rd Viscount Palmerston, PC | 6 June 1832 | Civil division | |
| | Admiral Sir Davidge Gould | 24 January 1833 | Military division | |
| | Admiral Sir Charles Tyler | 29 January 1833 | Military division | |
| | Vice-Admiral Sir Pulteney Malcolm | 24 April 1833 | Military division | |
| | Lieutenant-General Sir George Anson | 29 July 1833 | Military division | |
| | Lieutenant-General Sir John Ormsby Vandeleur | 29 July 1833 | Military division | |
| | Lieutenant-General Sir Thomas Dallas | 1 August 1833 | Military division | |
| | Charles Manners-Sutton | 31 August 1833 | Civil division | |
| | John Ponsonby, 2nd Baron Ponsonby | 3 March 1834 | Civil division | |
| | Lieutenant-General Sir Herbert Taylor | 16 April 1834 | Military division | |
| | Field Marshal H.I.R.H. Archduke Charles of Austria | 23 May 1834 | Military division, honorary | |
| | Lieutenant-General Ludwig von Wallmoden-Gimborn | 19 August 1834 | Military division, honorary | |
| | Gilbert Elliot-Murray-Kynynmound, 2nd Earl of Minto, PC | 16 September 1834 | Civil division | |
| | Admiral Sir John Wells | 6 October 1834 | Military division | |
| | Lieutenant-General Lord Robert Edward Henry Somerset | 17 October 1834 | Military division | |
| | Lieutenant-General Sir William Henry Pringle | 19 December 1834 | Military division | |
| | Lieutenant-General The Hon. Sir Edward Stopford | 28 March 1835 | Military division | |
| | Admiral Lord Amelius Beauclerk, RN | 3 August 1835 | Military division | |
| | Lieutenant-General H.H. Prince Ernest Frederick of Hesse-Philippsthal-Barchfeld | 29 August 1835 | Military division, honorary | |
| | George Eden, 2nd Baron Auckland, PC | 29 August 1835 | Civil division | |
| | The Rt. Hon. Sir Charles Theophilus Metcalfe, Bt. | 12 September 1835 | Civil division | |
| | Vice-Admiral Sir Graham Moore | 11 March 1836 | Military division | |
| | General H.H. Louis William, Landgrave of Hesse-Homburg | 11 June 1836 | Military division | |
| | Lieutenant-General Matthew Whitworth-Aylmer, 5th Baron Aylmer | 10 September 1836 | Military division | |
| | Lieutenant-General Sir Thomas Makdougall Brisbane, Bt., GCH, KCB | 6 February 1837 | Military division | |
| | Admiral Sir Lawrence William Halsted | 24 February 1837 | Military division | |
| | Lieutenant-General Sir John Doveton | 10 March 1837 | Military division | |
| | Lieutenant-General Sir Richard Hussey Vivian, Bt. | 30 May 1837 | Military division | |

=== Victoria ===
| Image | Name | Date | Notes | References |
|---|---|---|---|---|
| | John Lambton, 1st Earl of Durham, PC | 27 June 1837 | Civil division | |
| | Prince Paul Anton Esterházy | 12 July 1837 | Civil division, honorary | |
| | George William Frederick Villiers, Esq. | 19 October 1837 | Civil division | |
| | Prince Augustus Frederick, Duke of Sussex, KG, KT, GCH, PC | 15 December 1837 | Civil division | |
| | Lieutenant-General Sir John Colborne | 29 January 1838 | Military division | |
| | Lieutenant-General Sir Thomas Bradford | 15 February 1838 | Military division | |
| | Major-General Sir Henry Worsley | 16 February 1838 | Military division | |
| | Lieutenant-General Sir Frederick Philipse Robinson | 20 April 1838 | Military division | |
| | Admiral Sir William Sidney Smith | 19 July 1838 | Military division | |
| | Lieutenant-General Sir John Lambert | 19 July 1838 | Military division | |
| | Lieutenant-General the Hon. Sir Robert William O'Callaghan | 19 July 1838 | Military division | |
| | Archibald Acheson, 2nd Earl of Gosford, PC | 19 July 1838 | Civil division | |
| | Colonel Lord George William Russell, CB | 19 July 1838 | Civil division | |
| | Charles Augustus Ellis, 6th Baron Howard de Walden and 2nd Baron Seaford | 19 July 1838 | Civil division | |
| | Major-General Sir Alexander Caldwell | 20 July 1838 | Military division | |
| | Major-General Sir James Law Lushington | 20 July 1838 | Military division | |
| | Richard Jenkins, Esq. | 20 July 1838 | Civil division | |
| | Major-General Sir Alexander Dickson | 23 July 1838 | Military division | |
| | John McNeill, Esq. | 15 April 1839 | Civil division | |
| | Prince Ferdinand George Augustus of Saxe-Coburg and Gotha | 12 June 1839 | Military division, honorary | |
| | Lieutenant-General Sir John Keane | 12 August 1839 | Military division | |
| | Admiral Sir Henry William Bayntun | 25 October 1839 | Military division | |
| | Major-General Sir Willoughby Cotton | 21 January 1840 | Military division | |
| | Field Marshal H.R.H. Prince Albert of Saxe-Coburg and Gotha | 6 March 1840 | Military division | |
| | Lieutenant-General the Rt. Hon. Sir Frederick Adam | 20 June 1840 | Military division | |
| | Lieutenant-General Sir Benjamin D'Urban | 20 June 1840 | Military division | |
| | Lieutenant-General Sir Andrew Francis Barnard | 20 June 1840 | Military division | |
| | Admiral Sir William Hotham | 4 July 1840 | Military division | |
| | Admiral Sir Josias Rowley, Bt. | 4 July 1840 | Military division | |
| | Vice-Admiral Sir Charles Rowley, Bt. | 4 July 1840 | Military division | |
| | Vice-Admiral Sir David Milne | 4 July 1840 | Military division | |
| | General Baldomero Espartero | 20 July 1840 | Military division, honorary | |
| | Major-General Sir Joseph O'Halloran | 12 February 1841 | Military division | |
| | Charles Poulett Thomson, 1st Baron Sydenham, PC | 19 August 1841 | Civil division | |
| | Lieutenant-General Sir Howard Douglas, Bt. | 27 August 1841 | Civil division | |
| | Lieutenant-General Sir Lionel Smith, Bt., KCB | 27 August 1841 | Civil division | |
| | Major-General Hugh Gough | 14 October 1841 | Military division | |
| | Admiral the Hon. Sir John Talbot | 23 February 1842 | Military division | |
| | Admiral Sir Robert Barlow | 23 February 1842 | Military division | |
| | Admiral Sir Henry Digby | 23 February 1842 | Military division | |
| | Lieutenant-General Emmanuel von Mensdorff-Pouilly | 30 May 1842 | Military division | |
| | Colonel Sir Robert Henry Sale | 16 June 1842 | Military division | |
| | H.I.R.H. Archduke Franz Karl of Austria | 5 November 1842 | Military division, honorary | |
| | Vice-Admiral Sir William Parker | 2 December 1842 | Military division | |
| | Major-General George Pollock | 2 December 1842 | Military division | |
| | Major-General William Nott | 2 December 1842 | Military division | |
| | Major-General Sir Henry Pottinger, Bt. | 2 December 1842 | Civil division | |
| | Major-General Sir Charles James Napier | 4 July 1843 | Military division | |
| | H.R.H. Prince Friedrich William Karl of Prussia | 18 August 1843 | Military division, honorary | |
| | Arthur Ingram Aston, Esq. | 10 November 1843 | Civil division | |
| | Lieutenant-General Sir Henry Hardinge, KCB | 1 July 1844 | Civil division | |
| | Captain Sir Edmund Lyons, RN | 10 July 1844 | Civil division | |
| | Edward Law, 1st Earl of Ellenborough, PC | 30 October 1844 | Civil division | |
| | Admiral Sir Robert Waller Otway, Bt. | 8 May 1845 | Military division | |
| | Vice-Admiral Sir Edward William Campbell Rich Owen | 8 May 1845 | Military division | |
| | Charles Cecil Cope Jenkinson, 3rd Earl of Liverpool, PC | 11 December 1845 | Civil division | |
| | Colonel Sir Henry George Wakelyn Smith | 7 April 1846 | Military division | |
| | Lieutenant-General John Fane, 11th Earl of Westmorland, GCH, KCB, PC | 24 June 1846 | Civil division | |
| | H.R.H. Prince Waldemar of Prussia | 10 November 1846 | Military division | |
| | Sir George Hamilton Seymour, GCH | 28 January 1847 | Civil division | |
| | Vice-Admiral Thomas Cochrane, 10th Earl of Dundonald | 22 May 1847 | Military division, honour restored | |
| | Lieutenant-General Lord FitzRoy James Henry Somerset | 17 September 1847 | Military division | |
| | Lieutenant-General Sir John Macdonald | 17 September 1847 | Military division | |
| | Constantine Henry Phipps, 1st Marquess of Normanby, GCH, PC | 10 December 1847 | Civil division | |
| | General Sir Colin Halkett | 30 December 1847 | Military division | |
| | H.S.H. Ernst Christian Charles, Prince of Hohenlohe-Langenburg | 22 January 1848 | Civil division | |
| | H.H. Frederick William, Hereditary Grand Duke of Mecklenburg-Strelitz | 22 January 1848 | Civil division | |
| | Major-General Sir John Hunter Littler | 31 January 1848 | Military division | |
| | Sir James Lillyman Caldwell | 25 August 1848 | Military division | |
| | The Rt. Hon. Sir George Grey, Bt. | 31 March 1849 | Civil division | |
| | Lieutenant-General Sir Edward Blakeney | 7 May 1849 | Military division | |
| | Major-General Sir Joseph Thackwell | 5 June 1849 | Military division | |
| | Major-General Sir Walter Raleigh Gilbert | 5 June 1849 | Military division | |
| | Sir William Henry Lytton Earle Bulwer, KCB | 1 March 1851 | Civil division | |
| | John Cam Hobhouse, 1st Baron Broughton, PC, FRS | 23 February 1852 | Civil division | |
| | Admiral Sir Charles Ekins | 6 April 1852 | Military division | |
| | General Sir Peregrine Maitland | 6 April 1852 | Military division | |
| | Admiral the Hon. Sir Thomas Bladen Capel | 6 April 1852 | Military division | |
| | Lieutenant-General Sir Alexander George Woodford | 6 April 1852 | Military division | |
| | Lieutenant-General Sir Henry Frederick Bouverie | 6 April 1852 | Military division | |
| | Vice-Admiral Sir Charles Bullen | 6 April 1852 | Military division | |
| | Lieutenant-General Sir John Fox Burgoyne | 6 April 1852 | Military division | |
| | Henry Richard Charles Wellesley, 2nd Baron Cowley, KCB, PC | 21 February 1853 | Civil division | |
| | The Rt. Hon. Sir James Robert George Graham, Bt. | 15 April 1854 | Civil division | |
| | Field Marshal H.H. Omar Pasha | 12 August 1854 | Military division, honorary | |
| | Lieutenant-General Sir George Brown | 5 July 1855 | Military division | |
| | Vice-Admiral James Whitley Deans Dundas | 5 July 1855 | Military division | |
| | Lieutenant-General H.R.H. Prince George, 2nd Duke of Cambridge, KG, KP, GCH, GCMG, PC | 5 July 1855 | Military division | |
| | Lieutenant-General Sir George de Lacy Evans | 5 July 1855 | Military division | |
| | Lieutenant-General Sir Richard England | 5 July 1855 | Military division | |
| | Lieutenant-General Sir Colin Campbell | 5 July 1855 | Military division | |
| | Rear-Admiral Sir Edmund Lyons, Bt. | 5 July 1855 | Military division | |
| | Admiral Sir Graham Eden Hamond, KCB, RN | 5 July 1855 | Military division | |
| | Admiral Sir James Alexander Gordon, KCB, RN | 5 July 1855 | Military division | |
| | General Sir James Macdonell | 5 July 1855 | Military division | |
| | General Sir Hew Dalrymple Ross | 5 July 1855 | Military division | |
| | General François Certain de Canrobert | 5 September 1855 | Military division, honorary | |
| | H.I.H. Prince Napoleon | 5 September 1855 | Military division, honorary | |
| | Marshal Jean-Baptiste Philibert Vaillant | 16 October 1855 | Military division, honorary | |
| | General James Simpson | 16 October 1855 | Military division | |
| | General Alfonso Ferrero La Marmora | 25 October 1855 | Military division, honorary | |
| | Fox Maule, 2nd Baron Panmure, KT, PC | 29 October 1855 | Civil division | |
| | Marshal Aimable Pélissier | 12 November 1855 | Military division, honorary | |
| | General Pierre Bosquet | 3 January 1856 | Military division, honorary | |
| | General Charles Marie Joseph Marius de Salles | 3 January 1856 | Military division, honorary | |
| | General Patrice de MacMahon | 3 January 1856 | Military division, honorary | |
| | General Auguste Regnaud de Saint-Jean d'Angély | 3 January 1856 | Military division, honorary | |
| | General Louis Michel Morris | 3 January 1856 | Military division, honorary | |
| | The Rt. Hon. Sir Charles Wood, Bt. | 19 June 1856 | Civil division | |
| | H.R.H. Prince Frederick William Louis of Prussia | 1 January 1857 | Military division, honorary | |
| | Edward Granville Eliot, 3rd Earl of St. Germans, PC | 24 January 1857 | Civil division | |
| | Admiral Ferdinand-Alphonse Hamelin | 7 May 1857 | Military division, honorary | |
| | Lieutenant-General Sir James Outram | 30 July 1857 | Military division | |
| | Sir John Laird Mair Lawrence, KCB | 11 November 1857 | Civil division | |
| | Major-General John Hobart Caradoc, 2nd Baron Howden, KCB | 5 March 1858 | Civil division | |
| | Major-General Sir Hugh Henry Rose | 6 July 1858 | Military division | |
| | H.H. Maharaja Jung Bahadur Rana | 6 July 1858 | Military division | |
| | John Arthur Douglas Bloomfield, 2nd Baron Bloomfield, KCB | 3 September 1858 | Civil division | |
| | James Bruce, 8th Earl of Elgin and 12th Earl of Kincardine, KT, PC | 28 September 1858 | Civil division | |
| | Charles John Canning, 2nd Viscount Canning, PC | 31 March 1859 | Civil division | |
| | John Elphinstone, 13th Lord Elphinstone, GCH, PC | 31 March 1859 | Civil division | |
| | Rear-Admiral Sir Michael Seymour, KCB, RN | 20 May 1859 | Military division | |
| | James Howard Harris, 3rd Earl of Malmesbury, PC | 15 June 1859 | Civil division | |
| | The Rt. Hon. Sir John Somerset Pakington, Bt. | 15 June 1859 | Civil division | |
| | General Sir Thomas McMahon, Bt. | 21 June 1859 | Military division | |
| | General Charles Murray Cathcart, 2nd Earl Cathcart | 21 June 1859 | Military division | |
| | General Sir William Maynard Gomm | 21 June 1859 | Military division | |
| | General Sir Robert William Gardiner | 21 June 1859 | Military division | |
| | Admiral Sir John West, KCB, RN | 18 May 1860 | Military division | |
| | Admiral Sir William Hall Gage | 18 May 1860 | Military division | |
| | Admiral Sir Francis Austen, KCB | 18 May 1860 | Military division | |
| | Admiral Sir Thomas John Cochrane | 18 May 1860 | Military division | |
| | Admiral Sir George Francis Seymour, GCH, KCB, RN | 18 May 1860 | Military division | |
| | Admiral Sir James Dawes Douglas | 18 May 1860 | Military division | |
| | General Sir George Scovell | 18 May 1860 | Military division | |
| | General Ulysses Burgh, 2nd Baron Downes | 18 May 1860 | Military division | |
| | General Sir Frederick Stovin | 18 May 1860 | Military division | |
| | General Sir James Fergusson | 18 May 1860 | Military division | |
| | General Sir John Bell | 18 May 1860 | Military division | |
| | Lieutenant-General Sir Charles Yorke | 29 June 1860 | Military division | |
| | Lieutenant-General Sir James Hope Grant | 9 November 1860 | Military division | |
| | Major-General Sir Patrick Grant | 1 March 1861 | Military division | |
| | General Sir Arthur Benjamin Clifton | 28 June 1861 | Military division | |
| | Admiral Sir Phipps Hornby | 28 June 1861 | Military division | |
| | General Sir James Archibald Hope | 28 June 1861 | Military division | |
| | General Sir Thomas William Brotherton | 28 June 1861 | Military division | |
| | General Sir Samuel Benjamin Auchmuty | 28 June 1861 | Military division | |
| | Admiral Sir Barrington Reynolds | 28 June 1861 | Military division | |
| | General Sir Thomas Willshire | 28 June 1861 | Military division | |
| | Vice-Admiral the Rt. Hon. Sir Maurice Frederick FitzHardinge Berkeley | 28 June 1861 | Military division | |
| | Lieutenant-General Sir Harry David Jones | 28 June 1861 | Military division | |
| | Richard Bickerton Pemell Lyons, 2nd Baron Lyons, KCB | 24 January 1862 | Civil division | |
| | General Sir John Wright Guise, Bt. | 10 November 1862 | Military division | |
| | General Sir John Forster FitzGerald | 10 November 1862 | Military division | |
| | Admiral Anthony Maitland, 10th Earl of Lauderdale | 10 November 1862 | Military division | |
| | Admiral Sir Edward Tucker | 10 November 1862 | Military division | |
| | John Robert Townshend, 3rd Viscount Sydney, KCB | 10 March 1863 | Civil division | |
| | H.M. Christian IX, King of Denmark | 20 March 1863 | Civil division | |
| | Sir James Hudson, KCB | 11 August 1863 | Civil division | |
| | Major-General Sir Henry Knight Storks, GCMG, KCB | 1 July 1864 | Civil division | |
| | Field Marshal Albert Edward, Prince of Wales, KG, KSI, PC | 10 February 1865 | Military division | |
| | The Hon. Sir Frederick William Adolphus Bruce | 17 March 1865 | Civil division | |
| | Admiral Sir Edward Harvey | 28 March 1865 | Military division | |
| | Admiral Sir Fairfax Moresby | 28 March 1865 | Military division | |
| | General Sir William Rowan | 28 March 1865 | Military division | |
| | Admiral Sir Houston Stewart | 28 March 1865 | Military division | |
| | General Sir William John Codrington | 28 March 1865 | Military division | |
| | General Sir George Augustus Wetherall | 28 March 1865 | Military division | |
| | Admiral Sir Henry Ducie Chads | 28 March 1865 | Military division | |
| | General Sir James Frederick Love | 28 March 1865 | Military division | |
| | General Sir James Jackson | 28 March 1865 | Military division | |
| | Lieutenant-General Sir John Cheape | 28 March 1865 | Military division | |
| | Lieutenant-General Henry Dundas, 3rd Viscount Melville | 28 March 1865 | Military division | |
| | Vice-Admiral the Hon. Sir Frederick William Grey | 28 March 1865 | Military division | |
| | Vice-Admiral Sir James Hope | 28 March 1865 | Military division | |
| | H.H. Muhammad III as-Sadiq, Bey of Tunis | 1 June 1865 | Civil division, honorary | |
| | Admiral Sir George Robert Lambert | 7 June 1865 | Military division | |
| | The Rt. Hon. Sir Robert Peel, Bt. | 5 January 1866 | Civil division | |
| | Captain H.S.H. Ernest Leopold, Prince of Leiningen, KCB, RN | 29 January 1866 | Civil division | |
| | H.S.H. Prince Francis Paul Charles Louis Alexander of Teck | 12 June 1866 | Civil division, honorary | |
| | Sir Andrew Buchanan, KCB | 6 July 1866 | Civil division | |
| | Lord Augustus William Frederick Spencer Loftus, KCB | 6 July 1866 | Civil division | |
| | Sir Arthur Charles Magenis, KCB | 6 July 1866 | Civil division | |
| | H.H. Isma'il Pasha, Khedive of Egypt | 18 December 1866 | Civil division, honorary | |
| | Admiral Sir Stephen Lushington | 13 March 1867 | Military division | |
| | Lieutenant-General Sir John Lysaght Pennefather | 13 March 1867 | Military division | |
| | Lieutenant-General Sir Richard Airey, KCB | 13 March 1867 | Military division | |
| | Admiral Sir Charles Howe Fremantle | 13 March 1867 | Military division | |
| | Major-General Sir Archdale Wilson, Bt. | 13 March 1867 | Military division | |
| | Lieutenant-General Sir Edward Lugard | 13 March 1867 | Military division | |
| | General Sir John Aitchison | 13 March 1867 | Military division | |
| | General the Hon. Sir Charles Stephen Gore | 13 March 1867 | Military division | |
| | General George Hay, 8th Marquess of Tweeddale, KT, KCB | 13 March 1867 | Military division | |
| | H.S.H. Hermann, Prince of Hohenlohe-Langenburg | 8 May 1867 | Civil division, honorary | |
| | Lieutenant-General Sir Robert Cornelis Napier | 27 April 1868 | Military division | |
| | The Rt. Hon. Sir John Young, Bt., GCMG, KCB | 13 November 1868 | Civil division | |
| | Admiral Sir Henry Prescott | 2 June 1869 | Military division | |
| | General George Charles Bingham, 3rd Earl of Lucan | 2 June 1869 | Military division | |
| | General Sir Richard James Dacres | 2 June 1869 | Military division | |
| | Lieutenant-General the Hon. Sir James Yorke Scarlett | 2 June 1869 | Military division | |
| | Lieutenant-General Sir George Buller | 2 June 1869 | Military division | |
| | Vice-Admiral Sir Augustus Leopold Kuper | 2 June 1869 | Military division | |
| | The Rt. Hon. Henry George Elliot | 22 November 1869 | Civil division | |
| | Lieutenant-General Sir William Rose Mansfield | 14 May 1870 | Military division | |
| | Admiral the Hon. Sir Henry Keppel | 20 May 1871 | Military division | |
| | General Sir William Fenwick Williams, Bt. | 20 May 1871 | Military division | |
| | Admiral Sir Alexander Milne | 20 May 1871 | Military division | |
| | General Robert John Hussey Vivian | 20 May 1871 | Military division | |
| | Lieutenant-General Sir John Michel | 20 May 1871 | Military division | |
| | Lieutenant-General Lord William Paulet | 20 May 1871 | Military division | |
| | Admiral Sir Sydney Colpoys Dacres | 20 May 1871 | Military division | |
| | Robert Vernon, 1st Baron Lyveden, PC | 13 July 1872 | Civil division | |
| | Sir Henry Francis Howard, KCB | 13 July 1872 | Civil Division | |
| | Sir Alexander James Edmund Cockburn, Bt., QC | 12 February 1873 | Civil division | |
| | General Sir Henry George Andrew Taylor | 24 May 1873 | Military division | |
| | General Sir George Bowles | 24 May 1873 | Military division | |
| | Admiral Sir Provo William Parry Wallis | 24 May 1873 | Military division | |
| | Admiral Sir William Fanshawe Martin, Bt. | 24 May 1873 | Military division | |
| | General Sir Abraham Roberts | 24 May 1873 | Military division | |
| | General Sir James Charles Chatterton, Bt. | 24 May 1873 | Military division | |
| | Admiral Thomas Maitland, 11th Earl of Lauderdale | 24 May 1873 | Military division | |
| | Admiral Sir Lewis Tobias Jones | 24 May 1873 | Military division | |
| | General Sir William Henry Elliott | 24 May 1873 | Military division | |
| | Lieutenant-General Sir Sydney John Cotton, KCB | 24 May 1873 | Military division | |
| | Lieutenant-General Sir John Bloomfield | 24 May 1873 | Military division | |
| | Lieutenant-General Sir Duncan Alexander Cameron | 24 May 1873 | Military division | |
| | Lord Odo William Leopold Russell | 21 February 1874 | Civil division | |
| | General Sir Thomas Reed | 29 May 1875 | Military division | |
| | General Henry Montagu, 6th Baron Rokeby | 29 May 1875 | Military division | |
| | General Sir John Bloomfield Gough | 29 May 1875 | Military division | |
| | General Sir Charles Thomas van Straubenzee | 29 May 1875 | Military division | |
| | Lieutenant-General the Hon. Sir Augustus Almeric Spencer | 29 May 1875 | Military division | |
| | Vice-Admiral Sir Hastings Reginald Yelverton | 29 May 1875 | Military division | |
| | Lieutenant-General Sir Charles Shepherd Stuart | 29 May 1875 | Military division | |
| | Lieutenant-General Sir John Garvock | 29 May 1875 | Military division | |
| | Lieutenant-General Sir Neville Bowles Chamberlain | 29 May 1875 | Military division | |
| | Major-General Sir Alfred Hastings Horsford | 29 May 1875 | Military division | |
| | The Rt. Hon. Sir Henry Bartle Edward Frere, GCSI, KCB | 17 May 1876 | Civil division | |
| | General H.H. Jayajirao Scindia, Maharaja of Gwalior | 1 January 1877 | Military division, honorary | |
| | H.R.H. Adolphus Frederick, Hereditary Grand Duke of Mecklenburg-Strelitz | 17 April 1877 | Civil division, honorary | |
| | Admiral Sir George Rodney Mundy | 2 June 1877 | Military division | |
| | General Sir William Wyllie | 2 June 1877 | Military division | |
| | Lieutenant-General Sir Frederick Edward Chapman | 2 June 1877 | Military division | |
| | Lieutenant-General Sir Frederick Paul Haines | 2 June 1877 | Military division | |
| | Lieutenant-General Sir David Edward Wood | 2 June 1877 | Military division | |
| | Major-General Sir John Douglas | 2 June 1877 | Military division | |
| | Edward Robert Lytton Bulwer-Lytton, 2nd Baron Lytton, GCSI | 1 January 1878 | Civil division | |
| | The Rt. Hon. Austen Henry Layard | 11 June 1878 | Civil division | |
| | General Sir Arthur Augustus Thurlow Cunynghame | 13 June 1878 | Military division | |
| | General H.R.H. Prince Friedrich Karl of Prussia | 3 July 1878 | Military division, honorary | |
| | General John Lintorn Arabin Simmons | 29 July 1878 | Military division | |
| | General Francis George Hugh Seymour, 5th Marquess of Hertford, PC | 24 January 1879 | Civil division | |
| | Major-General Frederic Augustus Thesiger, 2nd Baron Chelmsford, KCB | 19 August 1879 | Military division | |
| | The Rt. Hon. Stephen Cave | 20 March 1880 | Civil division | |
| | The Rt. Hon. Richard Assheton Cross | 20 April 1880 | Civil division | |
| | The Rt. Hon. Sir Stafford Henry Northcote, Bt. | 20 April 1880 | Civil division | |
| | The Rt. Hon. Lord John James Robert Manners | 20 April 1880 | Civil division | |
| | Admiral of the Fleet Sir George Rose Sartorius | 23 April 1880 | Military division | |
| | Admiral of the Fleet Sir Thomas Matthew Charles Symonds | 23 April 1880 | Military division | |
| | Admiral the Hon. Sir James Robert Drummond | 23 April 1880 | Military division | |
| | Lieutenant-General Sir Garnet Wolseley, GCMG, KCB | 19 June 1880 | Military division | |
| | Lieutenant-General Sir Donald Martin Stewart | 21 September 1880 | Military division | |
| | Major-General Sir Frederick Roberts, VC, KCB | 21 September 1880 | Military division | |
| | General William Lygon Pakenham, 4th Earl of Longford | 24 May 1881 | Military division | |
| | Vice-Admiral Sir Frederick Beauchamp Paget Seymour, KCB, RN | 24 May 1881 | Military division | |
| | H.R.H. Prince Albert William Henry of Prussia | 13 August 1881 | Civil division, honorary | |
| | Henry Bouverie William Brand | 20 September 1881 | Civil division | |
| | H.S.H. George Victor, Prince of Waldeck and Pyrmont | 1882 | Civil division, honorary | |
| | General Sir Charles Henry Ellice | 15 April 1882 | Military division | |
| | Lieutenant-General Sir John Miller Adye, KCB | 17 November 1882 | Military division | |
| | Admiral Sir Astley Cooper Key | 24 November 1882 | Military division | |
| | Admiral Sir William Robert Mends | 24 November 1882 | Military division | |
| | Field Marshal Frederick William Nicholas Charles, Crown Prince of Prussia | 25 January 1883 | Military division, honorary | |
| | Frederick Temple Hamilton-Temple-Blackwood, 1st Earl of Dufferin, KP, GCMG, KCB, PC | 15 June 1883 | Civil division | |
| | The Rt. Hon. Sir Edward Thornton, KCB | 21 August 1883 | Civil division | |
| | The Rt. Hon. Sir Augustus Berkeley Paget, KCB | 21 August 1883 | Civil division | |
| | General Sir Charles William Dunbar Staveley | 24 May 1884 | Military division | |
| | General Sir Collingwood Dickson, VC, KCB | 24 May 1884 | Military division | |
| | General Sir Arthur Borton | 24 May 1884 | Military division | |
| | General Sir Henry Charles Barnston Daubeney | 24 May 1884 | Military division | |
| | General Sir James Brind | 24 May 1884 | Military division | |
| | The Rt. Hon. Sir John Alexander Macdonald, GCB, KCMG, PC PC(Can) KCB QC | 21 November 1884 | Civil division | |
| | Henry Austin Bruce, 1st Baron Aberdare, PC, FRS | 7 January 1885 | Civil division | |
| | George Augustus Constantine Phipps, 2nd Marquess of Normanby, GCMG, PC | 9 January 1885 | Civil division | |
| | Sir John Lumley-Savile, KCB | 15 June 1885 | Civil division | |
| | Charles Shaw-Lefevre, 1st Viscount Eversley, PC | 30 June 1885 | Civil division | |
| | Robert Lowe, 1st Viscount Sherbrooke, PC | 30 June 1885 | Civil division | |
| | Major-General Sir Peter Stark Lumsden | 3 July 1885 | Military division | |
| | General H.H. Prince Alexander of Hesse and by Rhine | 22 July 1885 | Military division, honorary | |
| | H.H. Prince Philipp of Saxe-Coburg and Gotha | 3 August 1885 | Civil division, honorary | |
| | Admiral Sir Geoffrey Thomas Phipps Hornby | 19 December 1885 | Military division | |
| | Lieutenant-General Sir Frederick Charles Arthur Stephenson | 30 January 1886 | Military division | |
| | The Rt. Hon. Frederick Arthur Stanley | 2 February 1886 | Civil division | |
| | The Rt. Hon. Sir Edward Baldwin Malet, GCMG, KCB | 2 February 1886 | Civil division | |
| | Admiral The Rt. Hon. Lord Clarence Edward Paget | 29 May 1886 | Military division | |
| | General George Frederick Upton, 3rd Viscount Templetown | 29 May 1886 | Military division | |
| | General Sir William Jones | 29 May 1886 | Military division | |
| | General Sir Charles Reid, KCB | 29 May 1886 | Military division | |
| | General Sir George Malcolm | 29 May 1886 | Military division | |
| | General Sir Daniel Lysons | 29 May 1886 | Military division | |
| | Lieutenant-General Sir Frederick Francis Maude, VC, KCB | 29 May 1886 | Military division | |
| | Admiral Lord John Hay, KCB, RN | 30 July 1886 | Military division | |
| | H.H. Prince Alexander Joseph of Bulgaria | 10 December 1886 | Military division, honorary | |
| | Admiral Sir George Greville Wellesley, KCB, RN | 21 June 1887 | Military division | |
| | Admiral Sir Edward Gennys Fanshawe | 21 June 1887 | Military division | |
| | General Sir Edward Cooper Hodge | 21 June 1887 | Military division | |
| | General the Rt. Hon. Sir Thomas Montague Steele | 21 June 1887 | Military division | |
| | General Sir Edwin Beaumont Johnson | 21 June 1887 | Military division | |
| | General Sir Henry Wylie Norman | 21 June 1887 | Military division | |
| | General Prince William Augustus Edward of Saxe-Weimar-Eisenach, Duke of Saxony, GCH, KCB | 21 June 1887 | Military division | |
| | Admiral Sir William Houston Stewart | 21 June 1887 | Military division | |
| | Admiral Sir John Edmund Commerell | 21 June 1887 | Military division | |
| | Lieutenant-General Sir Charles Lawrence d'Aguilar | 21 June 1887 | Military division | |
| | Lieutenant-General Sir Archibald Alison, 2nd Baronet | 21 June 1887 | Military division | |
| | Lieutenant-General Sir Charles Henry Brownlow | 21 June 1887 | Military division | |
| | H.I.H. Grand Duke Sergei Alexandrovich of Russia | 21 June 1887 | Civil division, honorary | |
| | H.R.H. Ernest Louis, Hereditary Grand Duke of Hesse | 21 June 1887 | Civil division, honorary | |
| | H.H. Bernhard, Hereditary Prince of Saxe-Meiningen | 21 June 1887 | Civil division, honorary | |
| | H.H. Mohammed Tewfik Pasha, Khedive of Egypt | 21 June 1887 | Civil division, honorary | |
| | Major-General The Rt. Hon. Sir Henry Frederick Ponsonby, KCB | 21 June 1887 | Civil division | |
| | Vice-Admiral Prince Victor Ferdinand Francis Eugene Gustavus Adolphus Constantine Frederick of Hohenlohe-Langenburg, RN | 21 June 1887 | Civil division | |
| | Commander H.S.H. Prince Louis Alexander of Battenberg, KCB, RN | 21 June 1887 | Civil division | |
| | Admiral H.S.H. Ernest Leopold Victor Charles Auguste Joseph Emich, Prince of Leiningen | 1 July 1887 | Military division | |
| | The Rt. Hon. Sir Robert Burnett David Morier, GCMG, KCB | 30 September 1887 | Civil division | |
| | H.R.H. Christian Frederick William Charles, Crown Prince of Denmark | 10 March 1888 | Civil division, honorary | |
| | The Rt. Hon. Sir William Arthur White, GCMG | 2 June 1888 | Civil division | |
| | The Rt. Hon. Sir Henry Drummond Wolff, GCMG, KCB | 2 January 1889 | Civil division | |
| | The Rt. Hon. Sir Francis Clare Ford, GCMG | 29 April 1889 | Civil division | |
| | Admiral Prince Alfred Ernest Albert, Duke of Edinburgh, KG, KT, KP, GCSI, GCMG, GCIE, KCB, PC | 25 May 1889 | Military division | |
| | General Sir Frederick Horn | 25 May 1889 | Military division | |
| | General Sir John St George | 25 May 1889 | Military division | |
| | General Sir Archibald Little | 25 May 1889 | Military division | |
| | General Sir Henry Daly | 25 May 1889 | Military division | |
| | Lieutenant-General Sir Alexander Taylor | 25 May 1889 | Military division | |
| | Sir William Jenner, Bt., KCB | 25 May 1889 | Civil division | |
| | Major-General Sir Henry Creswicke Rawlinson, KCB | 23 July 1889 | Civil division | |
| | Mirza Ali Asghar Khan Amin al-Soltan | 2 August 1889 | Civil division, honorary | |
| | Admiral Sir Arthur William Acland Hood | 3 September 1889 | Military division | |
| | H.I.H. Prince Komatsu Akihito | 1 July 1890 | Military division, honorary | |
| | Auguste, Baron Lambermont | 18 July 1890 | Civil division, honorary | |
| | HH Prince Christian Victor Albert Louis Ernest Anton of Schleswig-Holstein | 19 July 1890 | Civil division | |
| | General Sir Samuel James Browne, VC, KCB | 30 May 1891 | Military division | |
| | General Sir Charles Patton Keyes | 30 May 1891 | Military division | |
| | General Sir John Ross | 30 May 1891 | Military division | |
| | Lieutenant-General Sir John Chetham McLeod | 30 May 1891 | Military division | |
| | Lieutenant-General Sir Henry Evelyn Wood, VC, KCB | 30 May 1891 | Military division | |
| | H.H. Prince Aribert Joseph Alexander of Anhalt | 14 July 1891 | Civil division | |
| | General Alexander Nelson Hood, 3rd Baron Bridport, KCB | 23 October 1891 | Civil division | |
| | General H.G.D.H. Prince Henry Louis William Adalbert Waldemar Alexander of Hesse and by Rhine | 16 May 1892 | Military division, honorary | |
| | H.S.H. Adolf Georg, Prince of Schaumburg-Lippe | 16 May 1892 | Civil division, honorary | |
| | Admiral Sir George Ommanney Willes | 25 May 1892 | Military division | |
| | Sir Julian Pauncefote, GCMG, KCB | 25 May 1892 | Civil division | |
| | H.H. Abbas Pasha, Khedive of Egypt | 10 June 1892 | Civil division, honorary | |
| | Edward Bootle-Wilbraham, 1st Earl of Lathom, PC | 1 August 1892 | Civil division | |
| | Sir Robert George Wyndham Herbert, KCB | 1 August 1892 | Civil division | |
| | Sir Philip Henry Wodehouse Currie, KCB | 1 August 1892 | Civil division | |
| | Sir Henry Brougham Loch, GCMG, KCB | 20 August 1892 | Civil division | |
| | Sir Reginald Earle Welby, KCB | 20 August 1892 | Civil division | |
| | Farrer Herschell, 1st Baron Herschell, PC | 19 May 1893 | Civil division | |
| | Lieutenant-General Sir James Hills-Johnes, VC, KCB | 3 June 1893 | Military division | |
| | General Sir William Montagu Scott McMurdo | 3 June 1893 | Military division | |
| | General Lord Mark Kerr | 3 June 1893 | Military division | |
| | Admiral Sir Anthony Hiley Hoskins | 17 November 1893 | Military division | |
| | H.H. Abdur Rahman Khan, Emir of Afghanistan | 29 December 1893 | Civil division, honorary | |
| | General Sir Robert Onesiphorus Bright | 26 May 1894 | Military division | |
| | General Sir Robert Phayre | 26 May 1894 | Military division | |
| | Major-General Sir Charles Henry Palliser | 26 May 1894 | Military division | |
| | General Sir Charles George Arbuthnot | 26 May 1894 | Military division | |
| | Lieutenant-General the Rt. Hon. Sir Redvers Henry Buller, VC, KCB, KCMG | 26 May 1894 | Military division | |
| | Evelyn Baring, 1st Baron Cromer, GCMG, KCB | 8 January 1895 | Civil division | |
| | General Sir Michael Anthony Shrapnel Biddulph | 25 May 1895 | Military division | |
| | General Sir George Henry Smith Willis | 25 May 1895 | Military division | |
| | General Sir Charles John Stanley Gough, VC, KCB | 25 May 1895 | Military division | |
| | Lieutenant-General Sir Drury Curzon Drury-Lowe | 25 May 1895 | Military division | |
| | Admiral Sir William Montagu Dowell | 25 May 1895 | Military division | |
| | Admiral of the Fleet Richard James Meade, 4th Earl of Clanwilliam | 25 May 1895 | Military division | |
| | Admiral Sir Richard Vesey Hamilton | 25 May 1895 | Military division | |
| | Lyon Playfair, 1st Baron Playfair, KCB, PC | 25 May 1895 | Civil division | |
| | The Rt. Hon. James Stansfeld | 25 May 1895 | Civil division | |
| | Admiral Sir Frederick William Richards | 28 June 1895 | Military division | |
| | The Rt. Hon. Henry Campbell-Bannerman | 29 June 1895 | Civil division | |
| | H.R.H. Constantine, Crown Prince of Greece | 4 July 1895 | Civil division, honorary | |
| | Major-General Sir Robert Cunliffe Low | 21 January 1896 | Military division | |
| | General Sir Hugh Henry Gough, VC, KCB | 20 May 1896 | Military division | |
| | Lieutenant-General Sir Gerald Graham, VC, KCB | 20 May 1896 | Military division | |
| | General Sir George Richard Greaves | 20 May 1896 | Military division | |
| | The Rt. Hon. Sir Edmund John Monson, GCMG | 20 May 1896 | Civil division | |
| | H.R.H. Prince Christian Frederick Charles George Waldemar Axel of Denmark | 21 July 1896 | Civil division, honorary | |
| | The Rt. Hon. Sir Frank Cavendish Lascelles, GCMG | 1 January 1897 | Civil division | |
| | The Hon. Sir Robert Henry Meade, KCB | 23 March 1897 | Civil division | |
| | General Sir Anthony Blaxland Stransham | 22 June 1897 | Military division | |
| | Lieutenant-General Sir George Stuart White, VC, KCB | 22 June 1897 | Military division | |
| | Major-General Sir Henry Marshman Havelock-Allan, Bt., VC, KCB | 22 June 1897 | Military division | |
| | Admiral Sir Nowell Salmon, VC, KCB | 22 June 1897 | Military division | |
| | Admiral Sir Algernon McLennan Lyons, KCB, ADC | 22 June 1897 | Military division | |
| | Admiral Sir Michael Culme-Seymour, Bt. | 22 June 1897 | Military division | |
| | H.H. Prince Frederick Charles of Hesse | 22 June 1897 | Civil division, honorary | |
| | Sir Spencer Cecil Brabazon Ponsonby-Fane, KCB | 22 June 1897 | Civil division | |
| | Sir Arthur Lawrence Haliburton, KCB | 22 June 1897 | Civil division | |
| | Colonel Sir Edward Ridley Colborne Bradford, Bt., KCB, KCSI, ADC | 22 June 1897 | Civil division | |
| | The Rt. Hon. Sir Nicholas Roderick O'Conor, GCMG, KCB | 22 June 1897 | Civil division | |
| | The Rt. Hon. Sir Horace Rumbold, Bt., GCMG | 22 June 1897 | Civil division | |
| | H.S.H. Ernest William Frederick Charles Maximilian, Hereditary Prince of Hohenlohe-Langenburg | 22 October 1897 | Civil division, honorary | |
| | General Sir William Stephen Alexander Lockhart | 20 May 1898 | Military division | |
| | Field Marshal Prince Arthur, Duke of Connaught and Strathearn, KG, KT, KP, GCSI, GCMG, GCIE, GCVO, KCB, PC | 21 May 1898 | Military division | |
| | Lieutenant-General Sir Francis Wallace Grenfell | 15 November 1898 | Military division | |
| | Major-General Sir Horatio Herbert Kitchener, KCB, KCMG | 15 November 1898 | Military division | |
| | Sir Hugh Owen, KCB | 2 January 1899 | Civil division | |
| | Sir Charles Lennox Peel, KCB | 2 January 1899 | Civil division | |
| | General Sir John Forbes | 3 June 1899 | Military division | |
| | Admiral Sir Walter James Hunt-Grubbe | 3 June 1899 | Military division | |
| | Admiral the Hon. Sir Edmund Robert Fremantle | 3 June 1899 | Military division | |
| | Admiral Sir John Ommanney Hopkins | 3 June 1899 | Military division | |
| | General Sir Robert Biddulph | 3 June 1899 | Military division | |
| | Sir Charles Stewart Scott, GCMG | 9 June 1899 | Civil division | |
| | Henry Morton Stanley, Esq. | 9 June 1899 | Civil division | |
| | General Sir Charles Cooper Johnson | 23 May 1900 | Military division | |
| | Lieutenant-General Sir Baker Creed Russell | 23 May 1900 | Military division | |
| | General Sir William Olpherts, VC, KCB | 23 May 1900 | Military division | |
| | Victor Albert George Child Villiers, 7th Earl of Jersey, GCMG, PC | 23 May 1900 | Civil division | |
| | H.R.H. Prince George of Greece and Denmark | 29 June 1900 | Civil division, honorary | |
| | Vice-Admiral Sir Edward Hobart Seymour (Royal Navy officer) | 9 November 1900 | Military division | |
| | Sir Thomas Henry Sanderson, KCB, KCMG | 16 November 1900 | Civil division | |
| | H.H. Prince Albert John Charles Frederick Alfred George of Schleswig-Holstein | 27 November 1900 | Civil division | |
| | Lieutenant-General Sir Henry Brackenbury | 29 November 1900 | Military division | |
| | Lieutenant-General Sir Charles Mansfield Clarke, Bt., KCB | 29 November 1900 | Military division | |
| | Sir Alfred Milner, GCMG, KCB | 1 January 1901 | Civil division | |
| | Sir Francis Mowatt, KCB | 1 January 1901 | Civil division | |

=== Edward VII ===
| Image | Name | Date | Notes | References |
|---|---|---|---|---|
| | Sir Robert Romer, KC | 13 February 1901 | Civil division | |
| | H.I.H. Grand Duke Michael Alexandrovich of Russia | 15 February 1901 | Civil division, honorary | |
| | H.I.R.H. Archduke Franz Ferdinand of Austria | 19 February 1901 | Civil division, honorary | |
| | H.R.H. Oscar Gustave Adolphus, Crown Prince of Sweden | 19 February 1901 | Civil division, honorary | |
| | H.R.H. Luitpold Charles Joseph Guillaume Louis, Prince Regent of Bavaria | 19 March 1901 | Military division, honorary | |
| | Moulay Abdelaziz, Sultan of Morocco | 2 July 1901 | Civil division, honorary | |
| | Field Marshal Alfred von Waldersee | 16 August 1901 | Military division, honorary | |
| | H.R.H. Prince Valdemar of Denmark | 17 September 1901 | Civil division, honorary | |
| | The Rt. Hon. Sir Francis Richard Plunkett, GCMG | 9 November 1901 | Civil division | |
| | Marquess Itō Hirobumi | 14 January 1902 | Civil division, honorary | |
| | Admiral Lord Walter Talbot Kerr | 26 June 1902 | Military division | |
| | Admiral Sir John Arbuthnot Fisher | 26 June 1902 | Military division | |
| | Vice-Admiral Sir Frederick George Denham Bedford | 26 June 1902 | Military division | |
| | Admiral the Rt. Hon. Sir John Charles Dalrymple-Hay, Bt. | 26 June 1902 | Military division | |
| | Admiral Sir William Graham | 26 June 1902 | Military division | |
| | Admiral Sir Algernon Charles Fieschi Heneage | 26 June 1902 | Military division | |
| | Admiral Sir Alexander Buller | 26 June 1902 | Military division | |
| | General Sir Richard Chambre Hayes Taylor | 26 June 1902 | Military division | |
| | General Sir Harry North Dalrymple Prendergast, VC, KCB | 26 June 1902 | Military division | |
| | General Sir John Watson, VC, KCB | 26 June 1902 | Military division | |
| | Lieutenant-General Sir Robert Hume | 26 June 1902 | Military division | |
| | General Sir Martin Andrew Dillon | 26 June 1902 | Military division | |
| | General Sir Reginald Gipps | 26 June 1902 | Military division | |
| | Lieutenant-General Sir Robert Grant, KCB | 26 June 1902 | Military division | |
| | Edward Hyde Villiers, 5th Earl of Clarendon, PC | 26 June 1902 | Civil division | |
| | The Rt. Hon. Sir Francis Henry Jeune, KCB | 26 June 1902 | Civil division | |
| | The Rt. Hon. Sir Algernon Edward West, KCB | 26 June 1902 | Civil division | |
| | General The Rt. Hon. Sir Dighton Macnaghten Probyn, VC, GCVO, KCB | 26 June 1902 | Civil division | |
| | H.M. Menelik II, Emperor of Ethiopia | 19 September 1902 | Military division, honorary | |
| | Lieutenant-General Paul Sanford Methuen, 3rd Baron Methuen | 31 October 1902 | Military division | |
| | Admiral Sir Robert Henry More-Molyneux | 9 November 1902 | Military division | |
| | Admiral Sir Charles Frederick Hotham | 9 November 1902 | Military division | |
| | Admiral Lord Charles Thomas Montagu-Douglas-Scott | 9 November 1902 | Military division | |
| | H.I.H. Prince Arisugawa Takehito | 28 November 1902 | Civil division, honorary | |
| | H.H. Asaf Jah VI, Sir Mahboob Ali Khan, Nizam of Hyderabad | 1 January 1903 | Civil division, honorary | |
| | H.R.H. Prince Carlos of Bourbon-Two Sicilies, Prince of Asturias | 27 January 1903 | Civil division, honorary | |
| | General Sir Arthur Power Palmer | 26 June 1903 | Military division | |
| | General Sir George Wentworth Alexander Higginson | 26 June 1903 | Military division | |
| | General Sir Richard Harrison | 26 June 1903 | Military division | |
| | Admiral Sir Cyprian Arthur George Bridge | 9 November 1903 | Military division | |
| | H.S.H. Friedrich, Prince of Waldeck and Pyrmont | 26 April 1904 | Military division, honorary | |
| | H.I.R.H. Archduke Friedrich, Duke of Teschen | 10 June 1904 | Military division, honorary | |
| | General Sir Edward Alan Holdich | 24 June 1904 | Military division | |
| | General Sir John Alexander Ewart | 24 June 1904 | Military division | |
| | General Sir William Gordon Cameron | 24 June 1904 | Military division | |
| | Lieutenant-General Sir Thomas Kelly-Kenny | 24 June 1904 | Military division | |
| | Lieutenant-General Sir Charles Comyn Egerton | 24 June 1904 | Military division | |
| | Admiral Sir Compton Edward Domvile | 9 November 1904 | Military division | |
| | General Sir Edward Gascoigne Bulwer, KCB | 30 June 1905 | Military division | |
| | General Sir James Macleod Bannatyne Fraser-Tytler, KCB | 30 June 1905 | Military division | |
| | General Sir John Luther Vaughan, KCB | 30 June 1905 | Military division | |
| | Lieutenant-General the Hon. Sir David Macdowall Fraser, KCB | 30 June 1905 | Military division | |
| | General Sir Richard Thomas Farren, KCB | 30 June 1905 | Military division | |
| | General Lord Alexander George Russell, KCB | 30 June 1905 | Military division | |
| | H.I.H. Prince Arisugawa Takehito | 30 June 1905 | Civil division (honorary) | |
| | Admiral Sir Harry Holdsworth Rawson, KCB | 29 June 1906 | Military division | |
| | Lieutenant-General Sir William Francis Butler, KCB | 29 June 1906 | Military division | |
| | Lieutenant-General Sir John Withers Mcqueen, KCB | 29 June 1906 | Military division | |
| | Lieutenant-General Sir Julius Augustus Robert Raines, KCB | 29 June 1906 | Military division | |
| | H.E. General Porfirio Díaz, President of the United States of Mexico | 29 June 1906 | Civil division, honorary | |
| | Thomas Brassey, 1st Baron Brassey, KCB | 29 June 1906 | Civil division | |
| | Sir Kenelm Edward Digby, KCB | 29 June 1906 | Civil division | |
| | Sir Edward Walter Hamilton, KCB, KCVO, ISO | 29 June 1906 | Civil division | |
| | Admiral Sir Arthur Knyvet Wilson, VC, GCVO, KCB | 9 November 1906 | Military division | |
| | Sir Evan MacGregor, KCB | 9 November 1906 | Civil division | |
| | Colonel Sir Joseph West Ridgeway, GCMG, KCB, KCSI | 9 November 1906 | Civil division | |
| | Sir Edward Fry, GCMG | 7 May 1907 | Civil division | |
| | General Sir George Benjamin Wolseley, KCB | 28 June 1907 | Military division | |
| | General the Hon. Sir Neville Gerald Lyttelton, KCB | 28 June 1907 | Military division | |
| | Sir Arthur Nicolson, Bt., GCMG, GCVO, KCB, KCIE | 10 October 1907 | Civil division | |
| | General Sir William Gustavus Nicholson, KCB | 26 June 1908 | Military division | |
| | General Sir John James Hood Gordon, KCB | 26 June 1908 | Military division | |
| | Francis Knollys, 1st Baron Knollys, GCVO, KCB, KCMG, ISO | 26 June 1908 | Civil division | |
| | Sir Francis Leveson Bertie, GCMG, GCVO, KCB | 26 June 1908 | Civil division | |
| | Sir John Arthur Godley, KCB | 26 June 1908 | Civil division | |
| | Sir George Herbert Murray, KCB, ISO | 26 June 1908 | Civil division | |
| | Reginald Baliol Brett, 2nd Viscount Esher, GCVO, KCB | 9 November 1908 | Civil division | |
| | General Sir Bindon Blood, KCB | 25 June 1909 | Military division | |
| | General Sir George Luck, KCB | 25 June 1909 | Military division | |
| | General Sir Alfred Gaselee, GCIE, KCB | 25 June 1909 | Military division | |
| | General Sir John Denton Pinkstone French, GCVO, KCB, KCMG | 25 June 1909 | Military division | |
| | Lieutenant-General Sir Edmund George Barrow, KCB | 25 June 1909 | Military division | |
| | General Sir O'Moore Creagh, VC, KCB | 25 June 1909 | Military division | |
| | The Rt. Hon. Sir Ernest Joseph Cassel, GCMG, GCVO | 25 June 1909 | Civil division | |
| | Sir Edward Maunde Thompson, KCB, ISO | 25 June 1909 | Civil division | |

=== George V and Edward VIII ===
| Image | Name | Date | Notes | References |
|---|---|---|---|---|
| | General Sir Ian Standish Monteith Hamilton, KCB, DSO | 24 June 1910 | Military division | |
| | Sir Charles Hardinge, GCMG, GCVO, CB, ISO | 24 June 1910 | Civil division | |
| | Admiral Sir Archibald Lucius Douglas, GCVO, KCB | 3 January 1911 | Military Division | |
| | Admiral of the Fleet Sir Arthur Dalrymple Fanshawe, GCVO, KCB | 19 June 1911 | Military division | |
| | Admiral Sir Lewis Anthony Beaumont, KCB, KCMG | 19 June 1911 | Military division | |
| | Admiral Sir Arthur William Moore, KCB, KCVO, CMG | 19 June 1911 | Military division | |
| | Admiral Sir Charles Carter Drury, GCVO, KCB, KCSI | 19 June 1911 | Military division | |
| | Admiral Sir Wilmot Hawksworth Fawkes, KCB, KCVO | 19 June 1911 | Military division | |
| | Admiral Lord Charles William Delapoer Beresford, GCVO, KCB | 19 June 1911 | Military division | |
| | Admiral Sir William Robert Kennedy, KCB | 19 June 1911 | Military division | |
| | Admiral Sir William Henry May, GCVO, KCB | 19 June 1911 | Military division | |
| | General Sir Archibald Hunter, KCB, DSO | 19 June 1911 | Military division | |
| | General Sir Henry John Thoroton Hildyard, KCB | 19 June 1911 | Military division | |
| | General Sir Robert MacGregor Stewart, KCB | 19 June 1911 | Military division | |
| | General Sir Beauchamp Duff, KCB, KCSI, KCVO, CIE | 19 June 1911 | Military division | |
| | General Sir Henry Macleod Leslie Rundle, KCB, KCMG, DSO | 19 June 1911 | Military division | |
| | General Sir Edward Stedman, KCB, KCIE | 19 June 1911 | Military division | |
| | General Sir Charles Whittingham Horsley Douglas, KCB | 19 June 1911 | Military division | |
| | Major Prince Adolphus Charles Alexander Albert Edward George Philip Louis Ladislaus, Duke of Teck, GCVO, CMG | 19 June 1911 | Civil division | |
| | Major Prince Alexander Augustus Frederick William Alfred George of Teck, GCVO, DSO | 19 June 1911 | Civil division | |
| | Edward Macnaghten, Baron Macnaghten, GCMG, PC, KC | 19 June 1911 | Civil division | |
| | Sir (William) Edward Goschen, GCMG, GCVO | 19 June 1911 | Civil division | |
| | Sir Charles Inigo Thomas, KCB | 19 June 1911 | Civil division | |
| | Sir Kenneth Augustus Muir Mackenzie, KCB, KC | 19 June 1911 | Civil division | |
| | Sir Courtenay Peregrine Ilbert, KCB, KCSI, CIE | 19 June 1911 | Civil division | |
| | William Humble Ward, 2nd Earl of Dudley, GCMG, GCVO, PC | 10 October 1911 | Civil division | |
| | Albert Grey, 4th Earl Grey, GCB, GCMG, GCVO, PC | 23 October 1911 | Civil division | |
| | General Count Nogi Maresuke | 29 December 1911 | Military division, honorary | |
| | General Sir George Digby Barker, KCB | 11 June 1912 | Military division | |
| | Lieutenant-General Sir Charles Tucker, GCVO, KCB | 11 June 1912 | Military division | |
| | Admiral Sir Francis Charles Bridgeman, GCVO, KCB | 10 December 1912 | Military division | |
| | Admiral of the Fleet Sir Gerard Henry Uctred Noel, KCB, KCMG | 3 January 1913 | Military division | |
| | Admiral Sir Reginald Neville Custance, KCB, KCMG, CVO | 3 June 1913 | Military division | |
| | Admiral Sir John Durnford | 3 June 1913 | Military division | |
| | Admiral the Hon. Sir Hedworth Meux, KCB, KCVO | 3 June 1913 | Military division | |
| | General Sir Horace Lockwood Smith-Dorrien, KCB, DSO | 3 June 1913 | Military division | |
| | General the Rt. Hon. Sir Arthur Henry Fitzroy Paget, KCB, KCVO | 3 June 1913 | Military division | |
| | General Sir Josceline Heneage Wodehouse, KCB, CMG | 3 June 1913 | Military division | |
| | Lieutenant-General Sir Herbert Scott Gould Miles, KCB, CVO | 2 January 1914 | Military division | |
| | Admiral Sir Reginald Friend Hannam Henderson, KCB | 22 June 1914 | Military division | |
| | General Sir Francis Reginald Wingate, GCVO, KCB, KCMG, DSO | 22 June 1914 | Military division | |
| | General Sir Arthur Singleton Wynne, KCB | 22 June 1914 | Military division | |
| | Herbert John Gladstone, 1st Viscount Gladstone, GCMG, PC | 22 June 1914 | Civil division | |
| | Admiral Sir John Rushworth Jellicoe, KCB, KCVO, SGM | 8 February 1915 | Military division | |
| | General Sir Douglas Haig, KCB, KCIE, KCVO, ADC | 3 June 1915 | Military division | |
| | General Sir Bruce Meade Hamilton, KCB, KCVO | 3 June 1915 | Military division | |
| | Sir George William Buchanan, GCMG, GCVO | 3 June 1915 | Civil division | |
| | Rufus Daniel Isaacs, 1st Baron Reading, KCVO, PC | 3 June 1915 | Civil division | |
| | The Rt. Hon. Sir George Houstoun Reid, GCMG, KC | 1 January 1916 | Civil division | |
| | Sir Robert Chalmers, KCB | 1 January 1916 | Civil division | |
| | Vice-Admiral Sir David Beatty, KCB, DSO | 31 May 1916 | Military division | |
| | Admiral Sir George Astley Callaghan, GCVO, KCB | 3 June 1916 | Military division | |
| | General Sir William Henry Mackinnon, KCB, KCVO | 3 June 1916 | Military division | |
| | The Rt. Hon. Sir John Hay Athole Macdonald, KCB, KC | 3 June 1916 | Civil division | |
| | Arthur John Bigge, 1st Baron Stamfordham, GCIE, GCVO, KCB, KCSI, KCMG | 3 June 1916 | Civil division | |
| | The Rt. Hon. Sir Francis John Stephens Hopwood, GCMG, KCB | 3 June 1916 | Civil division | |
| | Admiral Sir Henry Bradwardine Jackson, KCB, KCVO | 4 December 1916 | Military division | |
| | General Sir William Robert Robertson, KCB, KCVO, DSO | 1 January 1917 | Military division | |
| | Lieutenant-General Sir Alfred Keogh, KCB, FRCP, Surgeon-General | 1 January 1917 | Military division | |
| | The Rt. Hon. Sir Samuel Thomas Evans | 1 January 1917 | Civil division | |
| | Sir Thomas William Holderness, KCB, KCSI | 4 June 1917 | Civil division | |
| | General Sir Herbert Charles Onslow Plumer, GCMG, GCVO, KCB, ADC | 1 January 1918 | Military division | |
| | General Sir Robert Irvin Scallon, KCB, KCIE, DSO | 1 January 1918 | Military division | |
| | Lieutenant-General H.H. Sir Pratap Singh, Regent of Jodhpur, GCSI, GCVO, KCB, ADC | 1 January 1918 | Military division, honorary | |
| | King Alexander I of Greece, GCB | March 1918 | Military division | |
| | Vice-Admiral Sir Rosslyn Erskine Wemyss, KCB, CMG, MVO | 3 June 1918 | Military division | |
| | General Sir Arthur Arnold Barrett, KCB, KCSI, KCVO, ADC | 3 June 1918 | Military division | |
| | General Sir Edmund Henry Hynman Allenby, GCMG, KCB | 5 November 1918 | Military division | |
| | General Sir Henry Hughes Wilson, KCB, DSO | 17 December 1918 | Military division | |
| | Vice-Admiral Sir Charles Edward Madden, KCB, KCMG, CVO | 1 January 1919 | Military division | |
| | General Sir Henry Seymour Rawlinson, Bt., GCVO, KCB, KCMG | 1 January 1919 | Military division | |
| | General Sir Julian Hedworth George Byng, KCB, KCMG, MVO | 1 January 1919 | Military division | |
| | General Sir Charles Carmichael Monro, GCMG, KCB, ADC | 1 January 1919 | Military division | |
| | The Rt. Hon. Sir Eric Campbell Geddes, GBE, KCB | 1 January 1919 | Civil division | |
| | General Sir John Steven Cowans, GCMG, KCB, MVO | 20 March 1919 | Military division | |
| | Sir Reginald Herbert Brade, KCB | 3 June 1919 | Civil division | |
| | Sir Hubert Llewellyn Smith, KCB | 3 June 1919 | Civil division | |
| | Sir John Swanwick Bradbury, KCB | 1 January 1920 | Civil division | |
| | The Rt. Hon. Sir David Harrel, GBE, KCB, KCVO, ISO | 1 January 1920 | Civil division | |
| | The Rt. Hon. Sir James Rennell Rodd, GCMG, GCVO, CB | 1 January 1920 | Civil division | |
| | John Andrew Hamilton, 1st Baron Sumner | 4 June 1920 | Civil division | |
| | Admiral Louis Alexander Mountbatten, 1st Marquess of Milford Haven, GCB, GCVO, KCMG | 1 January 1921 | Military division | |
| | Admiral Sir Frederick Charles Doveton Sturdee, Bt., KCB, KCMG, CVO | 1 January 1921 | Military division | |
| | Admiral Sir John Michael de Robeck, GCMG, KCB | 1 January 1921 | Military division | |
| | General Sir James Willcocks, KCB, KCSI, DSO | 3 June 1921 | Military division | |
| | General Sir Herbert Vaughan Cox, KCB, KCMG, CSI | 3 June 1921 | Military division | |
| | The Rt. Hon. James William Lowther, JP, DL | 19 July 1921 | Civil division | |
| | Admiral of the Fleet Sir Cecil Burney, Bt., GCMG, KCB | 1 January 1922 | Military division | |
| | The Rt. Hon. Horace Farquhar, 1st Viscount Farquhar, GCVO | 1 January 1922 | Civil division | |
| | Admiral the Hon. Sir Somerset Arthur Gough-Calthorpe, GCMG, KCB, CVO | 2 June 1922 | Military division | |
| | General Sir William Riddell Birdwood, Bt., GCMG, KCB, KCSI, CIE, DSO | 1 January 1923 | Military division | |
| | Sir Norman Fenwick Warren Fisher, KCB | 1 January 1923 | Civil division | |
| | The Rt. Hon. Sir John Anderson, KCB | 1 January 1923 | Civil division | |
| | Sir Eyre Alexander Barby Wichart Crowe, GCMG, KCB | 1 June 1923 | Civil division | |
| | Air Chief Marshal Sir Hugh Montague Trenchard, Bt., KCB, DSO, ADC | 1 January 1924 | Military division | |
| | Admiral Sir Montague Edward Browning, GCMG, KCB, MVO | 3 June 1924 | Military division | |
| | Admiral Sir Hugh Evan-Thomas, KCB, KCMG, MVO | 3 June 1924 | Military division | |
| | Admiral Sir William Christopher Pakenham, KCB, KCMG, KCVO | 3 June 1925 | Military division | |
| | Admiral Sir Alexander Ludovic Duff, GBE, KCB, KCVO | 1 January 1926 | Military division | |
| | General the Hon. Sir Herbert Alexander Lawrence, KCB | 1 January 1926 | Military division | |
| | General Frederick Rudolph Lambart, 10th Earl of Cavan, KP, GCMG, GCVO, KCB, DL | 1 January 1926 | Military division | |
| | The Rt. Hon. Sir Frederick Edward Grey Ponsonby, GCVO, KCB | 1 January 1926 | Civil division | |
| | General Sir Claud William Jacob, KCB, KCSI, KCMG | 5 June 1926 | Military division | |
| | The Rt. Hon. Sir Herbert Louis Samuel, GBE | 5 June 1926 | Civil division | |
| | General Sir George Francis Milne, KCB, DSO, ADC | 1 January 1927 | Military division | |
| | Sir Claud Schuster KCB, CVO, KC | 1 January 1927 | Civil division | |
| | Admiral Sir Arthur Cavenagh Leveson, KCB, ADC | 3 June 1927 | Military division | |
| | Alexander Albert Mountbatten, 1st Marquess of Carisbrooke, GCVO | 3 June 1927 | Civil division | |
| | General Sir Archibald James Murray, GCMG, KCB, CVO, DSO | 1 January 1928 | Military division | |
| | General Sir Alexander John Godley, KCB, KCMG, ADC | 1 January 1928 | Military division | |
| | General Sir Havelock Hudson, KCB, KCIE | 1 January 1928 | Military division | |
| | General Sir Alexander Stanhope Cobbe, VC, KCB, KCSI, DSO | 1 January 1928 | Military division | |
| | The Rt. Hon. Sir John Eldon Bankes | 1 January 1928 | Civil division | |
| | Admiral of the Fleet Sir Henry Francis Oliver, KCB, KCMG, MVO | 4 June 1928 | Military division | |
| | General Sir John Philip Du Cane, KCB | 4 June 1928 | Military division | |
| | General Sir George de Symons Barrow, KCB, KCMG | 4 June 1928 | Military division | |
| | The Rt. Hon. Sir Esmé William Howard, GCMG, KCB, CVO | 4 June 1928 | Civil division | |
| | Admiral Sir Osmond De Beauvoir Brock, KCB, KCMG, KCVO | 1 January 1929 | Military division | |
| | General Sir Walter Pipon Braithwaite, KCB, ADC | 1 January 1929 | Military division | |
| | General Sir John Stuart Mackenzie Shea, KCB, KCMG, DSO | 1 January 1929 | Military division | |
| | Sir William Arthur Robinson, KCB, CBE | 1 January 1929 | Civil division | |
| | Admiral Sir Sydney Robert Fremantle, KCB, MVO | 3 June 1929 | Military division | |
| | Admiral Sir Richard Fortescue Phillimore, KCB, KCMG, MVO, ADC | 3 June 1929 | Military division | |
| | General Sir Philip Walhouse Chetwode, Bt., KCB, KCMG, DSO | 3 June 1929 | Military division | |
| | Arthur Hamilton Lee, 1st Viscount Lee of Fareham, GCSI, GBE, KCB | 3 June 1929 | Civil division | |
| | Admiral Sir William Edmund Goodenough, KCB, MVO | 1 January 1930 | Military division | |
| | Admiral of the Fleet Sir Roger John Brownlow Keyes, Bt., KCB, KCVO, CMG, DSO | 30 May 1930 | Military division | |
| | Admiral Sir Edwyn Sinclair Alexander-Sinclair, KCB, MVO, ADC | 30 May 1930 | Military division | |
| | General Sir Robert Dundas Whigham, KCB, KCMG, DSO | 1 January 1931 | Military division | |
| | Sir Oswyn Alexander Ruthven Murray, KCB | 1 January 1931 | Civil division | |
| | General Sir Reginald Clare Hart, VC, KCB, KCVO | 2 June 1931 | Military division | |
| | Air Chief Marshal Sir John Maitland Salmond, KCB, CMG, CVO, DSO | 2 June 1931 | Military division | |
| | General Sir Charles Fergusson, Bt., GCMG, KCB, DSO, MVO | 3 June 1932 | Military division | |
| | Rowland Thomas Baring, 2nd Earl of Cromer, GCIE, GCVO, PC | 3 June 1932 | Civil division | |
| | The Rt. Hon. Sir Ronald William Graham, GCMG, GCVO, CB | 3 June 1932 | Civil division | |
| | General Sir Charles Harington Harington, KCB, CBE, DSO | 1 January 1933 | Military division | |
| | Admiral of the Fleet Sir Frederick Laurence Field, KCB, KCMG | 3 June 1933 | Military division | |
| | General Sir Robert Archibald Cassels, KCB, CSI, DSO, ADC | 3 June 1933 | Military division | |
| | Sir Herbert James Creedy, KCB, KCVO | 3 June 1933 | Civil division | |
| | Colonel the Rt. Hon. Sir Clive Wigram, GCVO, KCB, CSI | 3 June 1933 | Civil division | |
| | Admiral Sir Alfred Ernle Montacute Chatfield, KCB, KCMG, CVO | 1 January 1934 | Military division | |
| | The Rt. Hon. Sir Horace George Montagu Rumbold, Bt., GCMG, MVO | 1 January 1934 | Civil division | |
| | William Douglas Weir, 1st Baron Weir, DL | 1 January 1934 | Civil division | |
| | General Sir Archibald Armar Montgomery-Massingberd, KCB, KCMG, ADC | 4 June 1934 | Military division | |
| | General Sir David Graham Muschet Campbell, KCB | 1 January 1935 | Military division | |
| | General Sir Cecil Francis Romer, KCB, KBE, CMG | 1 January 1935 | Military division | |
| | General Sir Cyril Norman MacMullen, KCB, CMG, CIE, DSO | 1 January 1935 | Military division | |
| | Sir Josiah Stamp, CBE, FBA | 1 January 1935 | Civil division | |
| | Admiral Sir John Donald Kelly, GCVO, KCB | 3 June 1935 | Military division | |
| | Admiral Sir William Wordsworth Fisher, KCB, CVO | 3 June 1935 | Military division | |
| | General Sir Cyril John Deverell, KCB, KBE, ADC | 3 June 1935 | Military division | |
| | General the Hon. Sir John Francis Gathorne-Hardy | 3 June 1935 | Military division | |
| | General Sir Kenneth Wigram, KCB, CSI, CBE, DSO, ADC | 3 June 1935 | Military division | |
| | Air Chief Marshal Sir Edward Leonard Ellington, KCB, CMG, CBE | 3 June 1935 | Military division | |
| | Admiral William Boyle, 12th Earl of Cork and 12th Earl of Orrery, GCVO, KCB | 23 June 1936 | Military division | |

=== George VI ===
| Image | Name | Date | Notes | References |
|---|---|---|---|---|
| | General Sir John Theodosius Burnett-Stuart, KCB, KBE, CMG, DSO | 11 May 1937 | Military division | |
| | General Sir Hubert de la Poer Gough, GCMG, KCB, KCVO | 11 May 1937 | Military division | |
| | Air Chief Marshal Sir John Miles Steel, KCB, KBE, CMG | 11 May 1937 | Military division | |
| | The Rt. Hon. Sir Isaac Alfred Isaacs, GCMG, KC | 11 May 1937 | Civil division | |
| | Sir Horace John Wilson, GCMG, KCB, CBE | 11 May 1937 | Civil division | |
| | Admiral Sir Roger Roland Charles Backhouse, GCVO, KCB, CMG | 1 January 1938 | Military division | |
| | General Sir Arthur Grenfell Wauchope, GCMG, KCB, CIE, DSO | 1 January 1938 | Military division | |
| | Sir Robert Gilbert Vansittart, GCMG, KCB, MVO | 1 January 1938 | Civil division | |
| | General Sir William Edmund Ironside, KCB, CMG, DSO | 9 June 1938 | Military division | |
| | Air Chief Marshal Sir Cyril Louis Norton Newall, KCB, CMG, CBE, AM | 9 June 1938 | Military division | |
| | Admiral Sir Alfred Dudley Pickman Rogers Pound, GCVO, KCB | 2 January 1939 | Military division | |
| | General Sir Walter Mervyn St. George Kirke, KCB, CMG, DSO | 2 January 1939 | Military division | |
| | General Sir William Henry Bartholomew, KCB, CMG, DSO | 6 June 1939 | Military division | |
| | The Rt. Hon. Sir Ronald Charles Lindsay, GCMG, KCB, CVO | 6 June 1939 | Civil division | |
| | Sir Samuel Findlater Stewart, GCIE, KCB, CSI | 6 June 1939 | Civil division | |
| | General John Standish Surtees Prendergast Vereker, 6th Viscount Gort, VC, KCB, CBE, DSO, MVO, MC | 1 June 1940 | Military division | |
| | Admiral of the Fleet Sir Charles Morton Forbes, KCB, DSO | 9 July 1940 | Military division | |
| | General Sir John Francis Stanhope Duke Coleridge, KCB, CMG, DSO | 9 July 1940 | Military division | |
| | Air Chief Marshal Sir Hugh Caswall Tremenheere Dowding, GCVO, KCB, CMG | 8 October 1940 | Military division | |
| | General Sir Charles Bonham-Carter, KCB, CMG, DSO, ADC | 1 January 1941 | Military division | |
| | Sir Richard Valentine Nind Hopkins, KCB | 1 January 1941 | Civil division | |
| | The Rt. Hon. Sir Eric Clare Edmund Phipps, GCMG, GCVO | 1 January 1941 | Civil division | |
| | Admiral Sir Andrew Browne Cunningham, KCB, DSO** | 4 March 1941 | Military division | |
| | General Sir Archibald Percival Wavell, KCB, CMG, MC | 4 March 1941 | Military division | |
| | Field Marshal Sir John Greer Dill, KCB, CMG, DSO | 1 January 1942 | Military division | |
| | Sir Frank Edward Smith, GBE, KCB | 1 January 1942 | Civil division | |
| | Field Marshal Prince Henry, 1st Duke of Gloucester, KG, KT, KP, GCMG, GCVO | 25 February 1942 | Military division | |
| | General Sir Walter Venning, KCB, CMG, CBE, MC | 11 June 1942 | Military division | |
| | Air Chief Marshal Sir Charles Frederick Algernon Portal, KCB, DSO*, MC | 11 June 1942 | Military division | |
| | Sir Horace Perkins Hamilton, KCB | 11 June 1942 | Civil division | |
| | General Sir Harold Rupert Leofric George Alexander, KCB, CSI, DSO, MC | 11 November 1942 | Military division | |
| | General Sir Alan Francis Brooke, KCB, DSO* | 16 November 1942 | Military division | |
| | Air Marshal Sir Arthur William Tedder, KCB | 27 November 1942 | Military division | |
| | Admiral Sir William Milbourne James, KCB | 1 January 1944 | Military division | |
| | General Sir George James Giffard, KCB, DSO | 1 January 1944 | Military division | |
| | Sir Edward Ettingdene Bridges, KCB, MC | 1 January 1944 | Civil division | |
| | Vice-Admiral Sir Bruce Austin Fraser, KCB, KBE, RN | 5 January 1944 | Military division | |
| | General Sir Henry Maitland Wilson, GBE, KCB, DSO | 2 June 1944 | Military division | |
| | Admiral Sir James Fownes Somerville, KCB, KBE, DSO | 22 August 1944 | Military division | |
| | General Sir Frederick Alfred Pile, Bt., KCB, DSO, MC | 1 January 1945 | Military division | |
| | General Sir Claude John Eyre Auchinleck, GCIE, CB, CSI, DSO, OBE | 1 January 1945 | Military division | |
| | Sir Alexander Maxwell, KCB, KBE | 1 January 1945 | Civil division | |
| | Air Vice Marshal Sir Philip Woolcott Game, GCVO, GBE, KCB, KCMG, DSO, RAF | 2 May 1945 | Civil division | |
| | Admiral Sir Max Kennedy Horton, KCB, DSO, RN | 14 June 1945 | Military division | |
| | Field Marshal Sir Bernard Law Montgomery, KCB, DSO | 14 June 1945 | Military division | |
| | Air Chief Marshal Sir Arthur Travers Harris, KCB, OBE, AFC, RAF | 14 June 1945 | Military division | |
| | Admiral Sir John Henry Dacres Cunningham, KCB, MVO, DL, RN | 1 January 1946 | Military division | |
| | Admiral Sir Henry Ruthven Moore, KCB, CVO, DSO, RN | 1 January 1946 | Military division | |
| | General Sir Ronald Forbes Adam, Bt., KCB, DSO, OBE | 1 January 1946 | Military division | |
| | General Sir Bernard Charles Tolver Paget, KCB, DSO, MC | 1 January 1946 | Military division | |
| | General Thomas Sheridan Riddell-Webster, KCB, DSO, MC | 1 January 1946 | Military division | |
| | Air Chief Marshal Sir William Sholto Douglas, KCB, MC, DFC, RAF | 1 January 1946 | Military division | |
| | Air Chief Marshal Sir Edgar Rainey Ludlow-Hewitt, GBE, KCB, CMG, DSO, MC, ADC, RAF | 1 January 1946 | Military division | |
| | Sir Cyril William Hurcomb, KCB, KBE | 1 January 1946 | Civil division | |
| | H.H. Maharaja Sir Sri Jayachamarajendra Wadiyar Bahadur, GCSI, Maharaja of Mysore | 1 January 1946 | Civil division | |
| | Sir Arthur William Street, KCB, KBE, CMG, CIE, MC | 1 January 1946 | Civil division | |
| | General Sir Hastings Lionel Ismay, CH, KCB, DSO | 13 June 1946 | Military division | |
| | Sir John Donald Balfour Fergusson, KCB | 13 June 1946 | Civil division | |
| | Sir James Alan Noel Barlow, Bt., KCB, KBE | 1 January 1947 | Civil division | |
| | Admiral Sir Algernon Usborne Willis, KCB, KBE, DSO, RN | 6 June 1947 | Military division | |
| | General Sir Richard Nugent O'Connor, KCB, DSO, MC, ADC | 6 June 1947 | Military division | |
| | General Sir Daril Gerard Watson, KCB, CBE, MC, ADC | 6 June 1947 | Military division | |
| | Sir Archibald Rowlands, KCB, MBE | 6 June 1947 | Civil division | |
| | Admiral Sir Edward Neville Syfret, KCB, KBE, RN | 1 January 1948 | Military division | |
| | General Sir Montagu George North Stopford, KCB, KBE, DSO, MC, ADC | 1 January 1948 | Military division | |
| | Sir Thomas James Barnes | 1 January 1948 | Civil division | |
| | General Sir John Tredinnick Crocker, KCB, KBE, DSO, MC, ADC | 10 June 1948 | Military division | |
| | Air Chief Marshal Sir John Cotesworth Slessor, KCB, DSO, MC, RAF | 10 June 1948 | Military division | |
| | Sir Gilbert Francis Montriou Campion, KCB | 10 June 1948 | Civil division | |
| | Admiral Sir Harold Martin Burrough, KCB, KBE, DSO, RN | 1 January 1949 | Military division | |
| | General Sir William Duthie Morgan, KCB, DSO, MC | 1 January 1949 | Military division | |
| | Sir Henry Thomas Tizard, KCB, AFC, FRS | 1 January 1949 | Civil division | |
| | General Sir Richard Loudon McCreery, KCB, KBE, DSO, MC | 3 June 1949 | Military division | |
| | Sir John Harold Edmund Woods, KCB, MVO | 3 June 1949 | Civil division | |
| | Admiral Sir Arthur John Power, GBE, KCB, CVO, RN | 2 January 1950 | Military division | |
| | Field Marshal Sir William Joseph Slim, GBE, KCB, DSO, MC | 2 January 1950 | Military division | |
| | Sir William Scott Douglas, KCB, KBE | 2 January 1950 | Civil division | |
| | General Sir James Stuart Steele, KCB, KBE, DSO, MC, ADC | 2 June 1950 | Military division | |
| | Sir Bernard William Gilbert, KCB, KBE | 2 June 1950 | Civil division | |
| | Admiral Sir Rhoderick Robert McGrigor, KCB, DSO, RN | 1 January 1951 | Military division | |
| | General Sir Sidney Chevalier Kirkman, KCB, KBE, MC | 1 January 1951 | Military division | |
| | Air Chief Marshal Sir James Milne Robb, KCB, KBE, DSO, DFC, AFC, RAF | 1 January 1951 | Military division | |
| | Sir Godfrey Herbert Ince, KCB, KBE | 1 January 1951 | Civil division | |
| | General Sir John Harding, KCB, CBE, DSO, MC, ADC | 1 June 1951 | Military division | |
| | Sir Norman Craven Brook, KCB | 1 June 1951 | Civil division | |
| | Admiral Sir Philip Louis Vian, KCB, KBE, DSO, RN | 1 January 1952 | Military division | |
| | General Sir Brian Hubert Robertson, Bt., GBE, KCMG, KCVO, CB, DSO, MC, ADC | 1 January 1952 | Military division | |

=== Elizabeth II ===
| Image | Name | Date | Notes | References |
|---|---|---|---|---|
| | General Sir Gwilym Ivor Thomas, KCB, KBE, DSO, MC | 30 May 1952 | Military division | |
| | Admiral Sir John Hereward Edelsten, KCB, CBE, RN | 1 January 1953 | Military division | |
| | Air Chief Marshal Sir William Forster Dickson, KCB, KBE, DSO, DFC, RAF | 1 January 1953 | Military division | |
| | The Rt. Hon. Sir James Ulick Francis Canning Alexander, GCVO, KCB, CMG, OBE | 1 January 1953 | Civil division | |
| | Sir Ernest Arthur Gowers, GBE, KCB | 1 January 1953 | Civil division | |
| | Admiral Sir George Elvey Creasy, KCB, CBE, DSO, MVO, RN | 1 June 1953 | Military division | |
| | General Sir Charles Frederic Keightley, KCB, KBE, DSO | 1 June 1953 | Military division | |
| | General Sir Ouvry Lindfield Roberts, KCB, KBE, DSO, ADC | 1 June 1953 | Military division | |
| | Air Chief Marshal Sir Hugh William Lumsden Saunders, KCB, KBE, MC, DFC, MM, RAF | 1 June 1953 | Military division | |
| | The Rt. Hon. Sir Alan Frederick Lascelles, GCVO, KCB, CMG, MC | 1 June 1953 | Civil division | |
| | Sir William Strang, GCMG, KCB, MBE | 1 June 1953 | Civil division | |
| | General Sir Richard Nelson Gale, KCB, KBE, DSO, MC | 1 January 1954 | Military division | |
| | Sir Thomas Robert Gardiner, GBE, KCB | 1 January 1954 | Civil division | |
| | Admiral Sir Michael Maynard Denny, KCB, CBE, DSO, RN | 1 June 1954 | Military division | |
| | General Sir Cameron Gordon Graham Nicholson, KCB, KBE, DSO, MC | 1 June 1954 | Military division | |
| | Sir John Gerald Lang, KCB | 1 June 1954 | Civil division | |
| | Air Chief Marshal Sir Arthur Penrose Martyn Sanders, KCB, KBE, ADC, RAF | 1 January 1955 | Military division | |
| | Sir John Primatt Redcliffe Maud | 1 January 1955 | Civil division | |
| | Admiral Louis Francis Albert Victor Nicholas Mountbatten, 1st Earl Mountbatten of Burma, KG, GCSI, GCIE, GCVO, KCB, DSO, RN | 3 June 1955 | Military division | |
| | General Sir George Watkin Eben James Erskine, KCB, KBE, DSO | 3 June 1955 | Military division | |
| | General Sir Gerald Walter Robert Templer, GCMG, KCB, KBE, DSO | 3 June 1955 | Military division | |
| | Air Chief Marshal Sir Basil Edward Embry, KCB, KBE, DSO, AFC, RAF | 2 January 1956 | Military division | |
| | Sir Harold Corti Emmerson, KCB, KCVO | 2 January 1956 | Civil division | |
| | Admiral Sir Guy Grantham, KCB, CBE, DSO, RN | 25 May 1956 | Military division | |
| | General Eric Carden Robert Mansergh, KCB, KBE, MC | 25 May 1956 | Military division | |
| | Sir Ivone Augustine Kirkpatrick, GCMG, KCB | 25 May 1956 | Civil division | |
| | General Sir Charles Falkland Loewen, KCB, KBE, DSO, ADC | 1 January 1957 | Military division | |
| | General Sir Lashmer Gordon Whistler, KCB, KBE, DSO | 1 January 1957 | Military division | |
| | Air Chief Marshal Sir Dermot Alexander Boyle, KCVO, KBE, CB, AFC, RAF | 1 January 1957 | Military division | |
| | Admiral Sir Charles Edward Lambe, KCB, CVO, RN | 4 June 1957 | Military division | |
| | General Sir Francis Wogan Festing, KCB, KBE, DSO | 4 June 1957 | Military division | |
| | Air Chief Marshal Sir Ronald Ivelaw-Chapman, KCB, KBE, DFC, AFC, RAF | 4 June 1957 | Military division | |
| | Sir Frank Aubrey Newsam, KCB, KBE, CVO, MC | 4 June 1957 | Civil division | |
| | Admiral Sir John Arthur Symons Eccles, KCB, KCVO, CBE, RN | 1 January 1958 | Military division | |
| | Sir David Milne, KCB | 3 June 1958 | Civil division | |
| | General Sir Dudley Ward, KCB, KBE, DSO, ADC | 1 January 1959 | Military division | |
| | Air Chief Marshal Sir George Holroyd Mills, KCB, DFC, ADC, RAF | 1 January 1959 | Military division | |
| | Admiral Sir William Wellclose Davis, KCB, DSO, RN | 13 June 1959 | Military division | |
| | General Sir Hugh Charles Stockwell, KCB, KBE, DSO, ADC | 13 June 1959 | Military division | |
| | Air Chief Marshal Sir Claude Bernard Raymond Pelly, KCB, CBE, MC, ADC, RAF | 13 June 1959 | Military division | |
| | General Sir Geoffrey Kemp Bourne, KCB, KBE, CMG | 1 January 1960 | Military division | |
| | Air Chief Marshal Sir Harry Broadhurst, KCB, KBE, DSO, DFC, AFC, RAF | 1 January 1960 | Military division | |
| | Sir Roger Mellor Makins, GCMG, KCB | 1 January 1960 | Civil division | |
| | Admiral Sir Caspar John, KCB, RN | 3 June 1960 | Military division | |
| | General Sir James Cassels, KBE, CB, DSO, ADC | 1 January 1961 | Military division | |
| | Air Chief Marshal Sir Thomas Geoffrey Pike, KCB, CBE, DFC, RAF | 1 January 1961 | Military division | |
| | Admiral Sir John Peter Lorne Reid, KCB, CVO, RN | 2 June 1961 | Military division | |
| | General Sir Richard Amyatt Hull, KCB, DSO | 2 June 1961 | Military division | |
| | General Sir Horatius Murray, KBE, CB, DSO | 1 January 1962 | Military division | |
| | Air Marshal Sir Charles Elworthy, KCB, CBE, DSO, MVO, DFC, AFC, RAF | 1 January 1962 | Military division | |
| | Sir Alexander Johnston, KBE, CB | 1 January 1962 | Civil division | |
| | Admiral Sir Alexander Noel Campbell Bingley, KCB, OBE, RN | 25 May 1962 | Military division | |
| | General Sir Gerald Lathbury, KCB, DSO, MBE, ADC | 25 May 1962 | Military division | |
| | Sir Henry Drummond Hancock, KCB, KBE, CMG | 25 May 1962 | Civil division | |
| | General Sir Richard Wakefield Goodbody, KBE, CB, DSO, ADC | 1 January 1963 | Military division | |
| | Air Chief Marshal Sir Edmund Hudleston, KCB, CBE, ADC | 1 January 1963 | Military division | |
| | Sir Laurence Norman Helsby, KBE, CB | 1 January 1963 | Civil division | |
| | Admiral Sir John David Luce, KCB, DSO, OBE, RN | 31 May 1963 | Military division | |
| | Sir Harold Simcox Kent, KCB | 31 May 1963 | Civil division | |
| | Admiral Sir Deric Holland-Martin, KCB, DSO, DSC, RN | 1 January 1964 | Military division | |
| | Sir William Stuart Murrie, KBE, CB | 1 January 1964 | Civil division | |
| | General Sir Michael West, KCB, DSO, ADC | 13 June 1964 | Military division | |
| | Air Chief Marshal Sir Denis Barnett, KCB, CBE, DFC, RAF | 13 June 1964 | Military division | |
| | Admiral Sir Charles Edward Madden, Bt., KCB, RN | 1 January 1965 | Military division | |
| | General Sir William Gurdon Stirling, KCB, CBE, DSO, ADC | 1 January 1965 | Military division | |
| | Sir Thomas Padmore, KCB | 1 January 1965 | Civil division | |
| | Admiral Sir Varyl Cargill Begg, KCB, DSO, DSC, RN | 12 June 1965 | Military division | |
| | General Sir Charles Phibbs Jones, KCB, CBE, MC, ADC | 12 June 1965 | Military division | |
| | Air Chief Marshal Sir William Lawrence Mary MacDonald, KCB, CBE, DFC, ADC, RAF | 12 June 1965 | Military division | |
| | Air Chief Marshal Sir Wallace Hart Kyle, KCB, CBE, DSO, DFC, RAF | 1 January 1966 | Military division | |
| | Sir Noël Kilpatrick Hutton, KCB, QC | 1 January 1966 | Civil division | |
| | General Sir Reginald Hackett Hewetson, KCB, CBE, DSO | 11 June 1966 | Military division | |
| | Admiral Sir Desmond Parry Dreyer, KCB, CBE, DSC, RN | 1 January 1967 | Military division | |
| | General Sir Charles Richardson, KCB, CBE, DSO | 1 January 1967 | Military division | |
| | Air Chief Marshal Sir John Grandy, KCB, KBE, DSO, RAF | 1 January 1967 | Military division | |
| | General Sir John Winthrop Hackett, KCB, CBE, DSO*, MC | 10 June 1967 | Military division | |
| | Sir Richard Royle Powell, KCB, KBE, CMG | 10 June 1967 | Civil division | |
| | Admiral Sir Michael Le Fanu, KCB, DSC, RN | 1 January 1968 | Military division | |
| | General Sir Geoffrey Harding Baker, KCB, CMG, CBE, MC | 1 January 1968 | Military division | |
| | Air Chief Marshal Sir John Gilbert Davis, KCB, OBE, ADC, RAF | 1 January 1968 | Military division | |
| | Lieutenant Colonel The Rt. Hon. Sir Michael Edward Adeane, GCVO, KCB | 1 January 1968 | Military division | |
| | Sir Burke St John Trend, KCB, CVO | 1 January 1968 | Military division | |
| | General Sir Alan Jolly, KCB, CBE, DSO | 31 May 1968 | Military division | |
| | Sir William Armstrong, KCB, MVO | 31 May 1968 | Civil division | |
| | Admiral John Byng Frewen, KCB, RN | 1 January 1969 | Military division | |
| | Air Chief Marshal Sir Augustus Walker | 1 January 1969 | Military division | |
| | General Sir Charles Harington | 6 June 1969 | Military division | |
| | Sir Ludovic James Dunnett, KCB, CMG | 6 June 1969 | Civil division | |
| | Admiral Sir John Fitzroy Duyland Bush, KCB, DSC, RN | 1 January 1970 | Military division | |
| | General Sir Geoffrey Musson, KCB, CBE, DSO | 1 January 1970 | Military division | |
| | Admiral Sir Peter John Hill-Norton, KCB, RN | 13 June 1970 | Military division | |
| | General Sir Richard Michael Power Carver, KCB, CBE, DSO*, MC | 13 June 1970 | Military division | |
| | Air Chief Marshal Sir Brian Kenyon Burnett, KCB, DFC, AFC, ADC, RAF | 13 June 1970 | Military division | |
| | Sir Philip Allen, KCB | 13 June 1970 | Civil division | |
| | Admiral Sir Michael Patrick Pollock, KCB, MVO, DSC, RN | 1 January 1971 | Military division | |
| | General Sir Geoffrey Richard Desmond Fitzpatrick, KCB, DSO, MBE, MC, ADC | 1 January 1971 | Military division | |
| | Air Chief Marshal Sir Denis Frank Spotswood, KCB, CBE, DSO, DFC, ADC, RAF | 1 January 1971 | Military division | |
| | Sir George Edward Godber, KCB, FRCP | 1 January 1971 | Civil division | |
| | Sir Edmund Gerald Compton, KCB, KBE | 4 June 1971 | Civil division | |
| | Admiral Horace Rochfort Law, KCB, OBE, DSC, RN | 1 January 1972 | Military division | |
| | General Sir Herbert John Mogg, KCB, CBE, DSO, ADC | 1 January 1972 | Military division | |
| | General Sir John Antony Jervis Read, KCB, CBE, DSO, MC, ADC | 23 May 1972 | Military division | |
| | Air Chief Marshal Sir Frederick Rosier, KCB, CBE, DSO, ADC | 23 May 1972 | Military division | |
| | Sir Arnold William France, KCB | 23 May 1972 | Civil division | |
| | General Sir Peter Mervyn Hunt, KCB, DSO, OBE | 1 January 1973 | Military division | |
| | Air Chief Marshal Christopher Neil Foxley-Norris, KCB, DSO, OBE, RAF | 1 January 1973 | Military division | |
| | Sir Douglas Albert Vivian Allen, KCB | 1 January 1973 | Civil division | |
| | Lieutenant-General Sir Harry Craufurd Tuzo, KCB, OBE, MC | 2 June 1973 | Military division | |
| | Admiral Sir Edward Beckwith Ashmore, KCB, DSC, RN | 1 January 1974 | Military division | |
| | Air Chief Marshal Sir Andrew Humphrey, KCB, OBE, DFC, AFC, RAF | 1 January 1974 | Military division | |
| | Sir Charles Craik Cunningham, KCB, KBE, CVO | 1 January 1974 | Civil division | |
| | Sir Antony Alexander Part, KCB, MBE | 7 June 1974 | Civil division | |
| | Lieutenant H.R.H Charles Philip Arthur George, Prince of Wales, KG, GCB, ADC, RN | 10 December 1974 | Military division | |
| | Admiral Sir Anthony Templer Frederick Griffin Griffin, KCB, RN | 1 January 1975 | Military division | |
| | General Sir Cecil Hugh Blacker, KCB, OBE, MC, ADC | 1 January 1975 | Military division | |
| | Air Chief Marshal Sir Henry Neil George Wheeler, KCB, CBE, DSO, DFC, AFC, RAF | 1 January 1975 | Military division | |
| | Sir Philip Rogers, KCB, CMG | 6 June 1975 | Civil division | |
| | Princess Alice, Duchess of Gloucester, GCB, CI, GCVO, GBE | 1975 | Civil division | |
| | Lieutenant-General Sir Frank Douglas King, KCB, MBE | 1 January 1976 | Military division | |
| | Sir Arthur Lucius Michael Cary, KCB | 1 January 1976 | Civil division | |
| | Admiral Sir Terence Thornton Lewin, KCB, MVO, DSC, ADC, RN | 4 June 1976 | Military division | |
| | General Sir Roland Christopher Gibbs, KCB, CBE, DSO, MC | 4 June 1976 | Military division | |
| | Air Chief Marshal Sir Neil Cameron, KCB, CBE, DSO, DFC, DFC | 4 June 1976 | Military division | |
| | General Sir John Houghton Gibbon | 1 January 1977 | Military division | |
| | Admiral Sir David Williams, KCB, ADC, RN | 11 June 1977 | Military division | |
| | Lieutenant-General Sir David George House, KCB, CBE, MC | 11 June 1977 | Military division | |
| | Air Chief Marshal Sir Douglas Charles Lowe, GCB, DFC, AFC | 11 June 1977 | Military division | |
| | Sir John Joseph Benedict Hunt, KCB | 11 June 1977 | Civil division | |
| | Lieutenant Colonel The Rt. Hon. Sir Martin Michael Charles Charteris, GCVO, KCB, OBE, QSO, PC | 1977 | Civil division | |
| | Field Marshal The Lord Bramall, KG, GCB, OBE, MC, DL | 1979 | Military division | |
| | General Sir Peter Whiteley, GCB, OBE, DL | 1979 | Military division | |
| | Air Chief Marshal Sir David Evans, GCB, CBE | 1979 | Military division | |
| | Ian Bancroft, Baron Bancroft, GCB | 1979 | Civil division | |
| | Sir Douglas Wass, GCB | 1980 | Civil division | |
| | Admiral Sir James Eberle, GCB | 1981 | Military division | |
| | General Sir Robert Ford, GCB, CBE | 1981 | Military division | |
| | Marshal of the Royal Air Force Sir Keith Williamson, GCB, AFC | 1982 | Military division | |
| | Admiral of the Fleet John Fieldhouse, Baron Fieldhouse, GCB, GBE | 1982 | Military division | |
| | The Lord Armstrong of Ilminster, GCB, CVO | 1983 | Civil division | |
| | Admiral Sir Desmond Cassidi, GCB | 1983 | Military division | |
| | Sir William Fraser, GCB | 1984 | Civil division | |
| | Marshal of the Royal Air Force The Lord Craig of Radley, GCB, OBE | 1984 | Military division | |
| | General Sir George Cooper, GCB, MC, DL | 1984 | Military division | |
| | Sir Kenneth Stowe, GCB, CVO | 1986 | Civil division | |
| | Marshal of the Royal Air Force Sir Peter Harding, GCB | 1988 | Military division | |
| | Field Marshal Sir John Chapple, GCB, CBE | 1988 | Military division | |
| | Sir Clive Whitmore, GCB, CVO | 1988 | Civil division | |
| | Sir Brian Hayes, GCB | 1988 | Civil division | |
| | Sir Peter Middleton, GCB | 1989 | Civil division | |
| | Air Chief Marshal Sir Patrick Hine, GCB, GBE | 1989 | Military division | |
| | Sir Derek Oulton, GCB, QC | 1989 | Civil division | |
| | Sir William Heseltine, GCB, GCVO, AC, QSO | 1990 | Civil division | |
| | Admiral of the Fleet Sir Benjamin Bathurst, GCB, DL | 1991 | Military division | |
| | Air Chief Marshal Sir David Parry-Evans, GCB, CBE | 1991 | Military division | |
| | General Sir Brian Kenny, GCB, CBE | 1991 | Military division | |
| | Sir Michael Quinlan, GCB | 1991 | Civil division | |
| | Field Marshal The Lord Inge, KG, GCB, PC, DL | 1992 | Military division | |
| | Admiral Sir Jock Slater, GCB, LVO, DL | 1992 | Military division | |
| | The Lord Butler of Brockwell, KG, GCB, CVO, PC | 1992 | Civil division | |
| | Sir Terence Heiser, GCB | 1992 | Civil division | |
| | Air Chief Marshal Sir Michael Graydon, GCB, CBE | 1993 | Military division | |
| | Admiral Sir John Kerr, GCB, DL | 1993 | Military division | |
| | General The Lord Ramsbotham, GCB, CBE | 1993 | Civil division | |
| | Field Marshal The Lord Guthrie of Craigiebank, GCB, GCVO, OBE, DL | 1994 | Military division | |
| | Sir Clifford Boulton, GCB | 1994 | Civil division | |
| | Terence Burns, Baron Burns, GCB | 1995 | Civil division | |
| | General Sir John Wilsey, GCB, CBE, DL | 1995 | Military division | |
| | Air Chief Marshal Sir Michael Alcock, GCB, KBE | 1995 | Military division | |
| | Sir Peter Gregson, GCB | 1995 | Civil division | |
| | Sir Anthony Battishill, GCB | 1996 | Civil division | |
| | Air Chief Marshal Sir Richard Johns, GCB, KCVO, CBE | 1997 | Military division | |
| | General Sir Roger Wheeler, GCB, CBE | 1997 | Military division | |
| | The Lord Fellowes, GCB, GCVO, QSO, PC | 1998 | Civil division | |
| | Sir John Chilcot, GCB | 1998 | Civil division | |
| | Admiral of the Fleet The Lord Boyce, KG, GCB, OBE, DL | 1999 | Military division | |
| | Field Marshal The Lord Walker of Aldringham, GCB, CMG, CBE, DL | 1999 | Military division | |
| | General Sir Jeremy Mackenzie, GCB, OBE, DL | 1999 | Military division | |
| | Sir Nigel Wicks, GCB, CVO, CBE | 1999 | Civil division | |
| | Air Chief Marshal Sir Peter Squire, GCB, DFC, AFC, DL | 2001 | Military division | |
| | The Lord Wilson of Dinton, GCB | 2001 | Civil division | |
| | Admiral Sir Nigel Essenhigh, GCB, DL | 2002 | Military division | |
| | Sir Hayden Phillips, GCB | 2002 | Civil division | |
| | Sir David Omand, GCB | 2004 | Civil division | |
| | Admiral The Lord West of Spithead, GCB, DSC, PC | 2004 | Military division | |
| | General Sir Mike Jackson, GCB, CBE, DSO, DL | 2004 | Military division | |
| | Marshal of the Royal Air Force The Lord Stirrup, KG, GCB, AFC | 2005 | Military division | |
| | Air Chief Marshal Sir Peter Terry, GCB, AFC | 2006 | Military division | |
| | Sir Richard Mottram, GCB | 2006 | Civil division | |
| | The Lord Janvrin, GCB, GCVO, QSO, PC | 2007 | Civil division | |
| | General The Lord Dannatt, GCB, CBE, MC, DL | 2008 | Military division | |
| | Air Chief Marshal Sir Glenn Torpy, GCB, CBE, DSO | 2008 | Military division | |
| | Admiral Sir Jonathon Band, GCB, DL | 2008 | Military division | |
| | Admiral Sir Mark Stanhope, GCB, OBE, ADC, DL | 2010 | Military division | |
| | Field Marshal The Lord Richards of Herstmonceux, GCB, CBE, DSO, DL | 2010 | Military division | |
| | Sir David Normington, GCB | 2011 | Civil division | |
| | The Lord O'Donnell, GCB | 2011 | Civil division | |
| | Field Marshal The Lord Houghton of Richmond, GCB, CBE, ADC Gen | 2011 | Military division | |
| | Air Chief Marshal Sir Stephen Dalton, GCB, ADC | 2012 | Military division | |
| | General Sir Peter Wall, GCB, CBE, DL | 2013 | Military division | |
| | The Lord Macpherson of Earl's Court, GCB | 2015 | Civil division | |
| | Admiral Sir George Zambellas, GCB, DSC, ADC, DL | 2016 | Military division | |
| | Air Chief Marshal Sir Andrew Pulford, GCB, CBE, ADC, DL | 2016 | Military division | |
| | The Lord Geidt, GCB, GCVO, OBE, QSO, PC | 2018 | Civil division | |
| | The Lord Heywood of Whitehall, GCB, CVO | 2018 | Civil division | |
| | General Sir Nicholas Carter, GCB, CBE, DSO, ADC Gen | 2019 | Military division | |
| | Dame Sally Davies, GCB, DBE, FRS, FMedSci | 2019 | Civil division | |
| | Air Chief Marshal Sir Stephen Hillier, GCB, CBE, DFC, ADC | 2020 | Military division | |

=== Charles III ===
| Image | Name | Date | Notes | References |
|---|---|---|---|---|
| | Sir Tom Scholar, GCB | 2023 | Civil division | |
| | The Lord Young of Old Windsor, GCB, GCVO, PC | 2023 | Civil division | |
| | General Sir Mark Carleton-Smith, GCB, CBE | 2023 | Military division | |
| | Lieutenant Colonel The Prince of Wales, KG, KT, GCB, PC, ADC | 2024 | Military Division | |

== Honorary knights and dames grand cross ==
=== Military division ===
| Image | Name | Year | Notes |
|---|---|---|---|
| | Prince Sergey Grigorievich Volkonsky, GCB | 1819 | General in the Russian Army |
| | Count Mikhail Semyonovich Vorontsov, GCB | 1819 | General in the Russian Army |
| | Ernest Karl, Count of Zieten, GCB | 1819 | General in the Prussian Army |
| | Johann Maria Philipp Frimont, GCB | 1819 | General in the Austrian Army |
| | Prince Bernhard of Saxe-Weimar-Eisenach, GCB | 1830 | |
| | Count Ernest of Münster, GCB | 1831 | Minister of State and Cabinet of Hanover |
| | Archduke Charles, Duke of Teschen, GCB | 1834 | |
| | Ludwig, Count of Wallmoden-Gimborn, GCB | 1834 | |
| | Prince Ernest Frederick of Hesse-Philippsthal-Barchfeld, GCB | 1835 | |
| | Louis William, Landgrave of Hesse-Homburg, GCB | 1836 | |
| | Prince Ferdinand of Saxe-Coburg and Gotha, GCB | 1839 | |
| | Baldomero Espartero, Prince of Vergara, GCB | 1840 | |
| | Prince Waldemar of Prussia, GCB | 1846 | |
| | Omar Pasha, GCB | 1854 | General in the Ottoman Army |
| | François Certain Canrobert, GCB | 1855 | |
| | Prince Napoléon Bonaparte, GCB | 1855 | |
| | Jean-Baptiste Philibert Vaillant, GCB | 1855 | French Minister of War |
| | Alfonso Ferrero La Marmora, GCB | 1855 | Commander-in-Chief of the Sardinian Forces in the Crimea |
| | Aimable Pélissier, GCB | 1855 | Commander-in-Chief of the French Forces in the Crimea |
| | Pierre Bosquet, GCB | 1856 | General in the French Army |
| | Charles de Salles, GCB | 1856 | General in the French Army |
| | Patrice de MacMahon, GCB | 1856 | General in the French Army |
| | Auguste Regnaud de Saint-Jean d'Angély, GCB | 1856 | General in the French Army |
| | Louis-Michel Morris, GCB | 1856 | General in the French Army |
| | Prince William of Prussia (later German Emperor), KG, GCB | 1857 | |
| | Ferdinand-Alphonse Hamelin, GCB | 1857 | French Minister of Marine and the Colonies |
| | Jayajirao Scindia, GCB | 1877 | Maharaja of Gwalior |
| | Prince Friedrich Karl of Prussia, GCB | 1878 | |
| | Prince Alexander of Hesse and by Rhine, GCB | 1885 | |
| | Alexander Joseph of Bulgaria, GCB | 1886 | Replaced a Civil GCB from 1879 |
| | Prince Komatsu Akihito, GCB | 1890 | General-in-Chief of the Japanese Imperial Household Troops |
| | Prince Heinrich of Hesse and by Rhine, GCB | 1892 | |
| | Luitpold, Prince Regent of Bavaria, GCB | 1901 | |
| | Alfred von Waldersee, GCB | 1901 | |
| | Menelik II, GCB, GCMG | 1902 | Emperor of Ethiopia |
| | Friedrich, Prince of Waldeck and Pyrmont, GCB | 1904 | |
| | Archduke Friedrich, Duke of Teschen, GCB | 1904 | |
| | Nogi Maresuke, GCB, GCVO | 1911 | |
| | Ferdinand Foch, GCB, OM, DSO | 1914 | |
| | Luigi Cadorna, GCB | 1915 | |
| | Nicholas II of Russia, KG, GCB | 1916 | |
| | John J. Pershing, GCB | 1918 | |
| | Joseph Joffre, GCB, OM | ? | |
| | Chiang Kai-shek, GCB | 1942 | |
| | Dwight D. Eisenhower, GCB, OM | 1943 | President of the United States (Civil Division in 1957) |
| | Douglas MacArthur, GCB | 1943 | |
| | Ernest King, GCB | 1945 | |
| | Chester W. Nimitz, GCB | 1945 | |
| | George Marshall, GCB | 1945 | |
| | Henry H. Arnold, GCB | 1945 | |
| | Georgy Zhukov, GCB | 1945 | |
| | Jean de Lattre de Tassigny, GCB, MC | 1952 | |
| | Josip Broz Tito, GCB | 1972 | President of Yugoslavia |
| | Suharto, GCB | 1974 | President of Indonesia |
| | Ibrahim Babangida, GCB | 1989 | President of Nigeria |
| | Abdullah II of Jordan, GCB, GCMG, KCVO | 2001 | King of Jordan |

=== Civil division ===
| Image | Name | Year | Notes |
|---|---|---|---|
| | Ernst I, Prince of Hohenlohe-Langenburg, GCB | 1848 | |
| | Frederick William, The Hereditary Grand Duke of Mecklenburg-Strelitz, KG, GCB | 1848 | Later Frederick William, Grand Duke of Mecklenburg-Strelitz |
| | Prince Christian of Denmark, KG, GCB | 1863 | Later Christian IX of Denmark |
| | Muhammad III as-Sadiq, GCB | 1865 | Bey of Tunis |
| | Prince Francis of Teck, GCB, GCVO | 1866 | Later Francis, Duke of Teck |
| | Isma'il Pasha, GCB, GCSI | 1866 | Khedive of Egypt |
| | Hermann, Prince of Hohenlohe-Langenburg, GCB | 1867 | |
| | Adolphus Frederick, Hereditary Grand Duke of Mecklenburg-Strelitz, GCB | 1877 | Later Adolphus Frederick V, Grand Duke of Mecklenburg-Strelitz |
| | Prince Alexander Joseph of Battenberg, GCB | 1879 | Substituted for a Military GCB in 1886 |
| | Prince Philipp of Saxe-Coburg and Gotha, GCB | 1885 | |
| | Grand Duke Sergei Alexandrovich of Russia, GCB | 1887 | |
| | Ernest Louis, Hereditary Grand Duke of Hesse, GCB | 1887 | Later Ernest Louis, Grand Duke of Hesse |
| | Bernard, Hereditary Prince of Saxe-Meiningen, GCB | 1887 | Later Bernhard III, Duke of Saxe-Meiningen |
| | Tewfik Pasha, GCB, GCSI | 1887 | Khedive of Egypt |
| | Frederick, Crown Prince of Denmark, KG, GCB, GCVO | 1888 | |
| | Mirza Ali Asghar Khan Amin al-Soltan, GCB | 1889 | Grand Vizier of Persia |
| | Auguste, Baron Lambermont, GCB | 1890 | |
| | Prince Aribert of Anhalt, GCB | 1891 | |
| | Adolf I, Prince of Schaumburg-Lippe, GCB | 1892 | |
| | Ferdinand, Hereditary Prince of Romania, KG, GCB, GCVO | 1893 | Later Ferdinand I of Romania |
| | Abdur Rahman Khan, GCB | 1893 | Emir of Afghanistan |
| | Prince Carl of Denmark, KG, GCB, GCVO, GCStJ | 1896 | Later Haakon VII of Norway |
| | Prince Frederick Charles of Hesse, GCB | 1897 | |
| | Ernest, Hereditary Prince of Hohenlohe-Langenburg, GCB | 1897 | Later Ernst II, Prince of Hohenlohe-Langenburg |
| | Prince George of Greece and Denmark, GCB | 1900 | |
| | Grand Duke Michael Alexandrovich of Russia, KG, GCB | 1901 | |
| | Archduke Franz Ferdinand of Austria, KG, GCB | 1901 | |
| | Gustaf, Crown Prince of Sweden and Norway, KG, GCB | 1901 | From 1907, King Gustaf V of Sweden |
| | Abdelaziz of Morocco, GCB | 1901 | Sultan of Morocco |
| | Prince Valdemar of Denmark, GCB | 1901 | |
| | Itō Hirobumi, GCB | 1902 | |
| | Prince Arisugawa Takehito, GCB | 1902 | |
| | Mahbub Ali Khan, Asaf Jah VI, GCB, GCSI | 1903 | Nizam of Hyderabad |
| | Prince Carlos of Bourbon-Two Sicilies, GCB, GCVO | 1903 | |
| | Gustaf Adolf, Crown Prince of Sweden, KG, GCB, GCVO | 1905 | From 1950, King Gustaf VI Adolf of Sweden |
| | Porfirio Díaz, GCB | 1906 | President of Mexico |
| | Duke Henry of Mecklenburg-Schwerin, GCB | 1907 | Prince consort of the Netherlands |
| | Fuad I of Egypt, GCB | 1917 | King of Egypt |
| | Hirohito, KG, GCB, GCVO | 1921 | Emperor of Japan |
| | Benito Mussolini, GCB | 1923 | Prime Minister of Italy (expelled in 1940) |
| | Haile Selassie I, KG, GCB, GCMG, GCVO | 1924 | Emperor of Ethiopia |
| | Jayachamarajendra Wadiyar, GCB, GCSI | 1947 | Maharaja of Mysore |
| | Francisco Craveiro Lopes, GCB | 1955 | President of Portugal |
| | Dwight D. Eisenhower, GCB, OM | 1957 | President of the United States (Military Division in 1945) |
| | René Coty, GCB | 1957 | President of France |
| | Prince Bernhard of Lippe-Biesterfeld, GCB, GCVO | 1958 | Prince consort of the Netherlands |
| | Theodor Heuss, GCB | 1958 | President of West Germany |
| | Giovanni Gronchi, GCB | 1961 | President of Italy |
| | Eduardo Frei Montalva, GCB | 1965 | President of Chile |
| | Artur da Costa e Silva, GCB | 1968 | President of Brazil |
| | Franz Jonas, GCB | 1969 | President of Austria |
| | Giuseppe Saragat, GCB | 1969 | President of Italy |
| | Urho Kekkonen, GCB | 1969 | President of Finland |
| | Abdul Halim of Kedah, GCB, KStJ | 1972 | Yang di-Pertuan Agong |
| | Georges Pompidou, GCB | 1972 | President of France |
| | Luis Echeverría, GCB | 1973 | President of Mexico |
| | Mobutu Sese Seko, GCB | 1973 | President of Zaire |
| | Ernesto Geisel, GCB | 1976 | President of Brazil |
| | Valéry Giscard d'Estaing, GCB | 1976 | President of France |
| | Nicolae Ceaușescu, GCB | 1978 | President of Romania (expelled 24 December 1989) |
| | Walter Scheel, GCB | 1978 | President of the Federal Republic of Germany |
| | António Ramalho Eanes, GCB | 1978 | President of Portugal |
| | Khalifa bin Hamad Al Thani, GCB, GCMG | 1979 | Emir of Qatar |
| | Hassan II of Morocco, GCB | 1980 | King of Morocco |
| | Qaboos bin Said al Said, GCB, GCMG, GCVO, GCStJ | 1982 | Sultan of Oman |
| | Isa bin Salman Al Khalifa, GCB, KCMG | 1984 | Emir of Bahrain |
| | François Mitterrand, GCB | 1984 | President of France |
| | Hastings Banda, GCB | 1985 | President of Malawi |
| | Ronald Reagan, GCB | 1989 | President of the United States |
| | Azlan Shah of Perak, GCB, KStJ | 1989 | Yang di-Pertuan Agong |
| | Vigdís Finnbogadóttir, GCB, GCMG | 1990 | President of Iceland |
| | Francesco Cossiga, GCB | 1990 | President of Italy |
| | Lech Wałęsa, GCB | 1991 | President of Poland |
| | Hassanal Bolkiah, GCB, GCMG | 1992 | Sultan of Brunei |
| | Richard von Weizsäcker, GCB | 1992 | President of Germany |
| | George H. W. Bush, GCB | 1993 | President of the United States |
| | Robert Mugabe, GCB | 1994 | President of Zimbabwe (expelled 25 June 2008) |
| | Jaber Al-Ahmad Al-Sabah, GCB, GCMG | 1995 | Emir of Kuwait |
| | Martti Ahtisaari, GCB | 1995 | President of Finland |
| | Jacques Chirac, GCB | 1996 | President of France |
| | Aleksander Kwaśniewski, GCB, GCMG | 1996 | President of Poland |
| | Fernando Henrique Cardoso, GCB | 1997 | President of Brazil |
| | Ja'afar of Negeri Sembilan, GCB | 1998 | Yang di-Pertuan Agong |
| | Roman Herzog, GCB | 1998 | President of Germany |
| | Kim Dae-jung, GCB | 1999 | President of South Korea |
| | Árpád Göncz, GCB, KCMG | 1999 | President of Hungary |
| | Henrik, Prince Consort of Denmark, GCB, GCMG, GCVO | 2000 | Consort of the Danish monarch |
| | Carlo Azeglio Ciampi, GCB | 2000 | President of Italy |
| | Thabo Mbeki, GCB, GCMG | 2001 | President of South Africa |
| | Olusegun Obasanjo, GCB | 2003 | President of Nigeria |
| | Horst Köhler, GCB | 2004 | President of Germany |
| | Roh Moo-hyun, GCB | 2004 | President of South Korea |
| | Luiz Inácio Lula da Silva, GCB | 2006 | President of Brazil |
| | Vaira Vīķe-Freiberga, GCB | 2006 | President of Latvia |
| | Valdas Adamkus, GCB | 2006 | President of Lithuania |
| | Toomas Hendrik Ilves, GCB | 2006 | President of Estonia |
| | John Kufuor, GCB | 2007 | President of Ghana |
| | Abdullah Gül, GCB | 2008 | President of Turkey |
| | Nicolas Sarkozy, GCB | 2008 | President of France |
| | Danilo Türk, GCB | 2008 | President of Slovenia |
| | Felipe Calderón, GCB | 2009 | President of Mexico |
| | Jacob Zuma, GCB | 2010 | President of South Africa |
| | Hamad bin Khalifa Al Thani, GCB, GCMG | 2010 | Emir of Qatar |
| | Khalifa bin Zayed Al Nahyan, GCB, GCMG | 2010 | President of the United Arab Emirates |
| | Susilo Bambang Yudhoyono, GCB, AC | 2012 | President of Indonesia |
| | Sabah Al-Ahmad Al-Jaber Al-Sabah, GCB | 2012 | Emir of Kuwait |
| | Park Geun-hye, GCB | 2013 | President of South Korea |
| | François Hollande, GCB | 2014 | President of France |
| | Tony Tan, GCB | 2014 | President of Singapore |
| | Enrique Peña Nieto, GCB | 2015 | President of Mexico |
| | Joachim Gauck, GCB | 2015 | President of Germany |
| | Juan Manuel Santos, GCB | 2016 | President of Colombia |
| | Cyril Ramaphosa, GCB | 2022 | President of South Africa |
| | Frank-Walter Steinmeier, GCB | 2023 | President of Germany |
| | Emmanuel Macron, GCB | 2023 | President of France |
| | Yoon Suk Yeol, GCB | 2023 | President of South Korea |
| | Tamim bin Hamad Al Thani, GCB | 2024 | Emir of Qatar |
| | Haitham bin Tariq, GCB, GCMG, GCVO | 2026 | Sultan of Oman |

== See also ==
- List of knights and ladies of the Garter
- List of knights and ladies of the Thistle
- List of knights and dames grand cross of the Order of St Michael and St George
- List of knights grand cross of the Order of the British Empire
