= Norman Price =

Norman Price may refer to:

- Norman Mills Price (1877–1951), illustrator
- Norman Price (footballer) (1904-1977), see List of Oldham Athletic A.F.C. players (25–99 appearances)
- Norman Price (civil servant) (1915–2007), British civil servant
- Norman Price (American football) (born 1994), American football lineman
- Norman Price (Fireman Sam), a character in the children's animated TV series Fireman Sam
