= Thomas Williams Phillips =

Sir Thomas Williams Phillips (20 April 1883 – 21 September 1966) was a senior official in the Civil Service.

Phillips, a Welshman, was educated at Machynlleth County School and Jesus College, Oxford, where he obtained a first-class Bachelor of Arts degree in Literae Humaniores. He joined the Civil Service in 1906, working initially in the field of copyright law. He was called to the bar by Gray's Inn in 1913. He moved to the Ministry of Labour in 1919, serving as Permanent Secretary from 1935 to 1944. He then worked in the Ministry of National Insurance until 1948, becoming Chairman of the Central Land Board and of the War Damage Commission in 1949. He held these positions until 1959. He was also Chairman of the National Joint Council for Local Authorities, Administrative, Professional. Technical and Clerical Services (1951–1963) and Chairman of the War Works Commission (1949–1964). He was awarded the CBE in 1918, knighted with the award of the KBE in 1934 and advanced to GBE in 1946. He was also awarded the CB in 1922 and advanced to KCB in 1936. He was made an Honorary Fellow of Jesus College, Oxford in 1948, was made a Commander of the Belgian Order of the Crown and was awarded an honorary doctorate by the University of Wales in 1946. He died on 21 September 1966.

Government offices
Preceded by Sir Francis Floud	Permanent Secretary of the Ministry of Labour; 1935–1940	Succeeded by himself as Permanent Secretary, Ministry of Labour and National Service
Preceded by himself as Permanent Secretary, Ministry of Labour	Permanent Secretary of the Ministry of Labour and National Service; 1940–1944	Succeeded by Sir Godfrey Ince
