= Norman Price (civil servant) =

British civil servant

Sir Norman Charles Price, KCB (5 January 1915 – 19 February 2007) was a British civil servant.

Born on 5 January 1915, he attended Plaistow Secondary School before entering the civil service in 1933 as an executive officer in HM Customs and Excise. He moved to the Board of Inland Revenue in 1939 as a tax inspector; from 1968 to 1973 he was its deputy chairman, and then in 1973 he succeeded Sir Arnold France as its chairman. He was seen as an "insider", contrasted with several of his immediate predecessors who had been Treasury officials. This was "seen as an aid to carrying through" reorganisation plans resulting from the government's proposed tax reforms and staff cuts. He retired in 1976, and was succeeded by Sir William Pile. Price was a member of the European Court of Auditors (ECA) from October 1977 to October 1983; he was the first UK member of the ECA and acted as its president from October to November 1977.

Having been appointed a Companion of the Order of the Bath (CB) in the 1969 Birthday Honours, he was promoted to Knight Commander (KCB) in the 1975 Birthday Honours. He died on 19 February 2007.

Government offices
| Preceded by Sir Arnold France | Chairman, Board of Inland Revenue; 1973–1976 | Succeeded by Sir William Pile |
| Preceded by None | President, European Court of Auditors; 1977 | Succeeded by Michael Murphy |
