= Harold Emmerson =

English civil servant (1896–1984)

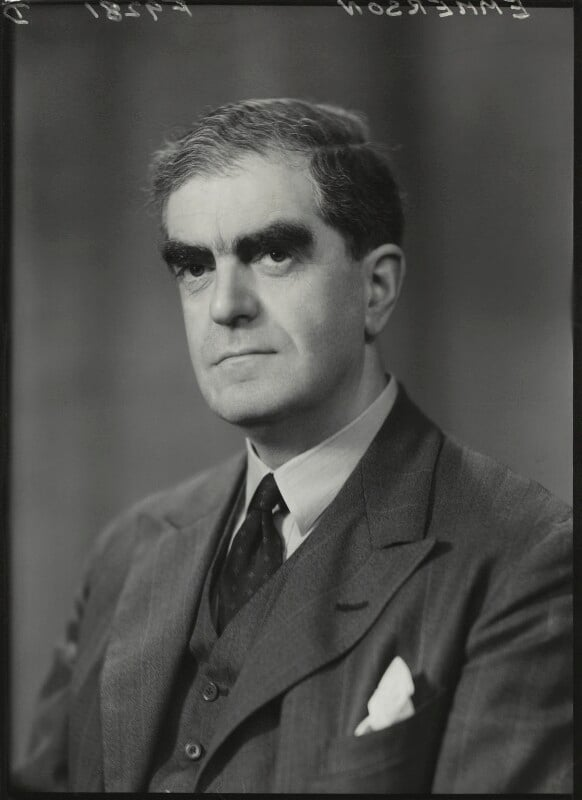
Emmerson in 1947

Sir Harold Corti Emmerson, GCB, KCVO (7 April 1896 – 2 August 1984) was an English civil servant. He entered the civil service as a clerk before serving in the Royal Marine Artillery during the First World War. After demobilisation, he was given a post in the Ministry of Labour. He was the Chief Industrial Commissioner from 1942 to 1944 and Director-General of Manpower from 1944 to 1946 before serving as Permanent Secretary of the Ministry of Works from 1946 to 1956 and Permanent Secretary of the Ministry of Labour from 1956 to 1959.

Government offices
Preceded by Sir Godfrey Ince	Permanent Secretary of the Ministry of Labour and National Service; 1956–1959	Succeeded by Sir Laurence Helsby as Permanent Secretary, Ministry of Labour
