= Henry Hancock (civil servant) =

English Civil Servant

Sir Henry Drummond Hancock, GCB, KBE, CMG (17 September 1895 – 24 July 1965) was an English civil servant.

Born on 17 September 1895, he studied at Exeter College, Oxford, before serving in the First World War, including in the Intelligence Corps. He entered the civil service in 1920 as an administrator in the Ministry of Labour; his time there coincided with the General Strike of 1926 and the rising unemployment of the later interwar years. He was engaged with attempts to reduce unemployment and redistribute the workforce from depressed areas to expanding ones, and was involved in drafting legislation setting up the Unemployment Assistance Board.

Hancock was transferred to the Home Office in 1938 and worked on civil defence financing. From 1941 to 1942, he was Secretary-General of the British Purchasing Commission and British Raw Material Commission in the United States. From 1942 to 1945, he was a deputy secretary at the Ministry of Supply, assisting with the administration of wartime production. He was appointed deputy secretary at the Ministry of National Insurance in 1945, working on the implementation of the post-war Labour government's social service reforms. He became the ministry's Permanent Secretary in 1949, serving until 1951. He was the Permanent Secretary at the Ministry of Food from 1951 to 1955, overseeing the end of rationing and food controls. He was then Chairman of the Board of Inland Revenue until he retired in 1958. He was then chair of the Local Government Commission for England and held directorships in the private sector. He died on 24 July 1965, while on business in Nigeria. Hancock had received several honours: he was appointed Companion of the Order of St Michael and St George (CMG) in 1942, Knight Commander of the Order of the British Empire (KBE) in 1947, Knight Commander of the Order of the Bath (KCB) in 1950 and Knight Grand Cross of the Order of the Bath (GCB) in 1962.

Government offices
Preceded by Sir Eric Bamford	Chairman, Board of Inland Revenue; 1955–1958	Succeeded by Sir Alexander Johnston
