= Alexander Johnston (civil servant) =

Scottish civil servant (1905–1994)

Sir Alexander Johnston, GCB, KBE (27 August 1905 – 7 September 1994) was a Scottish civil servant.

Born on 27 August 1905, Johnston was the sone of a stationery salesman. He attended George Heriot's School and the University of Edinburgh before entering the civil service in 1928 as an official in the Home Office, where he was an assistant principal in the criminal division early in his career.

As the Second World War approached, Johnston became involved in civil defence preparations. In 1943, he became principal assistant secretary at the Office of the Minister of Reconstruction, which involved working on the government's response to the Beveridge Report. From 1946 to 1948, he under-secretary in the Office of Lord President of the Council, and then deputy secretary to the Cabinet from 1948 to 1951. He then moved to HM Treasury as a third secretary, where he remained for seven years, before serving as chairman of the Board of Inland Revenue from 1958 to 1968; he authored The Inland Revenue in 1965. He was then deputy chairman of the Monopolies and Mergers Commission from 1969 to 1976 and of the Panel on Takeovers and Mergers from 1970 to 1983, and chairman of the University Academic Salaries Committee from 1970 to 1987. He wrote The City Take-Over Code in 1980.

Having been appointed a Companion of the Order of the Bath (CB) in the 1946 New Year Honours, Johnston was appointed a Knight Commander of the Order of the British Empire (KBE) in the 1953 Coronation Honours, and then promoted to Knight Grand Cross of the Order of the Bath (GCB) in the 1962 New Year Honours. He died on 7 September 1994.

Government offices
Preceded by Sir Henry Hancock	Chairman, Board of Inland Revenue; 1958–1968	Succeeded by Sir Arnold France
