= Godfrey Ince =

British civil servant

Sir Godfrey Herbert Ince KBE, GCB
- Born: 25 September 1891; Reigate, UK
- Died: 20 December 1960 (aged 69); Wimbledon, London, UK
- Education: London University
- Occupation: Civil servant
- Years active: 1919–1956

Sir Godfrey Herbert Ince GCB KBE (25 September 1891 – 20 December 1960) was a senior British civil servant. During World War II, he was Director-General of Manpower. After the war, he served in several different positions, including Chairman of Cable and Wireless and Permanent Secretary to the Ministry of Labour.

== Early life ==
Godfrey Herbert Ince was born at Reigate to G. A. R. Ince JP on 25 September 1891. His schooling took place at Reigate Grammar School and then London University.

=== Scholarship honours ===
He gained many honours in his education,

- 1912 – Sherbrooke University Mathematical Scholar
- 1913 – Mayer de Rothschild Scholar in Pure mathematics
- 1913 – Ellen Watson Memorial Scholar in Applied mathematics
- 1913 – Senior Mathematics Prizeman
- 1914 – Joseph Hume Scholar in Political economy
- 1914 – Senior Physics Prizeman, University College

=== University Sport ===
He was an organiser and captain of the first University of London football team. They were the first team to play at Moscow and then Prague. He also played cricket for University College.

=== First World War ===
Ince served with the Yorkshire Regiment, the East Lancashire Artillery and was attached to the Royal Engineers during the First World War.

Following injury in France, his mathematical skill was used in during his attachment where he carried out a field survey of the Royal Engineers.

== Government service ==
=== Ministry of Labour ===
Ince joined the Civil Service in 1919 in the Ministry of Labour where he was appointed an assistant principle. The following year he became Private Secretary to Sir David Shackleton, the Chief Labour Adviser. He then served several Ministers of Labour in this capacity, including the first female Cabinet Minister, Margaret Bondfield.

==== Unemployment Insurance ====
In 1933 Ince was made Assistant Secretary to the Ministry as well as Chief Insurance Officer under the Unemployment Insurance Act. This latter role saw him spend over a year in Australia and New Zealand to advise their Social insurances. This work culminated in his authoring a report on Unemployment Insurance in Australia. Following his return to the UK he was made Principal Assistant Secretary to the Ministry in 1938.

=== Second World War ===
Following the outbreak of the Second World War, Ince became Under-Secretary to the Ministry of Labour. In this position he had special responsibility for National service.

==== Production Executive Secretariat ====
Ince was seconded to the Production Executive Secretariat in 1941. He was acquainted with the chair of the secretariat, Ernest Bevin, with whom Ince had met while secretary to Lord Shaw's dock enquiry in 1920.

==== Director-General of Man Power ====
At the age of 49, Ince was appointed to the newly created post of Director-General of Man Power in June 1941. He had responsibility over the recruitment of service personnel as well as workers for factories.

== Post war and later life ==
Towards the end of the war in 1944 he was appointed to the post of Permanent Secretary to the Ministry of Labour, a position he held until 1956.

In 1956 he served as chairman of a committee appointed by the Postmaster-General looking into allegations of bias in news reporting on the Welsh language service of the BBC. The committee found no evidence to support the claim. However, they did find that there were, "...some errors of judgement and lack of balance in the news broadcast on the B.B.C. Welsh service and suggest the less reliance should be placed on information supplied by outside contributors".

Following his retirement Ince moved into business as chairman of Cable and Wireless.

He died on 20 December 1960 at hospital in the Wimbledon area of London.

== Personal life ==
Ince married his wife Iris in 1918 with whom he had three Daughters.

== Honours ==
For his service Ince a Companion of the Order of the Bath in 1941, a Knight Commander of the Order of the British Empire in 1943, and a Knight Grand Cross of the Order of the Bath in 1960.

== References and links ==
- BBC's WW2 archive
- The Old Reigatian Association
- National Portrait Gallery: Photographs of Sir Godfrey, taken by Rex Coleman

Government offices
Preceded by Sir Thomas Williams Phillips	Permanent Secretary of the Ministry of Labour and National Service; 1944–1956	Succeeded by Sir Harold Emmerson
