= Arnold France =

English civil servant

Sir Arnold William France, GCB (20 April 1911 – 2 January 1998) was an English civil servant.

Born on 20 April 1920, the son of a bank manager, France worked in the same bank as his father before serving in the Army during the Second World War. In 1943, he was made Deputy Economic and Financial Adviser to the Minister of State in the Middle East; in 1945, he entered HM Treasury, where he was appointed third secretary in 1960. In 1963, he moved to the Ministry of Health as deputy secretary, and was then its permanent secretary from 1964 to 1968, during which time the Ministry introduced a new charter of general practice which overhauled the system of payments made to doctors; he was closely involved in the negotiations with the medical profession this entailed. He was then chairman of the Board of Inland Revenue from 1968 to 1972; while principally concerned with departmental management, he also oversaw the opening of the Inland Revenue's first computer centre. In the 1970s he was a director of The Rank Organisation.

France was appointed a Companion of the Order of the Bath (CB) in the 1957 Birthday Honours, and was promoted to Knight Commander (KCB) in the 1965 Birthday Honours and Knight Grand Cross (GCB) in the 1972 Birthday Honours. He died on 2 January 1998.

Government offices
Preceded by Sir Bruce Fraser	Permanent Secretary, Ministry for Health; 1964–1968	Succeeded by Sir Clifford Jarrett (As Permanent Secretary, Department of Health and Social Security)
Preceded by Sir Alexander Johnston	Chairman, Board of Inland Revenue; 1968–1972	Succeeded by Sir Norman Price
