= The Chameleon (magazine) =

1894 magazine

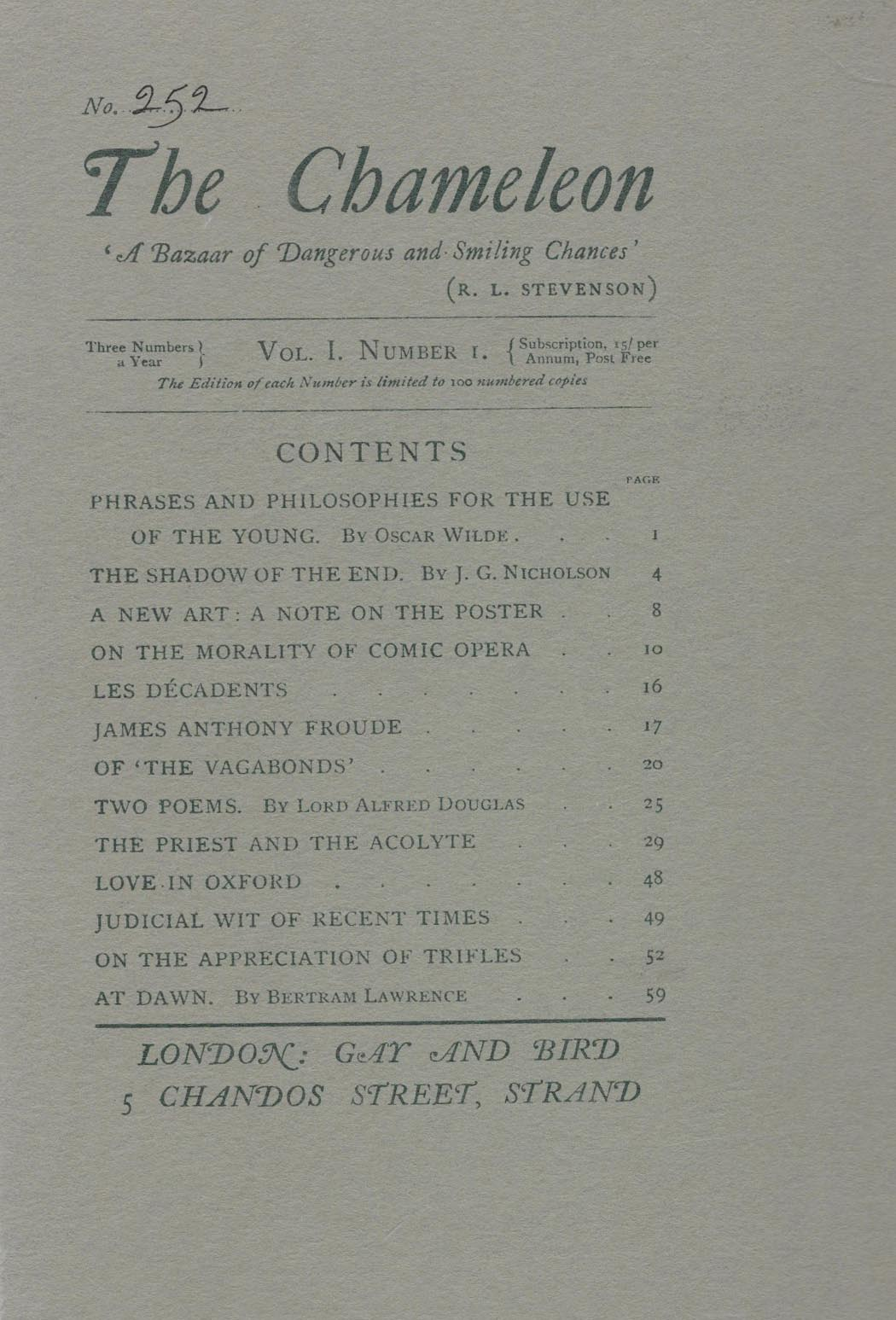
- The table of contents of the first and only issue of The Chameleon.
- Editor: John Francis Bloxam
- Format: quarto (10.25 x 7.75")
- Publisher: Gay and Bird
- First issue: 1894
- Final issue: 1894

The Chameleon was a literary magazine edited by Oxford undergraduate John Francis Bloxam. Its first and only issue was published in December 1894. It featured several literary works from the Uranian tradition, concerning the love of adolescent boys.

The magazine gained notoriety when it was invoked repeatedly in the 1895 trials of Oscar Wilde in an effort by association to impute to Wilde deviant tendencies. as Wilde had contributed "Phrases and Philosophies for the Use of the Young" to the magazine, a set of humorous aphorisms. While the content of "Phrases" was fairly benign, Wilde faced cross-examination about some of the other, more controversial works that appeared in the magazine, particularly the story "The Priest and the Acolyte", which was falsely rumoured to have been written by Wilde.

The magazine's subtitle, A Bazaar of Dangerous and Smiling Chances, is a quote from writer Robert Louis Stevenson.

== Publication history ==
The Chameleon was conceived by John Bloxam, an undergraduate at Oxford University. It was originally to be titled The Parrot Tulip, but the name The Chameleon was chosen by George Ives in a meeting between Ives, Bloxam, and Oscar Wilde in London. Bloxam showed his story "The Priest and the Acolyte" to Wilde and Ives. Wilde encouraged him to publish it, while Ives urged caution. Bloxam published no further writing after The Chameleon, and would go on to be ordained as a priest in 1897, spending the remainder of his life in the clergy.

The magazine was intended to have been published three times per year at a price of 15 shillings, but it ceased publication after the first issue. Within a week of the publication of the debut issue, Jerome K. Jerome wrote a harsh rebuke in his journal To-Day, writing that the magazine was "an advocate for indulgence in the cravings of an unnatural disease".

== Contents ==
Of the thirteen contributions included in the sole issue of The Chameleon, nine were anonymous. One of these, "The Priest and the Acolyte", is now known to be the work of editor John Bloxam, though following its publication it was widely attributed to Oscar Wilde, including by Wilde's legal opponent, the Marquess of Queensberry.

Though best known for its Uranian content, the magazine was not exclusively devoted to homosexual themes. For example, it included a tribute to the recently deceased James Anthony Froude and a humorous essay "On the Appreciation of Trifles".

Wilde's "Phrases and Philosophies for the Use of the Young" is a set of witty aphorisms such as "One should either be a work of art, or wear a work of art.", and "One should always be a little improbable." A few have been read as having a sexual message, including "Wickedness is a myth invented by good people to account for the curious attractiveness of others." and "If the poor only had profiles there would be no difficulty in solving the problem of poverty.", which scholar Neil McKenna glosses as "a clear reference to prostitution".

Lord Alfred Douglas, Wilde's lover, contributed two poems with Uranian themes: "In Praise of Shame" and "Two Loves". "Two Loves" contrasts heterosexual and homosexual love (referring to the latter by the now-famous phrase "the love that dare not speak its name").

"The Shadow of the End" by John Gambril Nicholson is a sombre piece of prose poetry about the death of a young male lover.

The most scandalous inclusion was the short story "The Priest and the Acolyte". The story concerns a love affair between a twenty-eight-year-old priest and a fourteen-year-old boy. When their love is discovered, the priest commits murder–suicide using poisoned wine. The story was considered shocking as it unambiguously depicted the relationship between the priest and boy as sexual, and moreover presented the boy as a willing partner in the relationship, rather than the victim of coercion or seduction.

== Use in Wilde trials ==
The Chameleon was repeatedly invoked in the 1895 trials of Oscar Wilde, beginning with his libel suit against the Marquess of Queensberry. Though Wilde was ultimately convicted of gross indecency in the criminal trial which followed, his involvement with The Chameleon was not a decisive factor, and he was able to effectively conceal his involvement in the publication's planning and his approval of the controversial story "The Priest and the Acolyte".

A "Plea of Justification" filed by Queensberry before the libel trial, in addition to accusing Wilde of acts of sodomy with multiple named boys, referred to Wilde's novel The Picture of Dorian Gray and The Chameleon as both relating to "the practices and passions of persons of sodomitical and unnatural habits and tastes". Moreover, Queensberry accused Wilde of being involved in the publication of The Chameleon. During cross-examination, Queensberry's counsel, Edward Carson, asked Wilde about Alfred Douglas's poem "Two Loves" and Bloxam's story "The Priest and the Acolyte". Wilde denied that the former made any "improper suggestion", and protested that, contrary to Carson's claim, he had had no role in the inclusion of the latter, and did not approve of it. Wilde's attorney, Edward Clarke, claimed that Wilde was in fact so offended by "The Priest and the Acolyte" that, upon reading it, he wrote to the editor to demand that the magazine be withdrawn from publication.

In the criminal trial against Wilde for sodomy and gross indecency which followed the libel suit, prosecutor Charles Gill again asked Wilde about "Two Loves", famously asking Wilde about the poem's use of the phrase "the love that dare not speak its name", prompting Wilde to reply:

Wilde: "The love that dare not speak its name" in this century is such a great affection of an elder for a younger man as there was between David and Jonathan, such as Plato made the very basis of his philosophy, and such as you find in the sonnets of Michelangelo and Shakespeare. It is that deep spiritual affection that is as pure as it is perfect. It dictates and pervades great works of art, like those of Shakespeare and Michelangelo, and those two letters of mine, such as they are. It is in this century misunderstood, so much misunderstood that it may be described as "the love that dare not speak its name", and on that account of it I am placed where I am now. It is beautiful, it is fine, it is the noblest form of affection. There is nothing unnatural about it. It is intellectual, and it repeatedly exists between an older and a younger man, when the older man has intellect, and the younger man has all the joy, hope and glamour of life before him. That it should be so, the world does not understand. The world mocks at it, and sometimes puts one in the pillory for it.

== Related publications ==
The Chameleon has been compared to The Spirit Lamp (1892–3), an earlier Oxford undergraduate journal edited by Lord Alfred Douglas, which also carried homoerotic themes. The Artist and Journal of Home Culture was another contemporaneous publication known for including work by the Uranians.
