= William George Paulson Townsend =

English artist, educator, designer, writer and editor (1868–1941)

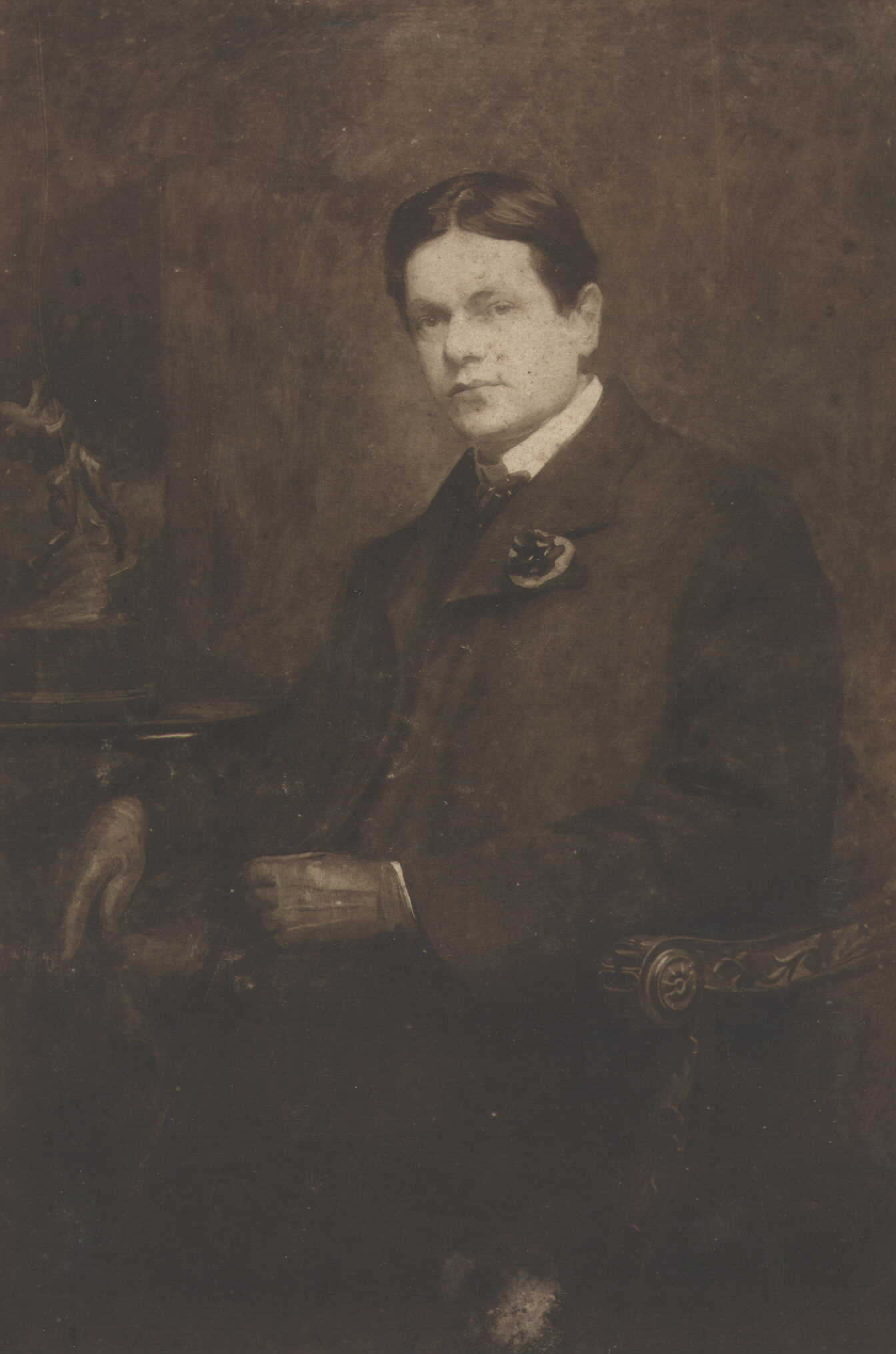
- Townsend in 1905
- Born: 1868; Derby, England
- Died: 12 June 1941 (aged 72–73); Sunningdale, England
- Resting place: Twickenham Cemetery, London, England
- Occupations: artist, writer, designer, educato, editor
- Spouse: Jessie Beatrice Atkins Jones
- Children: Philip, Geoffrey
- Relatives: Ernest Townsend (brother)
- Writing career
- Literary movement: Arts and Crafts

William George Paulson Townsend (1868–1941) was an English artist, designer, writer and editor.

== Early life ==
Born in Derby in 1868, Townsend's father was a third generation coachbuilder and designer. His younger brother, Ernest Townsend rose to prominence as an artist.

== Career and works ==
William pursued a career as an art teacher, becoming teacher of drawing, government examiner of art and master of design at the Royal School of Needlework. Some of his wallpaper designs and some watercolour copies of Botticelli works survive in the collection at the Victoria and Albert Museum. He wrote and published widely on the decorative arts and particularly encouraged the study of design through examination of museum exhibits.

== The Art Workers' Quarterly ==
Apart from books and journal articles, Townsend produced and edited The Art Workers' Quarterly, a serial published quarterly by Chapman and Hall. The title was established in 1902 "to supply designs in a readily applicable form to those who do not invent, plan, or adapt ornament, and who find difficulty in obtaining good and suitable suggestions for their work".

Articles covered the work and activities of the art and craft schools, organisations, guilds and societies of the time, exhibition reviews and analytical pieces as well as illustrated articles on art and craft techniques.

Not only did Townsend contribute to the publication, he was successful in garnering contributions from several notable writers on the Arts and Crafts movement including Walter Crane, Alexander Fisher, A. Romney Green, James Guthrie, J. Illingworth Kay, May Morris, Bernard Rackham, Silvester Sparrow, Alfred Stevens and Lawrence Weaver. Articles included reviews of the works of Charles Robert Ashbee, Sidney Barnsley, Walter Crane, Bernard Cuzner, Alexander Fisher, Arthur Gaskin, Ernest Gimson, Ambrose Heal Jr., Ernestine Mills, May Morris, Charles Spooner, Heywood Sumner, Mary Seton Fraser Tytler (Mrs G. F. Watts), C.F.A. Voysey and Paul Woodroffe.

The associated publication company that Townsend established with Arthur F. Wallis was wound up in 1905. The title appeared quarterly until 1906 and with two further editions in August and December 1908.

== Family ==
His father, James Townsend was a coach builder in Derby, his brother Ernest Townsend was an artist, within the family he was known as "Darby". He married Jessie Beatrice Jones in 1898 and they lived most of their lives in Twickenham. They had two sons, Philip (1899 – 1959) and Geoffrey (1911 – 2002). Geoffrey became notable as an architect and property developer, co-founding Span Developments with architect Eric Lyons.

William George Paulson Townsend died in 1941 in Sunningdale, aged 73, survived by his wife and sons.

== Selected publications ==
- Townsend, William George Paulson (1899). Measured drawings of French furniture: from the collection in South Kensington Museum. New York: Truslove, Hanson & Comba.
- Townsend, William George Paulson; Pesel, Louisa F. (1899). Embroidery, or, The craft of the needle (1 ed.). London: Truslove and Hanson.
- Townsend, William George Paulson (1901). Plant and floral studies for designers, art students, and craftsmen. London, New York: Truslove, Hanson & Comba. (Reprinted 2005 by Dover Art Instruction and again in 2012 ISBN 9780486148670).
- Paulson-Townsend, W. G. (November 1914). "British Industrial Art". Journal of the Imperial Arts League.
- Butterfield, Lindsay P. (1922). Floral Forms in Wallpaper Design. Preface and descriptive notes by W.G.P. Townsend.
- Townsend, William George Paulson (1922). Modern decorative art in England, its development and characteristics. Vol. 1: woven and printed fabrics, wall–papers, lace and embroidery. London: B. T. Batsford.
- Butterfield, Lindsay P. (1922). Floral forms in historic design: mainly from objects in the Victoria & Albert Museum but including examples from designs by William Morris and C. F. A. Voysey. London: B. T. Batsford. Preface and descriptive notes by W.G.P. Townsend.
