= Charles Kains Jackson =

English poet

- Born: Charles Philip Castle Kains Jackson; 1857
- Died: 1933 (aged 75–76)
- Occupations: Poet; lawyer; editor
- Writing career
- Notable works: Finibus Cantat Amor; Lysis
- Literary movement: Uranian school

Charles Philip Castle Kains Jackson (1857–1933) was an English poet closely associated with the Uranian school.

== Biography ==
Beginning in 1888, in addition to a career as a lawyer, he served as editor for the periodical The Artist and Journal of Home Culture, which became something of an official periodical for the movement. In it, he praised such artists as Henry Scott Tuke (to whom he dedicated a homo-erotic sonnet entitled "Sonnet on a picture by Tuke") and Henry Oliver Walker. He also befriended such similar-minded contemporaries as Frederick William Rolfe, Lord Alfred Douglas and John Addington Symonds.

The homosexual and pederastic aspects of The Artist and Journal of Home Culture declined after the replacement of Kains Jackson as an editor in 1894. The final issue edited by Kains Jackson included his essay, the New Chivalry, an argument for the moral and societal benefits of pederasty and erotic male friendship on the grounds of both Platonism and Social Darwinism. According to Kains Jackson, the New Chivalry would promote "the youthful masculine ideal" over the Old Chivalry's emphasis on the feminine. Jackson's volumes of poetry include Finibus Cantat Amor (1922) and Lysis (1924).

Kains Jackson was a member of the Order of Chaeronea, a secret society for homosexuals founded in 1897 by George Ives, which was named after the location of the battle where the Sacred Band of Thebes was finally annihilated in 338 BC. Other members included Samuel Elsworth Cottam, Montague Summers, and John Gambril Nicholson.

Jackson discovered the poetry of Edward Cracroft Lefroy. He published two small books of poetry, both concerning his romance with his cousin Cecil Castle who died in 1922. A third unpublished collection of 85 poems, titled Alba Ligustra, dating from 1925–28, was sold by an American book dealer in 2017. Many of the poems concerned Kains-Jackson's memories of Castle, and other poems and notes referred to Henry Scott Tuke.
