= Francis Edwin Murray =

British poet

Francis Edwin Murray (1854-1932) was a Uranian poet and publisher of the late 19th and early 20th century. Almost totally forgotten today, his books of verse include Rondeaux of Boyhood (1923), limited to 300 copies, and From a Lover's Garden: More Rondeaux and Other Verses of Boyhood (1924), limited to 225 copies. The former was written under the pseudonym A. Newman. The latter contained an introduction by fellow Uranian John Gambril Nicholson. Murray also wrote a bibliography of Austin Dobson, published in 1900. Murray worked as a printer, bookseller and publisher in Brompton Road, London. He printed the works of other Uranians, including John Leslie Barford. Bruce Robinson has acknowledged Rondeaux of Boyhood as source material for the dialogue of Uncle Monty in Withnail and I.
