= John Bloxam =

John Bloxam may refer to:

- John Francis Bloxam (1807–1891), English academic and clergyman
- John Rouse Bloxam (1873–1928), English author and churchman
