= Cuthbert Wright =

American literary critic, writer, poet, and educator

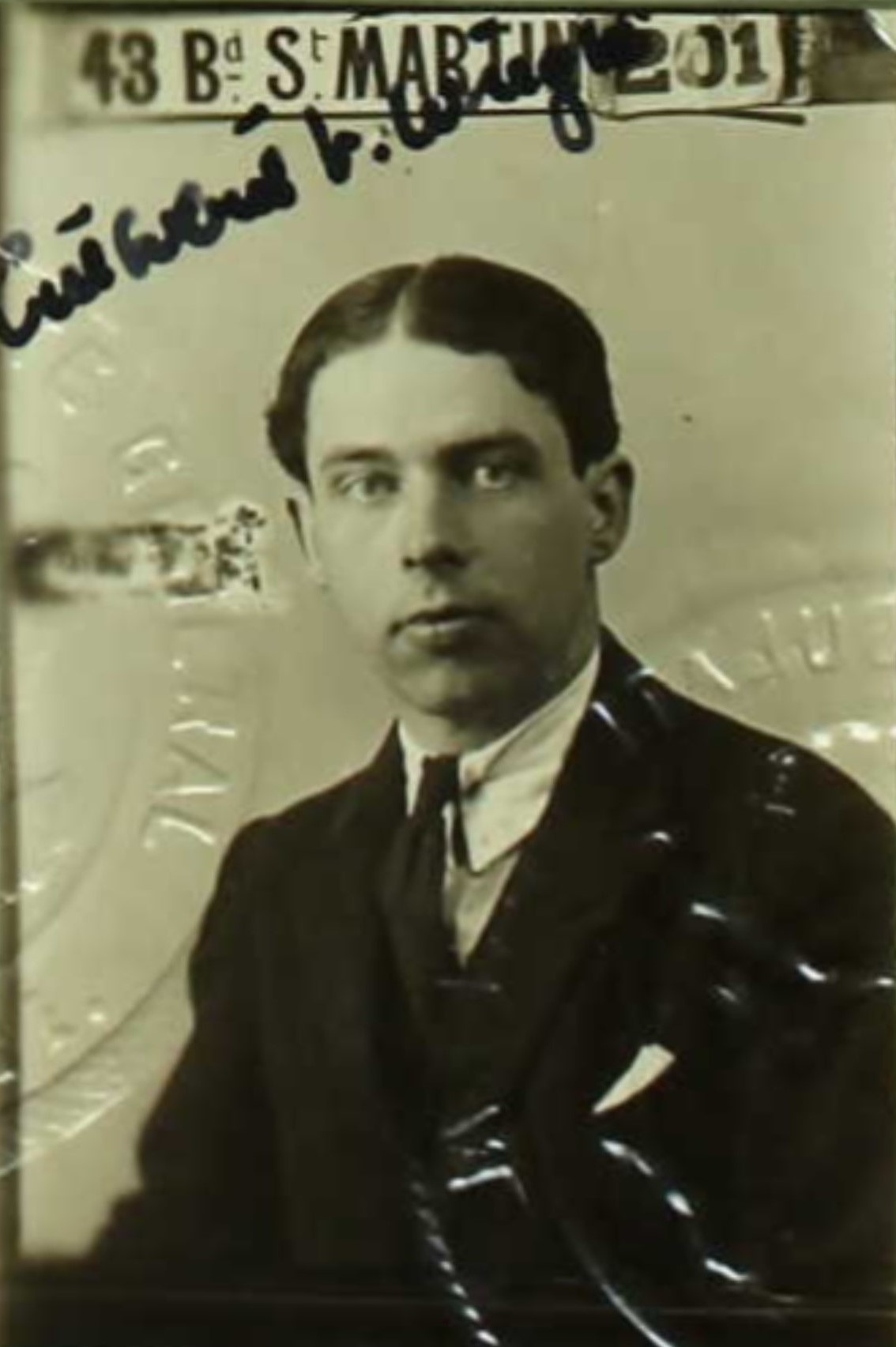
- Cuthbert Wright aged about 28
- Born: Cuthbert Vail Wright; March 20, 1892; Elmira, New York, United States
- Died: November 28, 1948 (aged 55); Worcester, Massachusetts, United States
- Occupations: literary critic, writer, poet, educator

Cuthbert Vail Wright (March 20, 1892 (Note: The New York State Birth Index gives as date of birth March 20, 1892. The 1900 and 1910 federal censuses and the 1905 New Jersey state census also declare for a birth in (March) 1892, but the 1940 federal census gives his age as 41. A number of passport applications give his date of birth as March 20, 1893. Several obituaries state his age at death as 49, suggesting a year of birth of about 1899. The headstone application for military veterans submitted for Wright has the year of birth 1899, crossed out and amended to 1893. The headstone itself reads: "CUTHBERT V WRIGHT / MASSACHUSETTS / PFC / US ARMY / WORLD WAR 1 / MARCH 20 1899 / NOVEMBER 28 1948". The year of birth 1899 – and/or the resultant notion that Wright's debut volume of poetry was published when he was an adolescent – is followed by Kaylor (2010b), who states that Wright wrote One Way of Love (1915) "at the age of sixteen", by Dynes (2016), who speaks of "the highly precocious Cuthbert Wright", and by Ogrinc (2017), who says the volume was "published when he was a teenager.") – November 28, 1948) was an American literary critic, writer, poet, and educator.

== Education, military service, and teaching ==
Cuthbert Wright was born in Elmira, New York, to Ella Vail Wright and William Edgar Wright, an Episcopal rector. He went to college from 1910 to 1913 and 1916–1917, attending Kent School in Connecticut. From 1917 to 1919 he served in the army, being sent to France in 1918 where he saw action as a private first class. Over the years he travelled back and forth between the United States and France, from where he applied for leave to travel to various countries in Europe and the Middle East.

After leaving France in 1922 he became a teacher in Kent, Connecticut. He received a Bachelor's degree from Harvard, a certificate of merit from the University of Paris in 1930, a Master of Arts from the University of the South in Tennessee, and a Master of Arts, magna cum laude, from Laval University in Quebec in 1946. In the final eleven years of his life, Wright was head of the Department of English and Comparative Literature at Assumption College in Worcester, Massachusetts.

== Literary activities ==
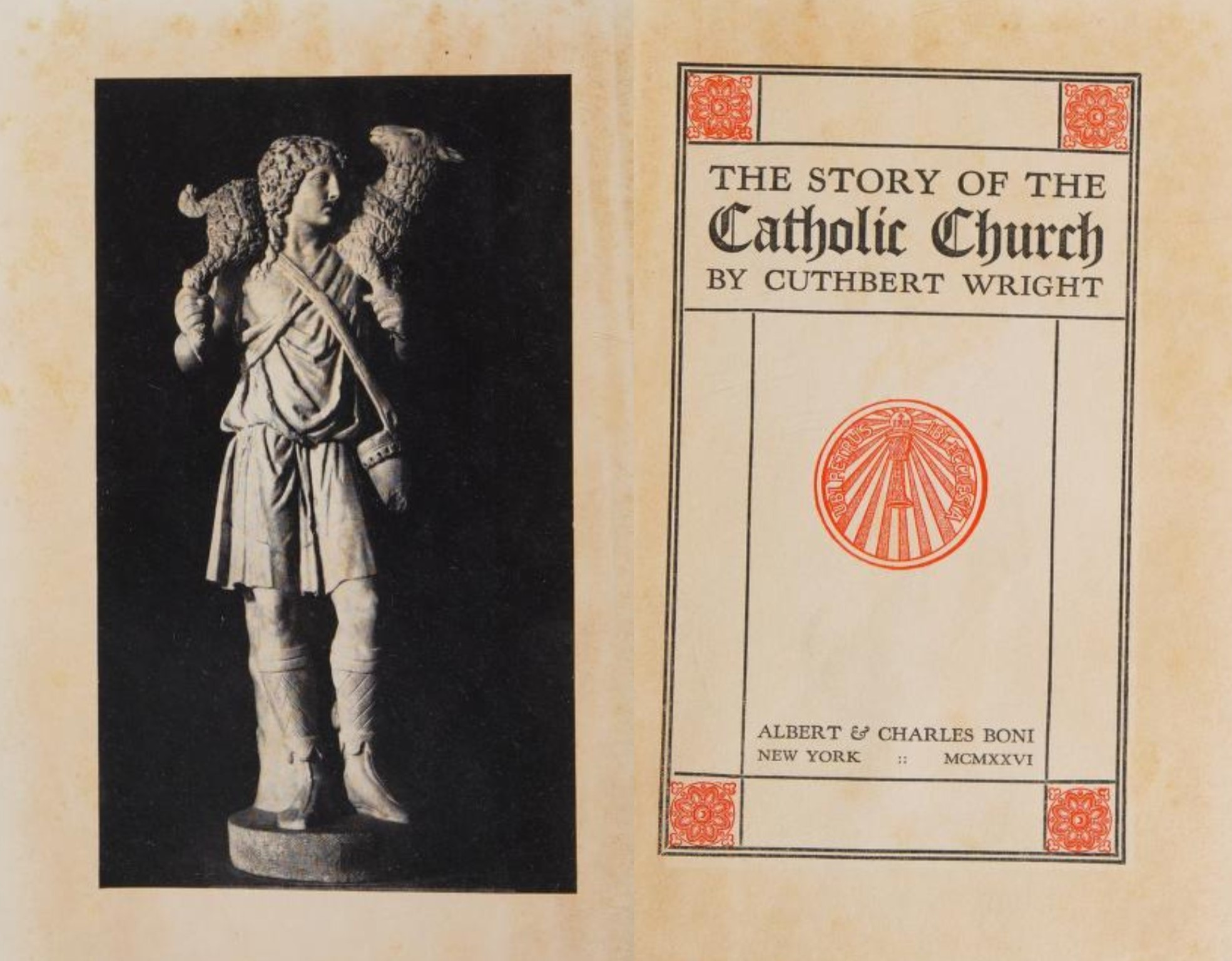
'The Story of the Catholic Church' by Cuthbert Wright (New York: Albert & Charles Boni, 1926)

In 1915 Wright published a book of poems, One Way of Love (London: Elkin Mathews), which was "strikingly Uranian" in nature. Expressing – like the work of John Francis Bloxam and Montague Summers – a fascination with the beauty and majesty of high church rituals, Wright's poems conjure up "gorgeous (one of his favourite adjectives) ceremonies and splendid, transcendent rituals, full of incense and gold". The choristers in his poems "are pagan demons in a Christian setting, 'childish Galahads in passionate red, / Each with his weight of crushing, golden hair'". Kaylor (2010a) considers Wright to have been "well-versed in the Uranian material being written in England and [to have] sought to influence that English Uranian audience." The Scotsman reviewed the volume as being "Calm, austere, and contemplative in feeling" as well as "always elevated in thought, and both smooth and scholarly, if sometimes disappointingly cold, in expression".

Over twenty-five years, starting in the early 1920s, Wright contributed many reviews to The New York Times Book Review, and throughout the 1930s and 1940s he wrote for the Catholic journal Commonweal. Book reviews by Wright also appeared in magazines such as The Freeman and The Dial. His historical study The Story of the Catholic Church was published in 1926 (New York: Albert & Charles Boni).

A portrait of Wright by Rafael Sabatini was reproduced in vol. III, no. 2 (August 1922) of Gargoyle, an English-language little magazine published in Paris. The same issue contains a short story by Wright, 'Ganymede', about his encounter with a youth urinating on the flower beds of the Luxembourg Gardens, who "turns out to be Ganymede – the most unobtainable and most desirable of all boys". Wright frequently contributed prose to Gargoyle.

Cuthbert Wright died in Worcester and was buried in Saint Anne Cemetery in Sturbridge, Massachusetts.
