= Stuart Young (disambiguation) =

Stuart Young (born 1975) is a Trinidadian and Tobagonian politician who served as prime minister from March to May 2025.

Stuart Young may also refer to:

- John Moray Stuart-Young (1881–1939), British poet
- Stuart Young (accountant) (1934–1986), British accountant, chairman of the BBC board of governors
- Stuart Young (cricketer) (born 1938), English cricketer
- Stuart Young (footballer) (born 1972), English footballer

== See also ==
- Stuart Young-Black (born 1959), Canadian equestrian
- Robert Young Stuart (1883–1933), Chief of the United States Forest Service
