= Society of Anubis =

Semi-secret homophile society in United States

- Formation: 1967; 59 years ago
- Headquarters: Los Angeles
- Members: ≈ 1,000 (1970)

The Society of Anubis was a lesbian and gay organization in the Los Angeles area. Founded in 1967 as a semi-secret homophile society, it developed into a more political organization in the following years and had the first float in Los Angeles' first pride parade in 1970.

== Establishment ==
The Society of Anubis was founded in 1967 as a semi-secret homophile society in Los Angeles. Its initial stated purpose was "to present to the public a true picture of the homosexual as a worthwhile member of society", a relatively conservative mission when compared to those of other lesbian and gay organizations being established in Los Angeles at the time. It was named for the Egyptian god Anubis, associated with healing and with the balancing of scales.

The society received a charter from the state of California in 1969, by which time it was somewhat bolder as an organization. Its president Helen Niehaus stated that "the specific purpose for which we are chartered" made the newfound nonprofit status more significant – the organization had clearly stated on its application that a key goal of the Society of Anubis would be "to support legislation for the enactment of just and enlightened sex laws".

The society was relatively large for its time, with approximately 800 members around the time of its establishment and approximately 1,000 members by 1970. It had both gay and lesbian members in roughly equal proportion.

== Activity ==
The Society of Anubis maintained a ten-acre ranch in the San Gabriel Valley in California, as well as a club. While conservative in character, focusing largely on social and community programs, the society was influenced by the radical character of gay and lesbian organizing at the time.

In 1969, when two undercover agents infiltrated the society and staged a raid by the Vice Squad at a member's birthday party, Helen Niehaus used her body to block officers' cameras, and was threatened with arrest. While no arrests were made, the society was cited for selling alcohol and allowing dancing without a license. The Society of Anubis became more explicitly political as a result of these events, and its membership was encouraged to vote with their gay and lesbian status in mind.

The year 1970 brought an increase in the public activity of the Society of Anubis. On the evening of January 11, 1970, members of the society took part in a demonstration in Los Angeles for gay rights. The stated purpose of the march was "to protest the laws against homosexual acts by adults and to urge the California Supreme Court to grant hearings on the constitutionality of the laws which make said acts a felony." A crowd of about 300 people marched along Hollywood Boulevard carrying signs, flags, and banners. The society also participated in the first pride parade in Los Angeles, held in response to the one in New York City commemorating the Stonewall riots of the previous year. As recalled by Morris Kight, their float was a representation of the ancient Egyptian god Anubis riding on a white horse. The floats were in rough alphabetical order, but the Society of Anubis was at the front with The Advocate float following behind.

On April 5, 1970, Helen Niehaus performed "outlaw marriages" of homosexual couples at a "Gay-In" protest event in Los Angeles.

== See also ==
- Order of Chaeronea
- Mattachine Society

== Bibliography ==
- Faderman, Lillian; Timmons, Stuart (2009). "Rumblings of a Gay Revolution". Gay L.A.: A History of Sexual Outlaws, Power Politics, and Lipstick Lesbians. Berkeley: University of California Press. pp. 152–153. ISBN 978-0-520-26061-0.
