= Geoffrey Paulson Townsend =

English architect and developer

- Born: 11 May 1911; Twickenham, Middlesex, England
- Died: 1 August 2002 (aged 91); Worthing, West Sussex, England
- Education: Regent Street Polytechnic
- Occupation: Architect
- Spouse: Winifred Walbanck
- Children: one daughter
- Practice: Modern Homes

Geoffrey Paulson Townsend (11 May 1911 – 1 August 2002) was an English architect and developer, noted for his company, Span Developments, and long association with architect, Eric Lyons.

== Early life and family ==
Geoffrey Paulson Townsend was born in Twickenham, Middlesex in 1911 to an artistic family. His mother, Jessie Beatrice née Jones, was an art-teacher and his father, William George Paulson Townsend, a writer and designer, was master of design at the Royal School of Needlework. His uncle, Ernest Townsend, trained as an architect but pursued a career in art.

== Early career ==
Geoffrey Townsend left school aged 16, working initially as a joiner.

By 1931 Townsend was designing small terraced houses in Whitton and Twickenham. He worked as a draughtsman for Robert Lutyens, son of Edwin Lutyens and trained as an architect by attending evening-classes at the Regent Street Polytechnic which was where he first met Eric Lyons. In 1937 Townsend formed his own architectural practice, Modern Homes, in Richmond, London and Lyons worked there, the pair designing small housing schemes until the outbreak of war. During the war, in 1944, he married Winifred Walbanck (1914–1992).

== Post-war architect ==
Townsend and Lyons restarted their partnership after the war working mostly on war-damage restoration and house alterations. In 1948 they completed Oaklands, a small housing development of four, two-storey, six-apartment blocks set in landscaped grounds in Whitton that was the prototype of their future success.

== Span Developments ==
In 1953, frustrated with a lack of support from developers and funders for their ideas for modern economic housing, Townsend established Bargood Estates, a development company of his own in conjunction with Henry Cushman, an agent for the Alliance Building Society. Bargood Estates went on to build 12 townhouses at North Walls and Chapel Street, Chichester which incorporated Span features such as openness, light and community with a Residents' Association, 1963.

Townsend resigned from RIBA due to their conflict of interest rules of the time. Although the partnership with Lyons was legally ended, they continued to share the same business premises, the studio offices at Lyons' home, Mill House, East Molesey, maintaining their close collaboration.

Townsend and Cushman, acquired land near Ham Common, Ham, London. Working with Lyons as consultant architect they developed Parkleys; 169 flats across fifteen two and three-storey H-plan blocks and a block of six shops and maisonettes. As the project progressed, Townsend and Cushman were joined by Leslie Bilsby, another former Regent Street Polytechnic student, to form Priory Hall Ltd.. In 1957, Bilsby gave up his other business interests and, together, the group formed Span Developments. Townsend was particularly conscious of the need to organise maintenance of the estate following sale. He promoted the concept of a legally constituted Residents' Association, membership of which would be a condition of sale, and which would include covenants that would place mutual obligations on the residents.

Span developed 73 schemes comprising 2134 dwellings up to the end of the 1960s. The ambitious New Ash Green project, an entire village, hit substantial financial difficulties, causing Lyons to withdraw and Bilsby and Townsend to resign. Townsend worked independently as a developer for several years thereafter. Bilsby and Townsend reunited in the late 1970s and formed SPAN Environments Ltd working once more with Lyons and Cunningham as consultant architects and Gostling, the builder from New Ash Green, doing the construction. Together they constructed four further developments in Blackheath and New Mallard Place in Teddington. The latter was conceived before Lyons' death in 1980 and completed in 1984, by which time Townsend was in his early 70s.

== Death and legacy ==
Geoffrey Paulson Townsend died in Worthing, West Sussex in August 2002, aged 91. Townsend's focus on the post-sale social and administrative cohesion of the estates SPAN built is credited with the long-term preservation and maintenance of Span's projects.
