= John Moray Stuart-Young =

British writer

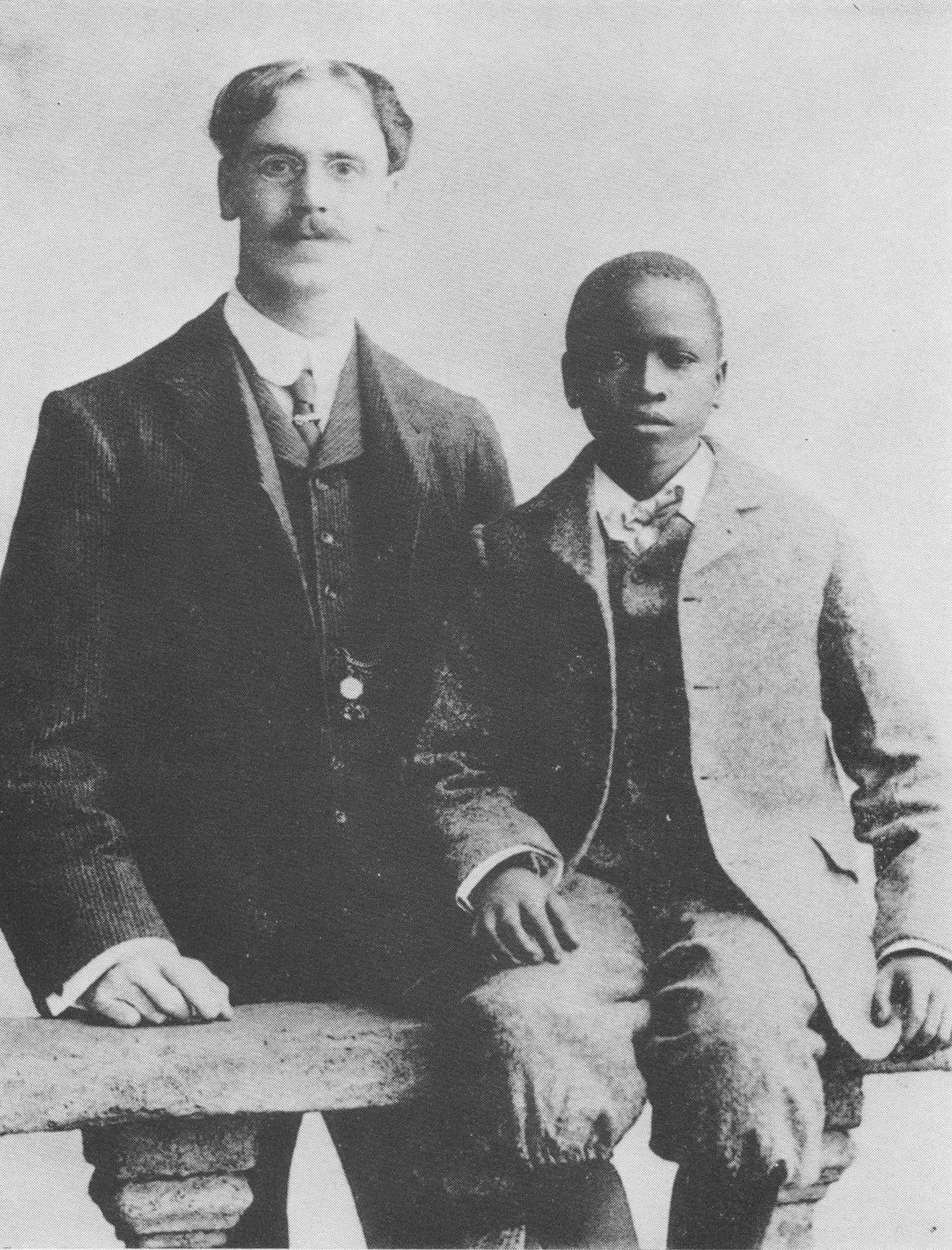
Stuart-Young and Ibrahim the Unkissed

John Moray Stuart-Young (1881–1939) was an English Uranian poet, memoirist, novelist and merchant trader. Stuart-Young published numerous works, including books of poetry, novels, descriptions of African life and autobiographical works. His poems are closely linked to fin-de-siècle and Uranian themes, being informed by decadence, colonialism, and pederasty.

Stuart-Young's 1905 memoirs focused on his supposed romantic relationship with Oscar Wilde during his adolescence. Stuart-Young presented forged letters by Wilde to support his claim. Wilde's biographers doubt that Stuart-Young ever met Wilde.

== Life and career ==
Born John James Young in the slums of Manchester, Stuart-Young was poorly educated and treated badly by those around him. Beaten by his labourer father, his mother was forced to take in washing. All of his siblings died young of tuberculosis. Stuart-Young left school at 13, working for little reward as an office boy and clerk. After having been caught stealing money from a gas-mantle works, apparently to help establish himself as something of a literary gentleman, Stuart-Young was arrested and spent six months in prison. He was only 18.

He later spent many years in Africa, in such diverse places as Sierra Leone, Grand Bassa in Liberia, Conakry in French Guinea and later, Onitsha on the Niger River. In Onitsha, he worked as a trader to some measure of success. He would exchange European goods for African materials such as palm-oil, ivory and rubber. Stuart-Young was a strong critic of the work of missionaries. According to Stuart-Young, it was a photograph by Frederick Rolfe of a nude Egyptian boy that awoke in him, a schoolboy of fourteen, a fascination for Africa.

He once alleged to have had a relationship, with romantic overtones, with Oscar Wilde. Stuart-Young claimed to have first met Wilde in June 1894 as a teen, while dining at the Savoy. The two visited the Haymarket, he said, to see Wilde's Lady Windermere's Fan. Stuart-Young even forged letters allegedly by Wilde to substantiate this. Stuart-Young's memoirs of Wilde and the supposed letters were published in his 1905 volume, Osrac, the Self-Sufficient. According to Timothy D'Arch Smith, it is unlikely Stuart-Young had ever met Wilde. D'Arch Smith further states that the love of Stuart-Young's life was an Englishman named Tommy Todd. Stuart-Young developed close relationships with several young African houseboys, including a mix-raced, 14-year-old boy named Ibrahim, referred to by Stuart-Young as 'the Unkissed', and an 11-year-old named Bosa, who he later took with him to England.

Stuart-Young married twice, both times to English women: Annie Knight in 1908 and Nellie Gibson Etheridge Young in 1919. There is no evidence of a marriage to an African woman, in spite of his 1904 novel about such a union, Merely a Negress: a West African Story.

He was given the honorary name of Odeziaku by the Igbo people, which means "keeper, caretaker, manager, or arranger of wealth". In 1939, Stuart-Young died in Port Harcourt, Nigeria. He was given a lavish funeral by his friends and employees in Africa, where 10,000 Igbo mourners lined the streets for ceremonies which extended over four days.

=== Writings ===
Stuart-Young published dozens of works, including books of poetry, novels, descriptions of African life and autobiographical works. His poems are closely linked to fin-de-siècle and Uranian themes, being informed by decadence, colonialism and pederasty.

=== Legacy ===
A book-length study of Stuart-Young, entitled the Forger's Tale: the Search for Odeziaku, was published by Stephanie Newell in 2006.

== Bibliography ==
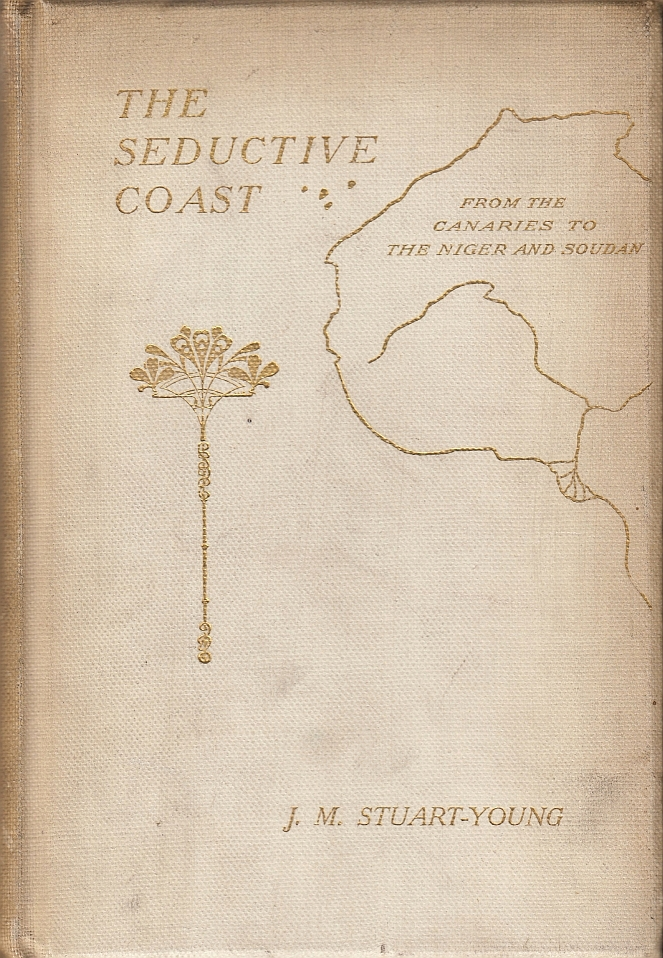
The Seductive Coast (1909)

- Faery Gold, a Poem, and Prose Allegories (1904)
- Minor Melodies (1904)
- Merely a Negress (1904)
- Osrac, the Self-Sufficient (1905)
- The After-Life (1905)
- An Urning's Love (Being a Study of Poetic Morbidity) (1905)
- Passion's Peril (1906)
- Through Veiled Eyes (1908)
- The Antinomian (1909)
- A Cupful of Kernels (1909)
- Out of Hours (1909)
- The Coaster at Home (1916)
- Candles in Sunshine (1919)
- The Soul Slayer (1920)
- Minor Melodies (1921)
- Chits from West Africa (1923)
- Who Buys My Dreams? (1923)
- Johnny Jones, Guttersnipe (1926)
- What Does It Matter? (1927)
- The Immortal Nine: an Introduction to the Poetry of the Last Century (1928)
- The Fallen Angel! (1932)
- Dreaming True (1934)
