= New Ash Green =

Village in Kent, England

Coordinates: 51°22′N 0°18′E

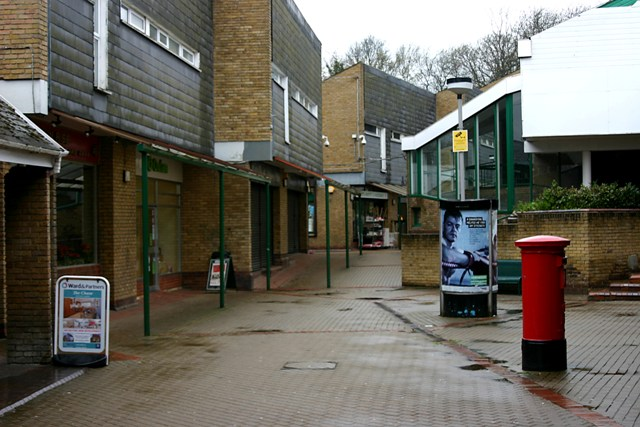
- The Row, New Ash Green's shopping area, in 2012

- Location within Kent
- Civil parish: Ash-cum-Ridley
- District: Sevenoaks
- Shire county: Kent
- Region: South East
- Country: England
- Sovereign state: United Kingdom
- Post town: LONGFIELD
- Postcode district: DA3
- Police: Kent
- Fire: Kent
- Ambulance: South East Coast
- UK Parliament: Tonbridge
- Website: Ash-cum-Ridley Parish Council

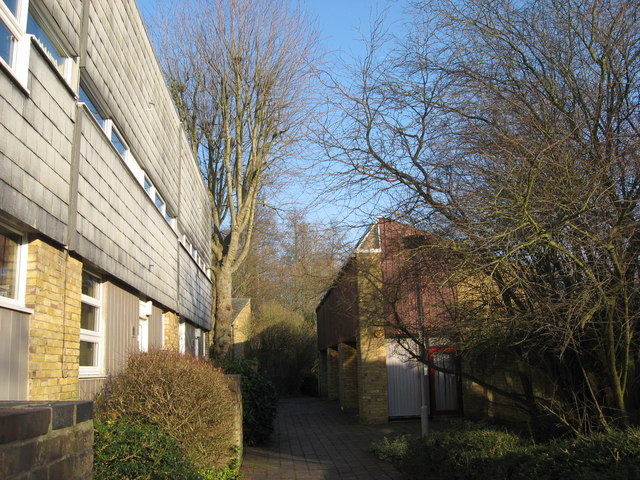
The original Span-built properties in New Ash Green, with the earliest houses on the left and the original Span office and shop on the right

New Ash Green is a village in the Sevenoaks District of Kent, England. It is located 8 miles south west of Gravesend.

== History ==
Building of the village began in 1967, with Span as the developer and Eric Lyons as the designer. The architectural design of New Ash Green was innovative for its time, and its original concept was intended as a prototype for a new way of living in the latter twentieth century. The first buildings were created to be airy, pleasant and modern. There was generous landscaping and cars were separated from pedestrians in the streets and in the shopping precinct. The village is arranged in twenty four neighbourhoods. Punch Croft and Over Minnis are some of the original Span-designed sections.

The development soon ran into difficulties. Originally, the Greater London Council was going to buy 450 of the properties for renting. This idea was dropped when the leadership of the GLC went into Conservative hands. This reduced the financial viability of the development and of the planned social mix of residents. Another problem in the early years was that some lenders were sceptical about the unconventional design of the properties and would not give mortgages.

Span, the original developer, sold the project to Bovis in 1971 for £2.65 million. Bovis increased the size of the development, increasing density and giving less attention to design or provision of public space.

== Facilities ==
The village has rugby and football clubs, while Ash Green Sports Centre includes a gym and badminton, tennis and squash courts. There are also shops, parks, a primary school, a library, a special needs school and a fire station.

In the 2000s, the shopping centre became run-down due to lack of maintenance from overseas absentee landlords. In spite of plans being put forward in 2008 to redesign the village's shops, the need for renovation continued, and in 2023 the centre was bought by new owners who promised a "much-needed enhancement" of the centre.

== Transport ==
=== Rail ===
The nearest National Rail station to New Ash Green is Longfield, located 2.3 miles (3.7 km) away.

=== Buses ===
New Ash Green is served by Brookline Coaches route 479 and 1st Bus Stop route 489. These connect it with Bluewater, Gravesend & Longfield.

=== Notable residents ===
Christopher Bowes, frontman of Alestorm and founding member of Gloryhammer
