= Fabian S. Woodley =

British newspaperman

Fabian Strachan Woodley, MC (19 July 1888 – 8 August 1957) was a British newspaperman, a soldier in the Great War, a schoolmaster, and a poet.

== Early life and education ==
Fabian Strachan Woodley was born on 19 July 1888, in Redland, Bristol, the son of William Augustus Woodley jnr. (1855–1933), a solicitor and part-proprietor of the Somerset County Gazette, and Ada Constance Woodley, née Strachan (d. 29 December 1920); he had one younger brother, Seymour Woodley. His father remarried following the death of his mother in 1920.

Woodley's paternal grandfather was William Augustus Woodley (1817–1891), proprietor of the Somerset County Gazette from 1843. His great-grandfather, Rev. George Woodley (bap. 1786, d. 1846), was also a poet.

Woodley was educated at Cheltenham College (1903–07, Southwood House) and University College, Oxford (BA, 1911). During his time at Cheltenham, he was a member of the Clifton Rugby Club; at Oxford, he was captain of his college rugby team.

Woodley's family were members of the Church of England. However, he was married in a Catholic church (1917), and he left money in his will to the administrator of a Catholic church, for the good of the poor of the parish (1957); it is therefore possible that Woodley converted to Catholicism in early life.

== Marriage ==
Woodley married Ida Leonora Lees on 20 October 1917 at the Pro-Cathedral of the Holy Apostles, Clifton, whilst serving with the Royal Munster Fusiliers. His wife was granted a decree of nullity of marriage on 15 June 1922, on the grounds of ‘the inability of her husband to consummate the marriage’. Subsequently, Ida Lees married Major Henry Aplin, DSO, TD, on 6 August 1924. Major Alpin had also served with the Royal Munster Fusiliers. He died suddenly on 9 July 1928.

== Career ==
After university, Woodley appeared set for a career in newspapers, joining the staff of the Bristol Times and Mirror, and then moving to a London paper.

Woodley served with distinction in World War I. In September 1914 he was appointed to a temporary commission in the New Army (often referred to as Kitchener's Army) and posted to the 8th Service Battalion of the Royal Munster Fusiliers. He was promoted to lieutenant in September 1915. He was appointed acting Captain on several occasions, 'whilst commanding Companies'.

Woodley was presented with three Divisional Parchment Certificates for gallantry in action and was awarded the Military Cross in October 1916: 'For conspicuous gallantry during operations. By his skill and determination he beat off three counter-attacks of the enemy, who were endeavouring to reach his trench. Four days later he led his men in two attacks with great pluck'. When recommending him for a permanent commission in August, 1918, his Commanding Officer wrote: "This officer has served continuously in France for a period of two years and 8 months, and has commanded a Company both in and out of the line, for 2½ years”. The Gloucestershire Echo of Wednesday, 22 May 1918 reported Woodley had been wounded.

Woodley's medals (Military Cross, 1914-15 Star, British War Medal and Victory Medal) were auctioned by Dix Noonan Webb Ltd in May 2017, realising £3,400.

After the war, Woodley obtained a Diploma for Journalism (1920, presumably from London University), and worked with his father on the staff of the Somerset County Gazette, at Taunton.

Woodley then taught English at several schools, including Wrekin College, and served with the Officers Training Corps; he retired as a teacher at the Peter Symonds School, Winchester (a boys' grammar school), where he had taught for many years.

Woodley was a director of the Somerset County Gazette group of newspapers, founded by his grandfather, William Augustus Woodley senior.

== Poetry ==
Woodley's only book of poetry, A Crown of Friendship, was published in 1921 by the family publishing and printing company, Woodley, Williams & Dunsford Ltd of Taunton. The book was 62 pages long and sold for 2s 6d. It contained 35 poems; eight of the poems were written during the war; two of the poems commemorate his mother, who had died the year before.

The subject matter of some of the poems has caused Woodley to be categorised as a Uranian poet by some later critics. Considered more broadly, Woodley is a Georgian poet, using the term as a description of a poetic style (characterised by romanticism, sentimentality and hedonism), rather than in its strict sense.

A Crown of Friendship was reviewed in several newspapers in the south-west of England, but it does not appear to have been noticed nationally. The reviews were generally favourable, but only hinted at the ‘uranian’ nature of some of the poems. The Cheltenham Chronicle observed ‘There is a generous note running throughout—the love and loyalty of a young and ardent soul for his friends—schoolmates, college mates, comrades in the Great War’. The Exeter and Plymouth Gazette thought that ‘In some of the poems the Greek spirit is dominant, in others that of Faerie, and the poet loves Nature, the Great Mother’. The review in the Bath Chronicle and Weekly Gazette included a summary of Woodley's life up to 1921.

== Will ==
The Taunton Courier, and Western Advertiser reported that ‘Mr. Fabian Strachan Woodley, of Abbey Hill Hotel, Winchester, .... who died on August 8 last [1957], left £30,445 14s 5d gross, £30,340 11s 2d net value (duty paid £5,753). He left £500 to the administrator of St. Peter's Church, Jewry-street, Winchester, for the good of the poor of the parish.
