= The love that dare not speak its name =

Phrase from a poem

The love that dare not speak its name is a phrase from the last line of the poem "Two Loves" by Lord Alfred Douglas, written in September 1892 and published in the Oxford magazine The Chameleon in December 1894. It was mentioned at Oscar Wilde's gross indecency trial and is usually interpreted as a euphemism for homosexuality.

In Wilde's definition, "the love that dare not speak its name" was:

"The love that dare not speak its name" in this century is such a great affection of an elder for a younger man as there was between David and Jonathan, such as Plato made the very basis of his philosophy, and such as you find in the sonnets of Michelangelo and Shakespeare. It is that deep spiritual affection that is as pure as it is perfect. It dictates and pervades great works of art, like those of Shakespeare and Michelangelo, and those two letters of mine, such as they are. It is in this century misunderstood, so much misunderstood that it may be described as "the love that dare not speak its name", and on that account of it I am placed where I am now. It is beautiful, it is fine, it is the noblest form of affection. There is nothing unnatural about it. It is intellectual, and it repeatedly exists between an elder and a younger man, when the elder man has intellect, and the younger man has all the joy, hope and glamour of life before him. That it should be so, the world does not understand. The world mocks at it, and sometimes puts one in the pillory for it..

== See also ==
- "The Love That Dares to Speak Its Name", a 1976 poem by James Kirkup that was examined in another blasphemy trial.
