= Keith Godwin =

English sculptor

- Born: 17 April 1916; Warsop, Nottinghamshire
- Died: 1991 (aged 75); Sudbury, Suffolk
- Education: Nottingham; Leicester College of Art; Royal College of Art
- Notable work: Pastorale, Vigilance
- Style: Modern
- Elected: RSBA, RCA, MAFA

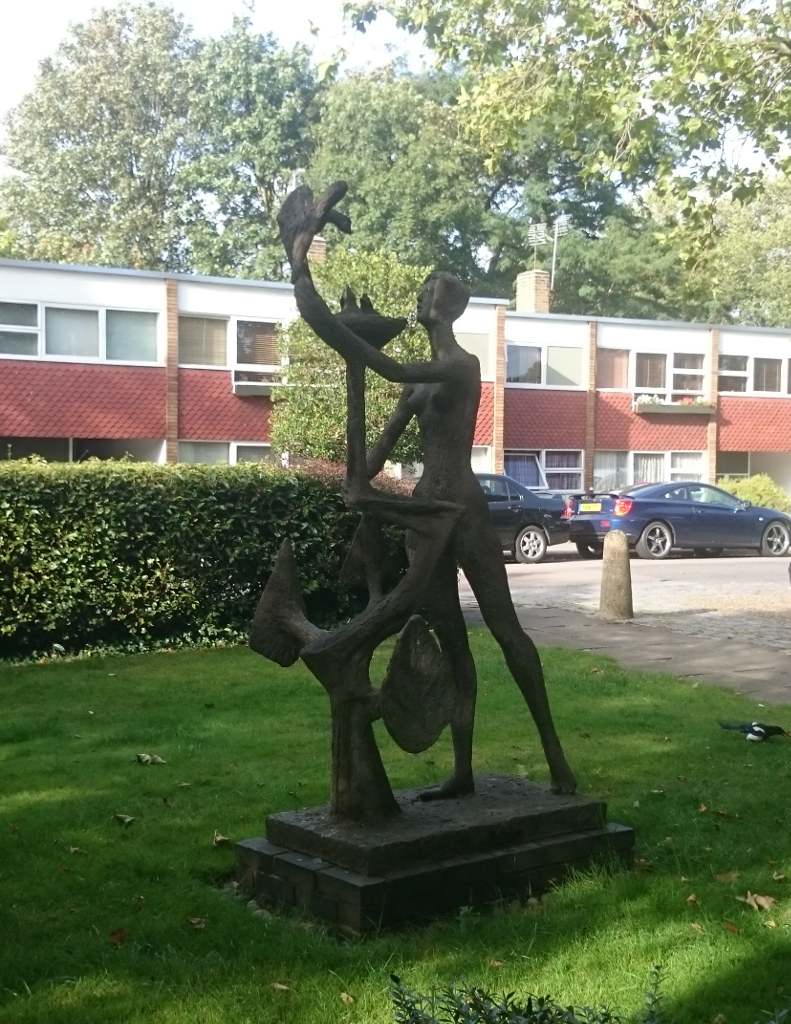
Pastorale at Span Developments Parkleys in Ham, London

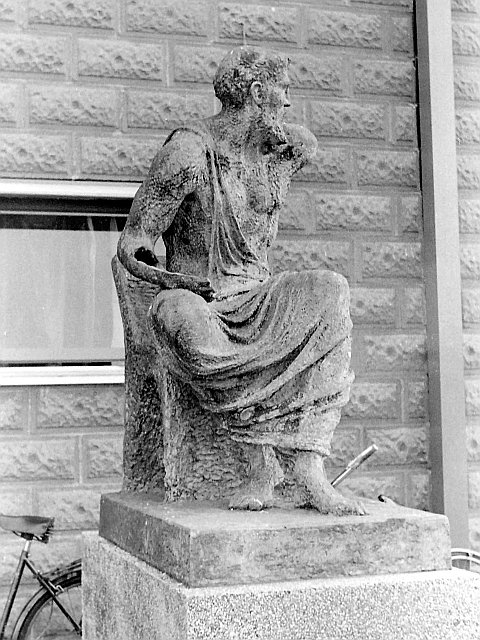
The Philosopher, Harlow

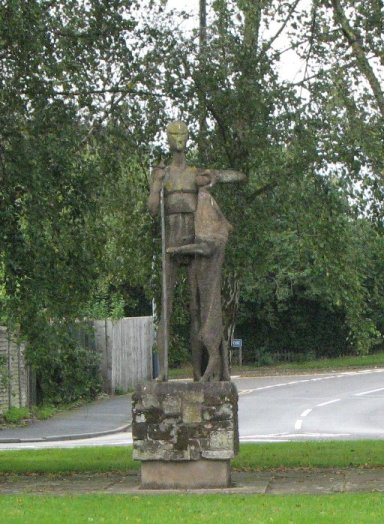
Guy and the Boar, Warwick

Keith Godwin (17 April 1916 – 1991) was an English sculptor.

== Early life and education ==
Keith Godwin was born in Warsop, Nottinghamshire in 1916, the son of a Nottinghamshire coal-miner. He attended Mansfield School of Art and, between 1935 and 1939 Nottingham and Leicester colleges of Art. In 1939 he attended the Royal College of Art until 1940, returning after the war in 1946 when Frank Dobson was Professor of Sculpture and graduating in 1947.

== Career ==
Godwin taught at Bromley School of Art and at Goldsmiths during the early 1950s alongside Harold Wilson Parker and Bobby Jones. At that time he lived in Blackheath. He then worked at Hammersmith School of Art from 1957 until 1967 where Laurence Broderick was amongst his students. He moved on to Manchester Regional College of Art where he worked until 1982. He was a member of the Manchester Academy of Fine Arts and served as its president between 1978 and 1983.

== Works ==
Godwin worked in a variety of materials including stone, bronze, terracotta and fibreglass. His modernist style is considered to follow Maillol more than the expressionist style of Lehmbruck.

He first came to public prominence in 1951. He exhibited several works at the South Bank as part of the Festival of Britain including a relief of Neptune in Basil Spence's Sea and Ships exhibit and his life-size figures of Alfred Russel Wallace, Charles Darwin and Thomas Henry Huxley in The Living World section. The same year he exhibited the terracotta Sitting woman and bath stone Mother and child at the Exhibition of the Royal Scottish Academy of Painting, Sculpture and Architecture, The One-Hundred-and-Twenty-Fifth.

Pastorale, a bronze depicting a woman and nesting birds on a theme of homemaking, was commissioned for Span Developments' influential Parkleys housing estate in Ham, London in 1956. The unveiling ceremony, performed by Sir Hugh Casson was filmed by Pathé. Span subsequently commissioned Godwin for a piece for their 1958 Blackheath development. The Architect and Society is the figure of a man set into a niche supporting a weight of concrete satirising the developer's struggle with the local authority to obtain permission to build there.

Four reliefs attributed to Godwin by Pevsner adorn Reed's early 1960s building on the corner of Half Moon Street and the A4, Piccadilly in London. They depict an owl in a tree, Neptune, a Harlequin with guitar and Diana the huntress.

The Philosopher in Harlow was commissioned by Essex County Council for the new Harlow Technical College in 1960. Constructed in fibreglass and executed in 1961–62, it is sited in College Square in Harlow Town Centre.

Guy and the Boar, commissioned by the Annol Development Company in 1964 and presented to Warwick Council, is situated on a traffic island on the A429 road in Warwick. It commemorates Guy of Warwick and the boar he killed, one of his many heroic feats. The sculpture is made of cast concrete, set on a stone plinth and concrete base.

Also in 1964 Godwin produced a "Wool Mural" for the entrance hall of the International Wool Secretariat headquarters Wool House in Carlton Gardens.

In 1970 the Scott Trust commissioned a piece from Godwin to celebrate the centenary of the Manchester Evening News. A 5.5 metres (18 ft) two-part work in steel on a red granite aggregate base, the latter reflecting the red stone of the neighbouring John Rylands Library. Although Godwin did not name the work it was called Vigilance by Laurence Scott, grandson of C. P. Scott, and was unveiled by Sir William Hayley in May 1971. It stood outside the newspaper's offices until 2003 when it was removed during development of the Spinningfields site but has not since been reinstated, despite the developer's commitment to do so.

Other works by Godwin include Polar Theme at Philips former Laboratories in Salfords, Redhill, Surrey and Fountain at ATV Elstree Studios. Godwin's smaller works include a series of plaster figures made for the Imperial War Museum depicting a WRNS rating, a WVS tea-lady and a Landgirl.

== Death and legacy ==
Godwin died at Sudbury, Suffolk in early 1991, aged 75. The Manchester Academy of Fine Arts commemorates him with the Keith Godwin Sculpture Award, presented to a young sculptor every year.

Professional and academic associations
Preceded by Roger Hampson	President of the Manchester Academy of Fine Arts; 1978–84	Succeeded by Norman Clifford Jacques
