= Uranians =

Gay poetry movement active 1858–1930

The Uranians were a late-19th-century and early-20th-century clandestine group of up to several dozen male homosexual poets and prose writers who principally wrote on the subject of the love of (or by) adolescent boys. In a strict definition they were an English literary and cultural movement; in a broader definition there were also American Uranians. (Note: d'Arch Smith defines the Uranians as a "group of poets on the edge of, and sometimes outside, the circle [of 1890s writers such as Symonds, Wilde, Douglas and Fr. Rolfe] who celebrated in their poetry the love of adolescent boys." The Encyclopedia of Homosexuality describes them as "a circle of English writers whose main interest was in the adolescent boy (pederasts in the classical sense)". Mader defines them as "a loosely knit group of British and American homosexual poets writing between approximately 1880 and 1930, sharing a number of basic cultural and literary assumptions derived on one hand from Walter Pater, and on the other from Walt Whitman." Kaylor uses the definition "a cluster of paederastic writers active in England from roughly 1858-1930".) The movement reached its peak between the late 1880s and mid 1890s, but has been regarded as stretching between 1858, when William Johnson Cory's poetry collection Ionica appeared, and 1930, the year of publication of Samuel Elsworth Cottam's Cameos of Boyhood and Other Poems and of E. E. Bradford's last collection, Boyhood.

== Etymology ==
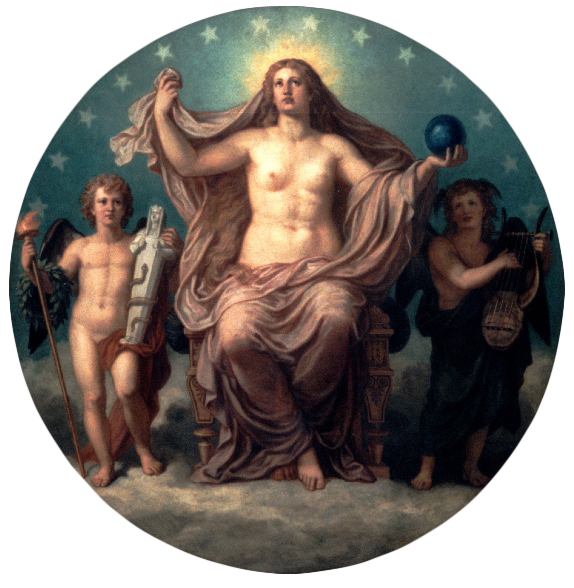
The Greek goddess Aphrodite Urania (depicted as her Roman interpretation, Venus Urania), from whose name the term "Uranian" was derived

English advocates of homosexual emancipation such as Edward Carpenter and John Addington Symonds took to using the term "Uranian" to describe a comradely love that would bring about true democracy. The word was coined on the basis of classical sources, being inspired principally by the epithet Aphrodite Urania as discussed in Plato's Symposium. Plato distinguishes two forms of the Greek goddess of love Aphrodite, "the elder, having no mother, who is called the heavenly Aphrodite [Urania] — she is the daughter of Uranus; the younger, who is the daughter of Zeus and Dione — her we call 'common' [Pandemos]." Aphrodite Urania represents a more "celestial" love of body and soul, whereas Aphrodite Pandemos represents a more physical lust.

The term Uranian came to be much used in the circle of Uranian writers for its novelty and euphoniousness, its literal meaning "heavenly" giving it a cachet of the noble and sublime. While the same classical sources supplied the German coinage "Urning" for male homosexuals, as used by the German theorist and campaigner Karl Heinrich Ulrichs in the 1860s, this German derivation ran parallel to the English derivation "Uranian" rather than being its source.

== Movement ==
The Uranian writers formed a rather cohesive group with a well-expressed philosophy. Their work is characterized by an idealised appeal to the history of Ancient Greece, as well as by a use of conservative verse forms. Many Uranian writers borrowed classical Greek themes such as paganism, democracy and male camaraderie or intimacy, applying these concepts to their own time. Besides Greek themes, they made use of Oriental, Christian and other motifs.

The chief poets of the circle were William Johnson Cory, Lord Alfred Douglas, Montague Summers, John Francis Bloxam, Charles Kains Jackson, John Gambril Nicholson, E. E. Bradford, John Addington Symonds, Edmund John, John Moray Stuart-Young, Charles Edward Sayle, Fabian S. Woodley, and several pseudonymous authors such as Philebus (John Leslie Barford), A. Newman (Francis Edwin Murray) and Arthur Lyon Raile (Edward Perry Warren, who wrote A Defence of Uranian Love). The flamboyantly eccentric novelist Frederick Rolfe (also known as "Baron Corvo") was a unifying presence in their social network, both within and without Venice.

Historian Neil McKenna has argued that Uranian poetry had a central role in the upper-class homosexual subcultures of the Victorian period. He insisted that poetry was the main medium through which writers such as Oscar Wilde, Rennell Rodd, 1st Baron Rennell and George Cecil Ives sought to challenge anti-homosexual ideas. The Uranians met each other and stayed in touch through such organisations as the Order of Chaeronea, which was founded by Ives and began holding occasional meetings in London about 1897.

Marginally associated with their world were more famous writers such as Edward Carpenter, as well as the obscure but prophetic poet-printer Ralph Chubb. His majestic volumes of lithographs celebrated the adolescent boy as an Ideal. A case has been made to range the Americans George Edward Woodberry and Cuthbert Wright among the Uranian poets. Although not expatriates, they were well-versed in the Uranian material being written in England, sought to influence an English Uranian audience and struck a rather English pose in their poetry.

The Uranians' activity was the first stage in the effort to rehabilitate the ancient Greek notion of paiderasteia, which was ultimately unsuccessful. The age of consent today in Great Britain is legally set at 16, regardless of gender, in most circumstances.

== Publications on Uranian poets and poetry ==
There are two book-length studies of the Uranians: Love In Earnest by Timothy d'Arch Smith (1970) and Secreted Desires: The Major Uranians: Hopkins, Pater and Wilde by Michael Matthew Kaylor (2006; available as an open-access E-text). Kaylor expands the Uranian canon by situating several major Victorians within the group. Other critics, such as Richard Dellamora (Masculine Desire: The Sexual Politics of Victorian Aestheticism, 1990) and Linda Dowling (Hellenism and Homosexuality in Victorian Oxford, 1994) have also contributed to the limited knowledge about this group. Paul Fussell discusses Uranian poetry in his book The Great War and Modern Memory (1975), suggesting that it provided a model for homoerotic representations in the war poets of World War I (e.g. Wilfred Owen).

Poems by the Uranians – as well as by their American counterparts, sometimes called the "Calamites" after the "Calamus" section in Walt Whitman's Leaves of Grass – were included in Men and Boys: An Anthology (1924), edited by Edward Mark Slocum, which was republished with a new introduction in 1978. More recent anthologies and republications of Uranian poetry are Kaylor's exhaustive two-volume Lad's Love: An Anthology of Uranian Poetry and Prose (2010a and 2010b) and a three-volume series by the Gay Men's Press, each volume introduced by Paul I. Webb: To Boys Unknown: Poems by Rev. E. E. Bradford (1988), In the Dreamy Afternoon: Poems by John Gambril Nicholson (1989) and Blue Boys: Poems by Philebus, Edmund John, Cuthbert Wright (1990).
