= Arthur Moss =

American writer

Arthur Harold Moss
- Born: November 1889; Greenwich Village, New York City, U.S.
- Died: February 20, 1969 (aged 79–80); Neuilly-sur-Marne, France
- Education: Cornell University
- Occupation: Magazine editor
- Writing career
- Genre: Poetry

Arthur Harold Moss (November 1889 in Greenwich Village – February 20, 1969 in Neuilly-sur-Marne) was an American expatriate poet and magazine editor.

== Life ==
His parents were Polish-Jewish immigrants. Arthur was inducted into the army on September 4, 1918. Arthur did not serve active duty in WW1. He served as a PVT with the QMC (Quarter Masters Corp) in Johnston Florida until he was discharged January 8, 1919. Arthur attended Cornell University for three years, but dropped out.

== The Quill ==
In 1917, he returned to Greenwich Village, founding The Quill with partner Harold Hersey and was managing editor and wrote articles. It included artists Clara Tice, Wood Gaylor, Mark Tobey and Alfred J Frueh; writers included Ben De Casseres.

He married Millia Davenport (1895–1992) and worked with her at The Quill. They co-authored, The Quill: For And By Greenwich Village, vol.4, no.8, 1919. They separated shortly thereafter. She went on to design costumes, and in 1948 wrote The Book of Costume. In 1920, he hired his future wife Florence Gilliam to edit Quill. In 1921 they moved to Paris, into a small apartment near Shakespeare and Company, the bookstore owned by Sylvia Beach.

== Gargoyle ==
In August 1921, they began publishing Gargoyle, an intense literary magazine. Gargoyle published reproductions of Henri Matisse, Pablo Picasso, André Derain, Amedeo Modigliani, Paul Cézanne. Writers contributing to the publication included Ezra Pound, Robert Coates, Malcolm Cowley, Hart Crane, Stephen Vincent Benét, H.D., Edna St. Vincent Millay, Sinclair Lewis and Cuthbert Wright. Without outside backing and lacking a subscriber base, in October 1922, Gargoyle ceased publication. For the next few years Arthur would write a column for The New York Times and the Paris Herald.

=== Hemingway ===
Ernest Hemingway and his wife moved to Paris in December 1921. He loved books and frequented Shakespeare and Company where he met Moss, who convinced Hemingway to submit articles to Gargoyle. These early writings drew the attention of Robert McAlmon. The original writings are now in the JFK Library.

== Boulevardier ==
In 1927 Arthur began publishing Boulevardier with Erskine Gwynne. Patterned after The New Yorker, one of the regular illustrators was Raymond Peynet. Contributors included Michael Arlen, Noël Coward, Louis Bromfield, Sinclair Lewis and Ernest Hemingway.

Moss and Gilliam divorced in 1931. By 1932 he married Evalyn Marvel. He was survived by his widow Doreen Vidal.

== Works ==
- Hiler Harzberg, Arthur Moss (1924). Slapstick and Dumbbell: A Casual Survey of Clowns and Clowning. New York: Lawren Publishers.
- The Legend of the Latin Quarter: Henry Murger and the Birth of Bohemia. Beechhurst Press. 1947. ISBN 978-1-4191-3909-3.
- Second Childhood in Villefranche. Villefranche: Editions de la Rade. 1952.
- Cancan and Barcarolle: The Life and Times of Jacques Offenbach. Exposition Press. 1954. Facsimile Edition. Greenwood Press. March 1976. ISBN 978-0-8371-8045-8.
- Tale of Twelve Cities and Other Poems. Paris: Two Cities Editions. 1963.
- One More River and Other Poems. A.H.Stockwell. 1967.

=== Non-fiction ===
- "The Turkish Myth", The Nation, Arthur Moss & Florence Gilliam, June 23, 1923

=== Editor ===
- Arthur H. Moss, ed. (1918). Greenwich Village anthology of verse: being a compilation of poetry from the pages of the first year's issues of The Quill, a magazine of Greenwich Village. Moss.
