= John Gambril Nicholson =

English poet and educator (1866 - 1931)

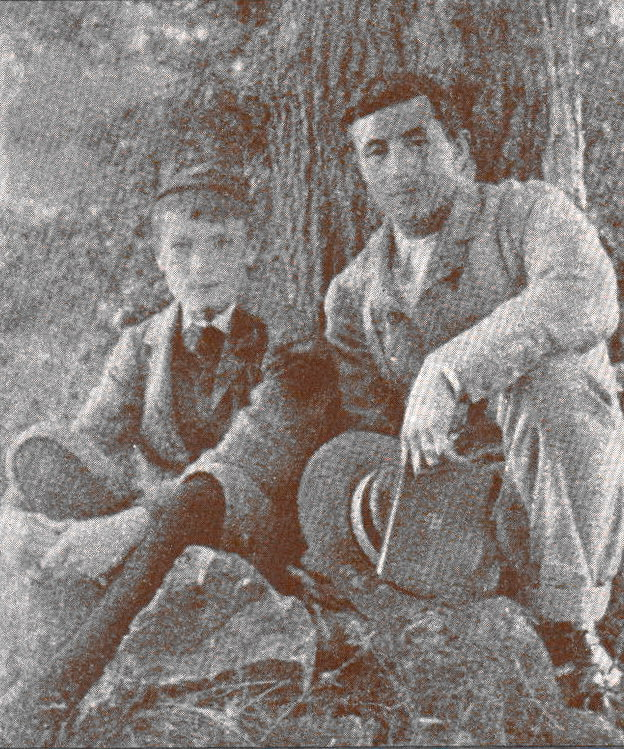
A widely reproduced photograph of Nicholson (right) with Alec Melling, a student to whom he dedicated his second poetry collection, A Chaplet of Southernwood (1896).

John Gambril (Francis) Nicholson (1866–1931) was an English school teacher, poet, and amateur photographer. He was one of the Uranians, a clandestine group of British men who wrote poetry idealizing the beauty and love of adolescent boys. As a school master at various boarding schools in England and Wales, Nicholson formed "passionate friendships" with some of his students, and dedicated much of his poetry to favoured students.

== Biography ==
John Gambrill Nicholson (the Francis was added later and the -ll / -l spelling varied over the years) was born in Essex in 1866. He was educated locally at the King Edward VI Grammar School, Chelmsford, where one of his teachers was Frederick Rolfe, a gay man who would go on to a career as a noted novelist and artist. He studied at Oxford University before entering upon his career as an English Master at various schools in England and Wales: at Buxton (1884–7); Ashton (1887–8); Rydal Mount School, Colwyn Bay (1888–94), where he also coached the football team; Arnold House School, Chester (1894–6); and Stationers' School, Hornsey, north London (1896–1925, retired).

Nicholson was a member of the Order of Chaeronea, a secret society for homosexuals founded in 1897 by fellow Uranian George Ives. He was also an officer of the British Society for the Study of Sex Psychology, an organization founded in 1913 and largely devoted to the study and defense of homosexuality.

Nicholson was an amateur photographer of boys, apparently inspired by the work of Wilhelm von Gloeden.

== Writing ==
Havelock Ellis wrote that Nicholson's verse showed “delicate charm combined with high technical skill.”

Nicholson's first book of poems Love in Earnest (1892) was dedicated to the memory of his mother, but the first section, a sequence of 50 numbered sonnets (which open with "Some lightly love, but mine is Love in Earnest -/My heart is ever faithful while it hears/An echo of itself in thine, though years/Should pass ere its full passion thou returnest"), was dedicated to "W.E.M." This was the flaxen-haired blue-eyed William Ernest Mather (1877–99)—second son of Sir William Mather—a pupil of his at Rydal Mount School 1888–90, who died young after being thrown from his horse. A photograph of Nicholson with Ernest, taken at Llandudno in June 1889, was published in The Book Collector (Summer 1978).

Love in Earnest attracted the notice of the Uranian poets, including John Addington Symonds, and it is believed to have contributed to the use of earnest as a coded term for homosexuality among Uranians. Some scholars have speculated that Oscar Wilde exploited this allusion in his 1895 play The Importance of Being Earnest.

In 1894, Nicholson contributed "The Shadow of the End", an "intensely poetic prose meditation" on the death of a beloved boy, to the sole issue of the Uranian magazine The Chameleon. He also contributed a poem on the topic of nude bathing for the April 1894 issue of The Artist and Journal of Home Culture.

Nicholson's second volume of poetry A Chaplet of Southernwood (1896), celebrated the beauty of another Rydal Mount pupil (1891–94), William Alexander (Alec) Melling (1878–1962).

A third volume of verses A Garland of Ladslove (subtitled "Verses for Victor / To F.V.R. / (1902–1910)") was written for Frank Victor Rushforth (1888–1945), who entered the Indian Civil Service after university. As Timothy d'Arch Smith writes: "Nicholson's friendship with Victor began when the boy was thirteen. It was not altogether a happy relationship for it laboured under the usual difficulty that the boy was not able to respond to the ardour of Nicholson's passion." "Southernwood" and "Ladslove" are alternative English names for the aromatic plant from southern Europe Artemisia abrotanum.

=== The Romance of a Choir-Boy ===
Nicholson's semi-autobiographical novel The Romance of a Choir-Boy was written between 1896 and 1905 but not published until privately printed in 1916. In it his alter ego protagonist Philip Luard chastely pursues the unresponsive twelve-year-old Teddy Faircloth of the title, despite his friend Gerrard urging him to a more sensual approach. The novel ends with the quotation: "Physical intimacies are but surface emotions, forgotten as soon as they are satisfied; whereas spiritual intimacies live in the heart, they are part of our eternal life, and reach beyond the stars." It was reprinted in 2013.

== Works ==
- Love in Earnest: Sonnets, Ballades, and Lyrics (London, 1892)
- A Story of Cliffe School (Bradford, c.1895)
- A Chaplet of Southernwood (Ashover [Derbyshire], 1896)
- In Carrington's duty-week : a private school episode (London, n.d. [1910])
- A Garland of Ladslove (London, 1911)
- The Romance of a Choir Boy (London, 1916)
- Opals and Pebbles (London, 1928)
