= Truslove and Hanson =

Book publisher

Coordinates: 51°30′56.5″N 0°8′11.7″W

- Parent company: W H Smith
- Founded: 1893
- Founder: Joseph Truslove, Frank Hanson
- Country of origin: United Kingdom
- Headquarters location: London
- Nonfiction topics: art, crafts, travel

Truslove & Hanson was a minor independent publishing firm that ran a number of fashionable bookshops in the West End of London. They also printed personalized stationery and bookplates, offered a bookbinding service, and acted as London agents for the State Library of New South Wales. There was a New York branch, Truslove, Hanson & Comba, from 1899 to 1903.

== Partners ==
In 1893 Joseph Truslove, who since 1890 had traded as a bookseller and publisher from 143 Oxford Street, London, went into partnership with Frank Hanson, who had been the London representative of Simpkin Marshall.

In 1899 Truslove and Hanson entered into partnership with T. Ernest Comba and Joseph Shaylor to open a New York office, operating as Truslove, Hanson & Comba from 67 Fifth Avenue. In 1903 this became the New York branch of John Lane. Comba (1851–1921) specialized in selling French, Italian and Spanish books.

== Bookshops ==
Truslove's original premises in 143 Oxford Street were supplemented by a bookshop in Knightsbridge, at 6b Sloane Street (now a Shanghai Tang outlet). This became a fashionable "quality" bookshop, with such customers as Archibald Wavell (Viceroy of India 1943-1947). There was a further bookshop in Mayfair, at 14a Clifford Street (now the London outlet of Kiton).

The bookshops became a subsidiary of W H Smith in 1923, but remained a distinct, up-market brand, tied to Bowes & Bowes after that was acquired by WHS in 1953. The Clifford Street shop was closed in 1958, and the Oxford Street shop in 1963. The Sloane Street premises were moved in 1972.

In 1969, Truslove & Hanson acquired the Times Library.

== Publications ==
Truslove and Hanson were particularly notable as publishers for their list of works on art and design, with Joseph Truslove becoming a member of the Arts Club in 1910.

They published several editions of Frederick Litchfield's Illustrated History of Furniture (7 editions, 1892–1922) and the same author's Pottery and Porcelain (1900, 1912); Fred Miller's Art Crafts for Amateurs (1901); W. G. Paulson Townsend's Embroidery or the Craft of the Needle (1899, 1907), and Plant and Floral Studies for Artists and Craftspeople (1901); and, as Truslove, Hanson and Comba, the American edition of William Millar's classic Plastering Plain and Decorative (1897). From 1899 to 1901 Truslove, Hanson and Comba also published the American edition of The Artist, a monthly review of art and design.

Other notable publications include Henry Ling Roth's, The Natives of Sarawak and British North Borneo (1896) and Oriental Silverwork (1910); John Henry Cardwell's, Men and Women of Soho: Famous and Infamous (1904); and Joseph Shaylor's The Pleasures of Bookland (1914).

== See also ==
- Book trade in the United Kingdom
- Books in the United Kingdom
