= Edmund John =

British poet

- Born: 27 November 1883; United Kingdom
- Died: 28 February 1917 (aged 33); Taormina, Sicily
- Occupation: poet
- Writing career
- Language: English
- Genre: Symbolist
- Notable works: "The Flute of Sardonyx "; "The Wind in the Temple";"Symphonie symbolique"

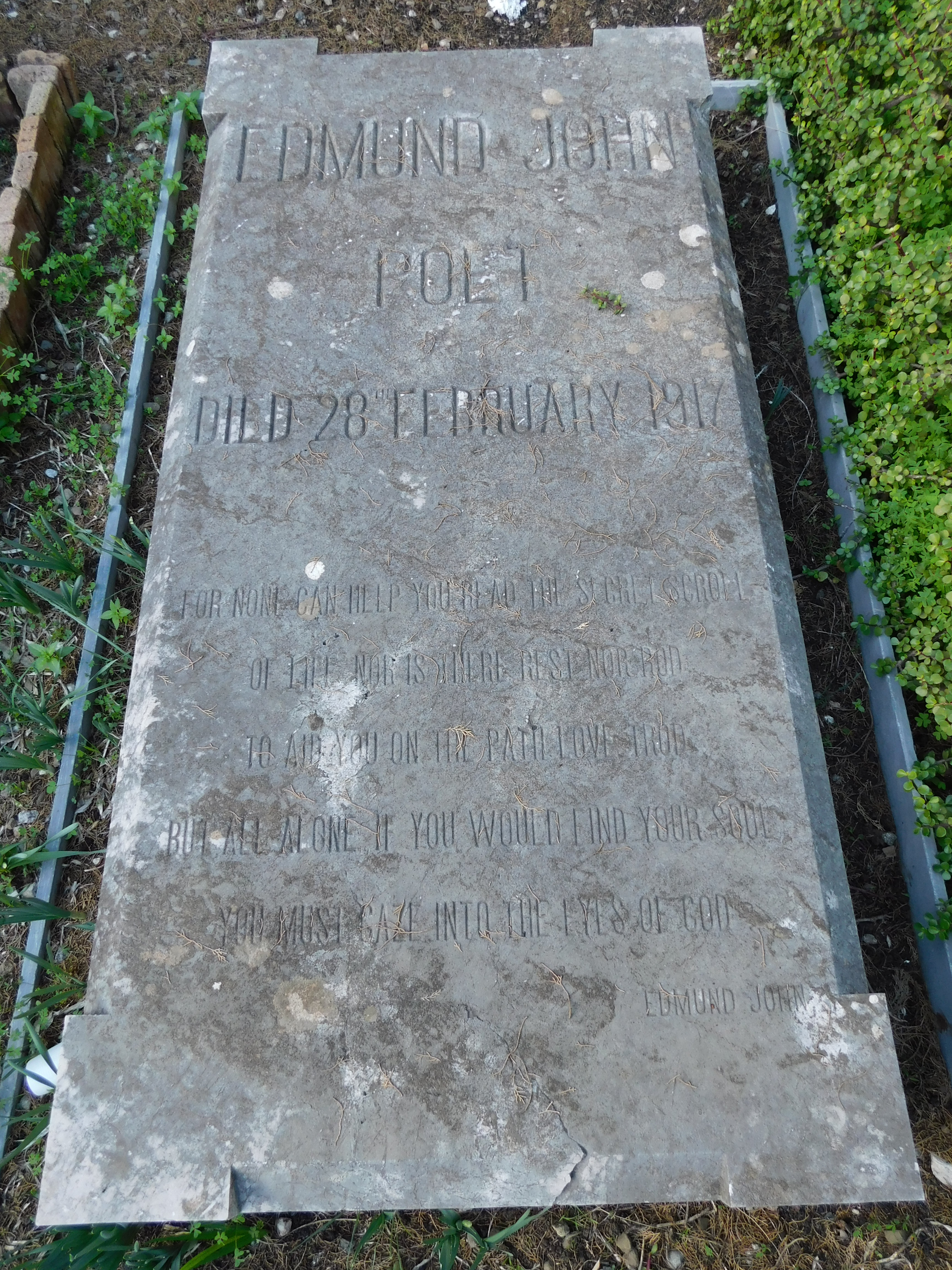
Gravestone in Taormina, Sicily

Edmund John (27 November 1883 – 28 February 1917) was a British poet of the Uranian poetry school. His verses were modeled on the Symbolist poetry of Algernon Charles Swinburne and other earlier poets. Much of his work was condemned by critics for being overly decadent and unfashionable. He fought in the First World War but was invalided out in 1916. He died a year later in Taormina, Sicily.

== Bibliography ==
- The Flute of Sardonyx: Poems (1913)
- The Wind in the Temple: Poems (1915)
- Symphonie Symbolique (1919)
