= Order of Chaeronea =

Secret society for homosexuals

The Order of Chaeronea was a secret society initially from the United Kingdom for the cultivation of a homosexual moral, ethical, cultural, and spiritual ethos. Founded by George Cecil Ives in 1897, based on his belief that homosexuals would not be accepted openly in society, the Order offered a network for underground communication.

The secret Order was named for the 338 BCE battle where the Sacred Band of Thebes was ultimately defeated.

== Establishment and organization ==
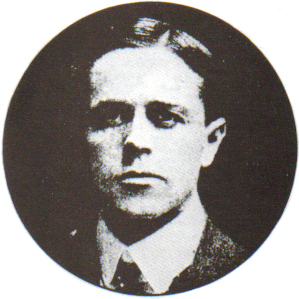
George Cecil Ives around 1900

In the 1860s, the German lawyer Karl Heinrich Ulrichs may have been the first modern European to publicly declare his homosexuality. Ulrichs wrote dozens of books and pamphlets which argued that the preference for same-sex love is hereditary and involuntary, therefore it should not be a crime. He introduced the word "Uranian" as a synonym for homosexual relations, and even demanded that homosexuals be granted the right to marry.

Less radical thinkers in Germany, Austria and France began to argue that same-sex attraction and relations between men were a psychological disturbance to be treated by physicians, rather than a crime to be punished by the courts. As a result, by 1876 "psychological" had become a term that Oscar Wilde and his peers used to describe anything pertaining to gay sex. At the same time, McKenna writes, "aestheticism seemed to spring to life, fully formed, towards the end of the 1870s." It was "a heady mix of art, idealism and politics, which sought to propagate a new gospel of Beauty."

In 1897, shortly after meeting Wilde, George Cecil Ives, a friend of Wilde's whose diaries contain many new details of the writer's life, founded the Order of Chaeronea, aimed at promoting 'the Cause'. The society was named "after the battle where the male lovers of the Theban Band were slaughtered in 338 BC." Ives and other members dated letters and other materials from the year of the battle, so that, for instance, 1900 would be written as C.2238.

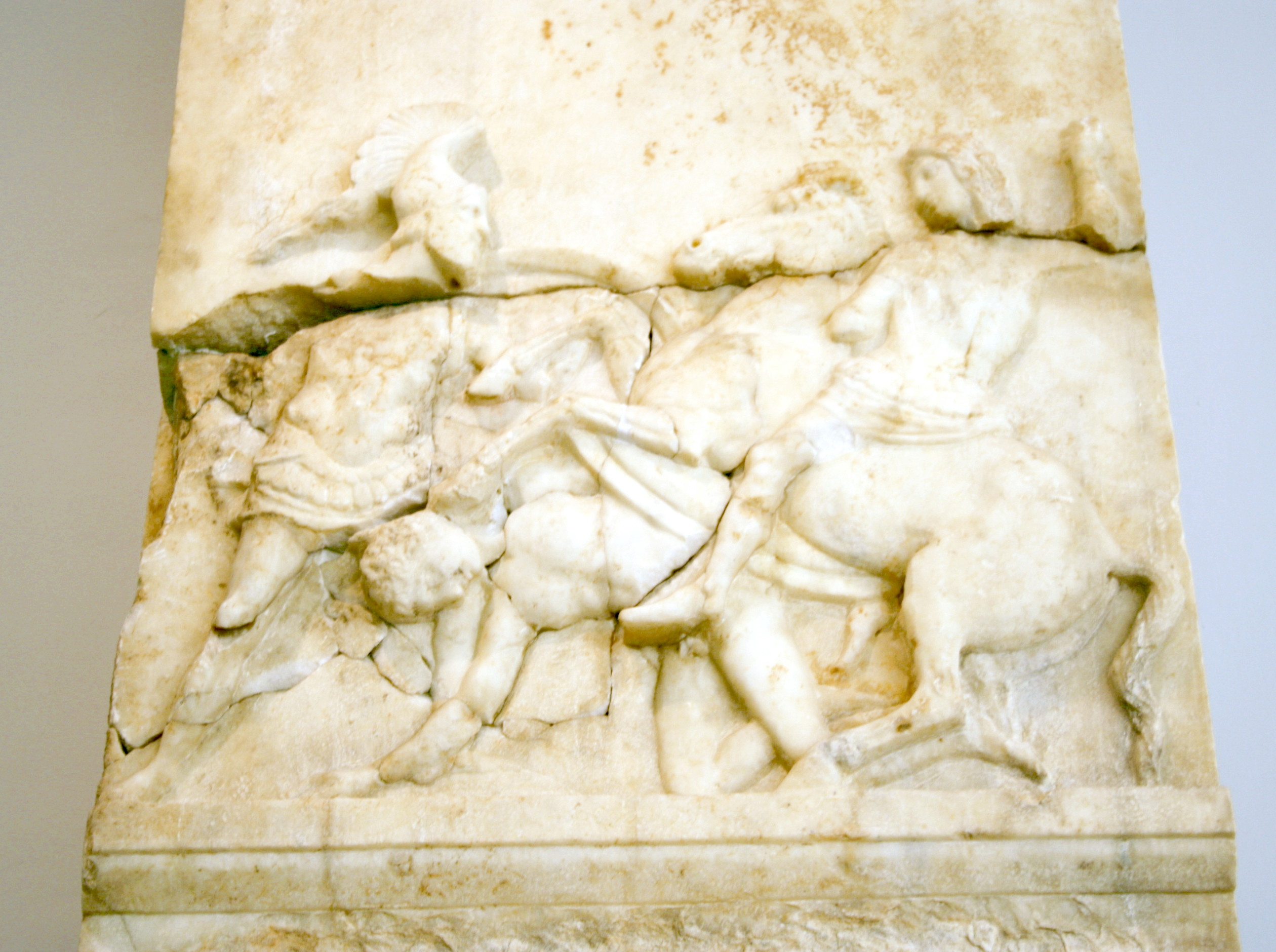
Funerary relief for Athenian footman Panchares, who probably fell at the Battle of Chaeronea.

The 'Rules of Purpose' stated that the Order was to be 'A Religion, A Theory of Life, and Ideal of Duty', although its purpose was primarily political. Members of the Order were 'Brothers of the Faith', and were required to swear under the 'Service of Initiation' that "you will never vex or persecute lovers" and "That all real love shall be to you as sanctuary."

The group was male-dominated, but did include a few lesbian members.

At its peak 'the Elect' numbered perhaps two or three hundred, but no membership lists survive. Oscar Wilde was, however, probably an early recruit, along with his lover Lord Alfred "Bosie" Douglas . Other members may have included Charles Kains Jackson, Samuel Elsworth Cottam, Montague Summers, and John Gambril Nicholson.

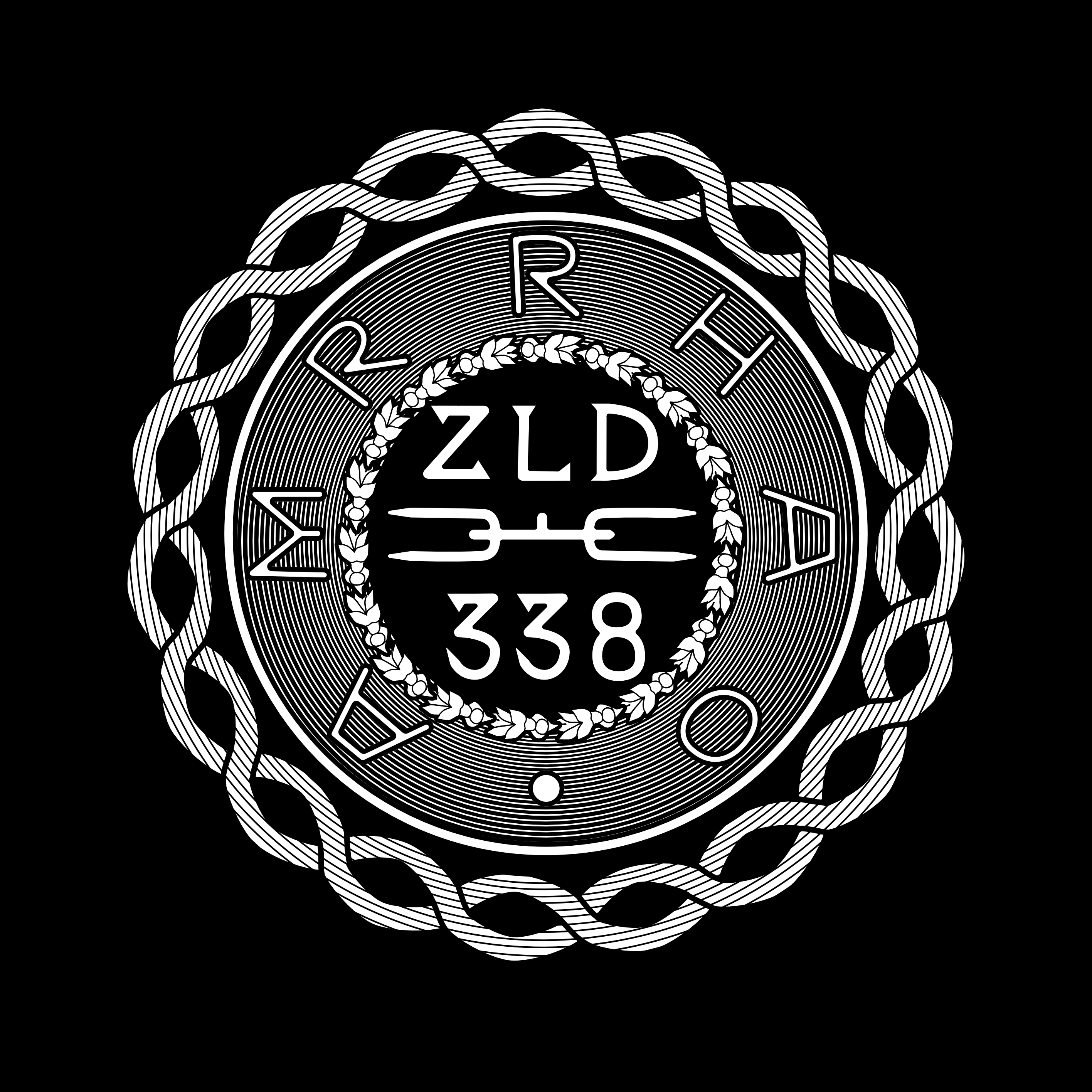
Order of Chaeronea seal, transcribed from a signet ring which appeared in a Norfolk auction room in 2023, illustrated by Ben Thompson @Bye.BT.

An elaborate system of rituals, ceremonies, a service of initiation, seals, codes, and passwords were established. The Order, according to Ives' notebooks, had a specific purpose, distinct prescriptions and philosophy, and its particular symbolism: the "sign-word" AMRRHAO, the meaning of which has never been uncovered, and "the seal of the double wreath." The prerequisites of membership were indicated to be "Zeal, Learning and Discipline." The principle of secrecy was conveyed by the metaphor of "The Chain" underlining that one should never reveal any information about the order or its members. The writings of Walt Whitman were particularly revered.

Ives was keen to stress that the Order was to be an ascetic movement, not to be used as a forum for men to meet men for sex, although he accepted a degree of 'passionate sensuality' could take place. He also believed that love and sex between men was a way to undermine the rigid class system, as a true form of democracy. The Order soon became a worldwide organisation, and Ives took advantage of every opportunity to spread the word about the "Cause."

In Ives' words:

We believe in the glory of passion. We believe in the inspiration of emotion. We believe in the holiness of love. Now some in the world without have been asking as to our faith, and mostly we find that we have no answer for them. Scoffers there be, to whom we need not reply, and foolish ones to whom our words would convey no meaning. For what are words? Symbols of kindred comprehended conceptions, and like makes appeal to like.
