= John Francis Bloxam =

John Francis Bloxam (also known as Jack Bloxam) (1873–1928) was an English Uranian author and churchman. Bloxam was an undergraduate at Exeter College, Oxford when his story, "The Priest and the Acolyte", appeared in the sole issue of The Chameleon: a Bazaar of Dangerous and Smiling Chances, a periodical which he also served as editor. The story details the love affair of a young Anglican priest and his lover, a 14-year-old boy. The affair, when discovered, triggers a suicide pact of both priest and boy. A poem, A Summer Hour, also with pederastic themes, appeared in The Artist. The contents of The Chameleon, which also included Lord Alfred Douglas's notorious poem Two Loves, would be used against Oscar Wilde in his trial. Bloxam was a convert to Anglo-Catholicism, and became a priest.

== Selected publications ==
- "The Priest and the Acolyte", The Chameleon: a Bazaar of Dangerous and Smiling Chances [1894].

== References and sources ==
Sources

- Hanson, Ellis. Decadence and Catholicism. Harvard University Press, 1997.
- Koven, Seth. Slumming: Sexual and Social Politics in Victorian London. Princeton University Press, 2002.
- Roden, Frederick S. Same-Sex Desire in Victorian Religious Culture. Palgrave Macmillan, 2003.
