= Span Developments =

British property development company

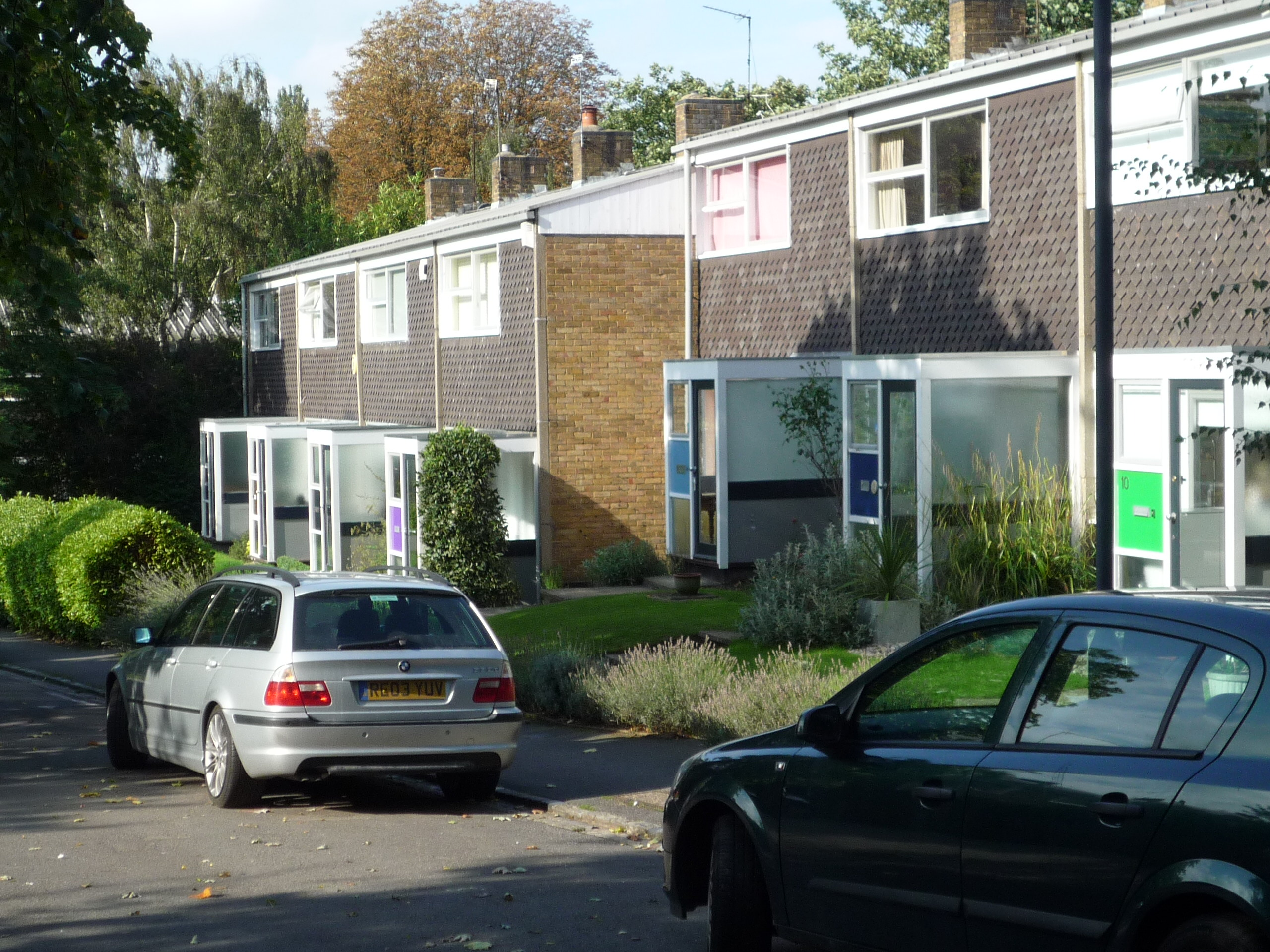
- The Keep, Blackheath, a typical set of houses to Eric Lyons' T2 design
- Company type: property development
- Industry: construction
- Founded: 1956
- Founders: Eric Lyons, Geoffrey Townsend
- Area served: Southern England

Span Developments Limited was a British property development company formed in the late 1950s by Geoffrey Townsend working in long and close partnership with Eric Lyons as consultant architect. During its most successful period in the 1960s, Span built over 2,000 homes in London, Surrey, Kent and East Sussex—mainly two- and three-bedroom single-family homes and apartment buildings.

== Formation ==
Lyons and Townsend first met whilst studying architecture at evening-classes at the Regent Street Polytechnic in the 1930s. Townsend started his first architectural practice, Modern Homes, in Richmond in 1937 and Lyons joined soon after. Commissions were sparse in the immediate pre-war period but they reunited after the war, working mostly on war-damage restoration and house alteration projects and the business progressed. In 1948 they secured a contract to design a development of 24 flats in Whitton. This development, Oaklands, exhibited many of the features of their subsequent successful style.

== Features ==
Span were notable for several characteristics, radical for their time, that continue to inspire and influence. Lyons and Townsend shared a vision of social housing.

The test of good housing is not whether it can be built easily, but whether it can be lived in easily.

— Eric Lyons

Architecturally, their designs combined modernist design with attention to detail and harmony with the suburban environment. Their house designs usually had mono-pitch roofs with large, clerestory high level windows and open-plan interiors. However, these were softened by more traditional features such as hung tiles and stock brick work.

The Span ethos was to build "homes within a garden", so most developments include large integrated landscape communal gardens. The exterior space is a recognised feature and many Span developments are car-free – a radical difference from other post war developments. Concealed communal parking was deliberately located to encourage opportunities for social interaction.

Commercially, Lyons and Townsend targeted the young professional first-time property-buyer market and deliberately kept costs low, working to lower profit margins than established contemporaries. The use of modular designs and the fabrication of some components on-site also helped keep construction costs as low as possible. The relatively high housing density also added to the economies but was often a matter of conflict with planning authorities.

Span, and Townsend in particular, promoted the concept of a legally constituted Residents' Association, membership of which was a condition of sale, and which included covenants that placed mutual obligations on the residents to maintain the properties and grounds.

== Key projects ==
In 1953, frustrated with a lack of support from developers and funders for their ideas for modern economic housing, Townsend established Bargood Estates, a development company of his own in conjunction with Henry Cushman, an agent for the Alliance Building Society. Bargood Estates went on to build 12 Townhouses at Chapel Street and North Walls Chichester embodying many of the Span features of openness, light and community,1963.

To become a developer, Townsend had to resign from RIBA due to their conflict of interest rules of the time. Although the partnership with Lyons was legally ended, they continued to share the same business premises, the studio offices at Lyons' home, Mill House, East Molesey, maintaining their close collaboration.

Span went on to develop 73 schemes, comprising 2,134 dwellings, up to the end of the 1960s.

=== Parkleys ===
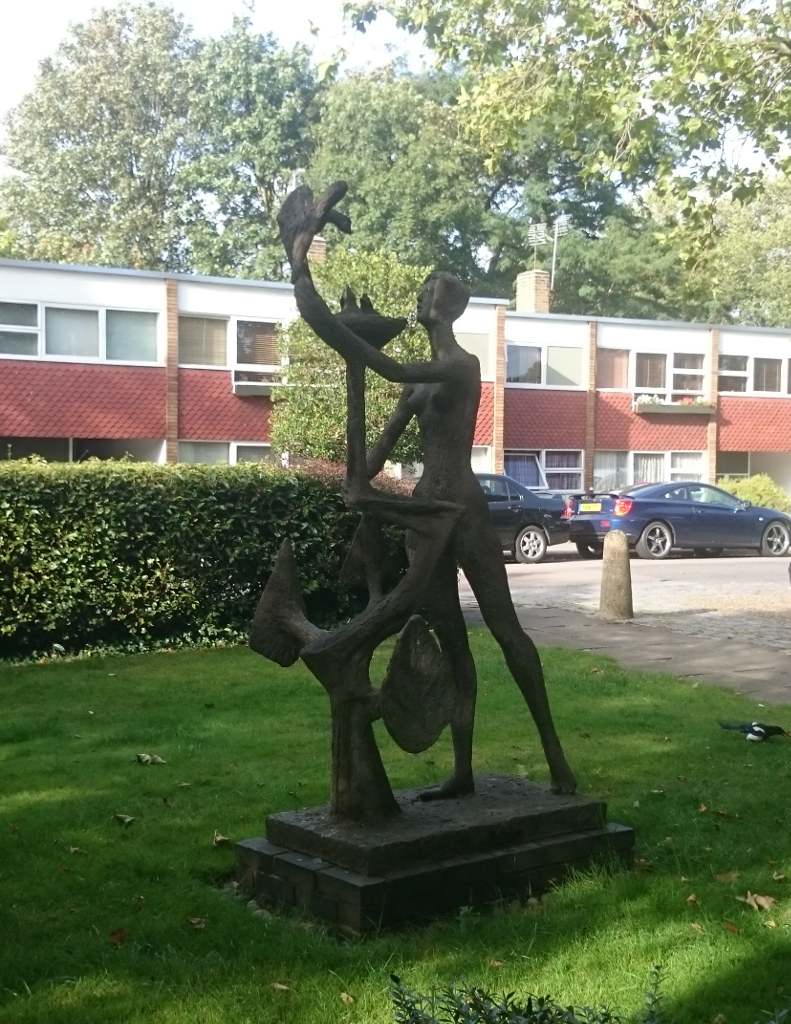
Pastorale by Keith Godwin at Parkleys, Ham

Townsend and Cushman acquired four acres of the former Ham Farm Nursery near Ham Common, Ham, London, and the adjacent Cairn House, formerly known as The Elms, that fronted the Upper Ham Road. With Lyons as consultant architect, the development, Parkleys, comprised 169 flats across fifteen two and three-storey H-plan blocks and a block of six shops and maisonettes set in high quality landscaping that carefully retained many mature trees and plantings from the former properties. The Elms was demolished to make way for the scheme. Wates were the builder. As the project progressed, Townsend and Cushman were joined by another former Regent Street Polytechnic student, Leslie Bilsby (who had previously worked with Ernő Goldfinger and Denys Lasdun), to form Priory Hall Ltd. Towards the end of the project, in 1955, landscape architect, Ivor Cunningham joined Lyons' practice. A final addition to the landscaping at Parkleys was the commission of a statue, Pastorale, by artist, Keith Godwin, unveiled in 1956 by Sir Hugh Casson and filmed by Pathé. Parkleys won several awards and established Lyons and Townsend's reputation.

In the late 1950s, Townsend moved the development company to one of the properties within Parkleys. All fifteen blocks, named after poets, were listed Grade II in December 1998. Along with the adjacent Ham Farm Road, Parkleys was declared a conservation area in 2003. Ian Nairn described it in 1962 as "the most refreshing new housing in Surrey."

=== The Priory ===
Bilsby had acquired land in Blackheath near to his home, and this became the group's next project, The Priory. This was the first of nineteen developments in Blackheath and of thirteen within the Cator estate. Constructed between 1954 and 1956, the development comprised 61 flats of type A, B and C and, like Parkleys, care was taken to retain the estate's mature trees.

In 1957, Bilsby gave up his other business interests and committed his time to Priory Hall Ltd. The name "SPAN Developments" came into use in the early 1960s, deriving from the company's stated aim to "span the gap between the suburban monotony of the typical 'spec building' and the architecturally designed individually built residence".

In 1961, Danish landscape architect Preben Jacobsen (1934–2012) joined Lyons' practice.

=== Fieldend ===
The Fieldend development, at Strawberry Hill, London, was undertaken between 1959-60 and comprised 51 houses on a site previously used as a plant nursery. The houses were of T7 and T8 types. Landscaping was undertaken by Michael Brown. In 2020 the estate was listed at Grade II on the Register of Historic Parks and Gardens of Special Historic Interest in England.

=== Cedar Chase ===
24 houses of type C30, set on a sloping site in Taplow, South Buckinghamshire. Cedar Chase is one of the best-preserved examples of Span's work. It was controversial when built, but is explicitly included in the Taplow Village Conservation Area "because of the high quality of its design and the way it blends in with the landscape".

=== Marsham Lodge ===
Marsham Lodge, 25 houses in communal gardens in Gerrards Cross built in 1969, was one of the last developments to be completed under the Span Developments company name. Like Cedar Chase, Marsham Lodge uses only the C30 house design which was not used on any other development.

=== New Ash Green and after ===
The ambitious New Ash Green project, an entire village conceived by Span, dating from 1966, hit substantial financial difficulties, causing Lyons to withdraw and Bilsby and Townsend to resign. Townsend worked independently as a developer for several years thereafter. Bilsby and Townsend reunited in the late 1970s and formed SPAN Environments Ltd, working once more with Lyons and Cunningham as consultant architects, with Gostling, the builder from New Ash Green, doing the construction. Together they constructed four further developments in Blackheath and New Mallard Place in Teddington. The latter was conceived before Lyons' death in 1980 and completed in 1984, by which time Townsend was in his early 70s.

== List of developments ==
List of Span developments
Name	Description	Location	Coords	Constructed	References
Parkleys	169 flats in 15 2-storey and 3-storey blocks, 6 shops	Ham, London	51.431537°N 0.305096°W	1954–1955	
The Priory	61 flats	Blackheath	51.461384°N 0.012124°E	1956	
Park Gate	48 flats in two 4-storey L-shaped blocks	Hove	50.829216°N 0.158351°W	1956	
The Keep	44 houses (T2)	Blackheath	51.467369°N 0.016563°E	1957	
Hallgate	26 flats, Grade II listed	Blackheath	51.464396°N 0.015013°E	1957	
Highsett	31 flats, 6 duplexes, 17 T7/T8 houses, 31 R-type townhouses. Grade II listed	Cambridge	52.195791°N 0.132301°E	1959–1964	
Fieldend	51 houses	Strawberry Hill, London	51.433107°N 0.335481°W	1960	
3-35 South Row	33 flats	Blackheath	51.4695°N 0.012°E	1963	
Templemere	65 houses	Oatlands	51.376269°N 0.437991°W	1963	
Verney Close & The Verneys	Residential Housing	Cheltenham		1961–1963	
Weymede	141 houses	Byfleet	51.341630°N 0.468517°W	1963–1966	
The Lane	39 terraced houses	Blackheath	51.465029°N 0.019342°E	1964	
Cedar Chase	24 houses (C30) in 5 blocks	Taplow	51.53112°N 0.69045°W	1964–1966	
Lakeside	nineteen 3-storey town houses	Weybridge	51.380904°N 0.431609°W	1965	
Castle Green	22 houses	Oatlands	51.374307°N 0.435010°E	1965	
Marsham Lodge	25 houses	Gerrards Cross	51.584731°N 0.551408°W	1969	
New Ash Green	Village	Sevenoaks	51.370°N 0.3034°E	1967–1971	
Mallard Place	120 properties	Teddington	51.436440°N 0.330213°W	1984	
The Paddox	24 properties	Oxford	51.7839°N 1.2697°W	1967	

== Bibliography ==
- Simms, Barbara (July 2012). Eric Lyons and Span. RIBA. ISBN 9781859462560.
- Strike, James (2005). The Spirit of Span Housing. Strike Print. ISBN 9780954982201.
