= John Leslie Barford =

English Uranian poet

- Born: 1886
- Died: 1937 (aged 50–51)
- Other names: Philebus (pseudonym)
- Occupation(s): Uranian poet, doctor
- Known for: privately printed works
- Notable work: Ladslove Lyrics, Young Things, Fantasies, Whimsies

John Leslie Barford (1886–1937) was an English Uranian poet who wrote under the pseudonym of Philebus.

According to Timothy D'Arch Smith, he was a doctor in the Merchant Navy. His works, which were privately printed, include Ladslove Lyrics (1918), Young Things (1921), Fantasies (1923) and Whimsies (1934).
