= Uranian (sexuality) =

Historical term for gay men

Uranian (from the Ancient Greek Aphrodite Urania (Ἀφροδίτη Οὐρανία, Aphrodítē Ouranía)) is a historical term for homosexual men. The word was also used as an adjective in association with male homosexuality or inter-male attraction regardless of sexual orientation.

An early use of the term appears in Friedrich Schiller's 'Sixth Letter' in the Aesthetic Education of Man (1795–96). Schiller claims that state institutions are so jealous they would rather share their servants with a Cytherean Venus than a Uranian Venus. The term was used by activist Karl Heinrich Ulrichs, who referred to it in the German translation "Urning", in a series of five booklets from 1864 to 1865 collected under the title Forschungen über das Räthsel der mannmännlichen Liebe (The Riddle of Man–Manly Love). The term uranian was adopted by English-language advocates of homosexual emancipation in the Victorian era, such as Edward Carpenter and John Addington Symonds, who used it to describe a comradely love that would bring about true democracy. Oscar Wilde once wrote to his lover Robert Ross in an undated letter, "To have altered my life would have been to have admitted that uranian love is ignoble. I hold it to be noble—more noble than other forms."

Additionally, in his studies, Ulrichs notes that, whilst many Urnings felt as women did, others did not; with a number being otherwise quite manly despite their desires for men. Furthermore, of notability among some with variant gender identities, Ulrichs lists some possessed qualities much more akin to the female sex — such as mannerisms, clothing preferences, voices, temperaments, dislike of vulgarity, and a liking for typically feminine things such as flowers. Some accounts of patients even show signs of what we today call gender dysphoria, with one individual being noted for their tendency to avoid viewing their naked body at all times along with being distressed at the sight of their beard hair; feeling alien in their body and speaking of how they view it, they state "this is not how I feel inside". As a rule, Ulrichs did also make it clear that not all effeminate men were Urnings and that one may be feminine for a variety of reasons.

The term Uranians also designates a group of writers who studied classics and wrote pederastic poetry from roughly the 1870s to the 1930s. The writings of this group came to be known by the phrase Uranian poetry. The art of Henry Scott Tuke and Wilhelm von Gloeden is also sometimes referred to as Uranian.

== Etymology ==
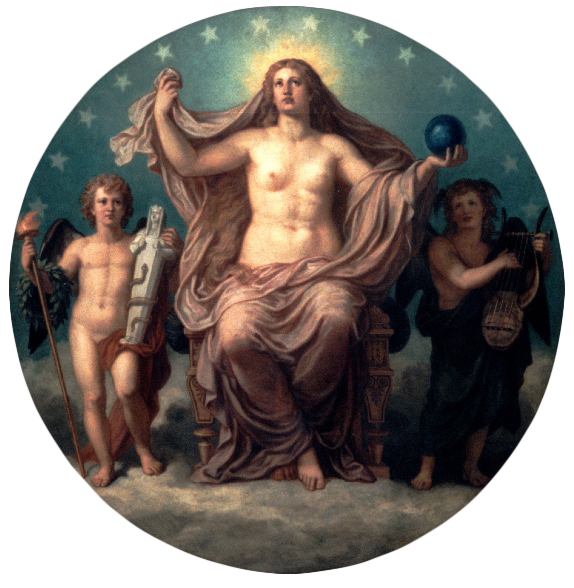
Aphrodite Urania, the goddess from whose name Ulrichs derived the term Urning for homosexual men

Ulrichs derived uranian (Urning in German) from a dialogue on eros, in particular male love, metaphorized by the birth of Greek goddess Aphrodite from Plato's work Symposium.

In this dialogue, Pausanias distinguishes between two types of love, symbolized by two different accounts of the birth of Aphrodite, the goddess of love. Urning was derived from Aphrodite Urania, who was created out of the god Uranus' semen, a birth in which "female has no part", therefore representing love between men. Its counterpart, dionian (Dioning in German), was derived from Aphrodite Dionea, the daughter of Zeus and Dione, associated with a common love which "is apt to be of women as well as of youths, and is of the body rather than of the soul", representing for Ulrichs men's love for women. Diverging from Plato's account of masculine love, Ulrichs understood male Urnings to be essentially feminine and male Dionings to be masculine in nature.

John Addington Symonds was one of the first to take up the term uranian in the English language and is also responsible for its connection with Ulrichs' Urning.

== See also ==
- Sapphism
- Emergence of the LGBT movement
- Sexual inversion (sexology)
