= Eric Lyons =

British designer and architect

- Lyons in 1961
- Born: Eric Alfred Lyons; 1912
- Died: 1980 (aged 67–68)
- Occupation: Architect

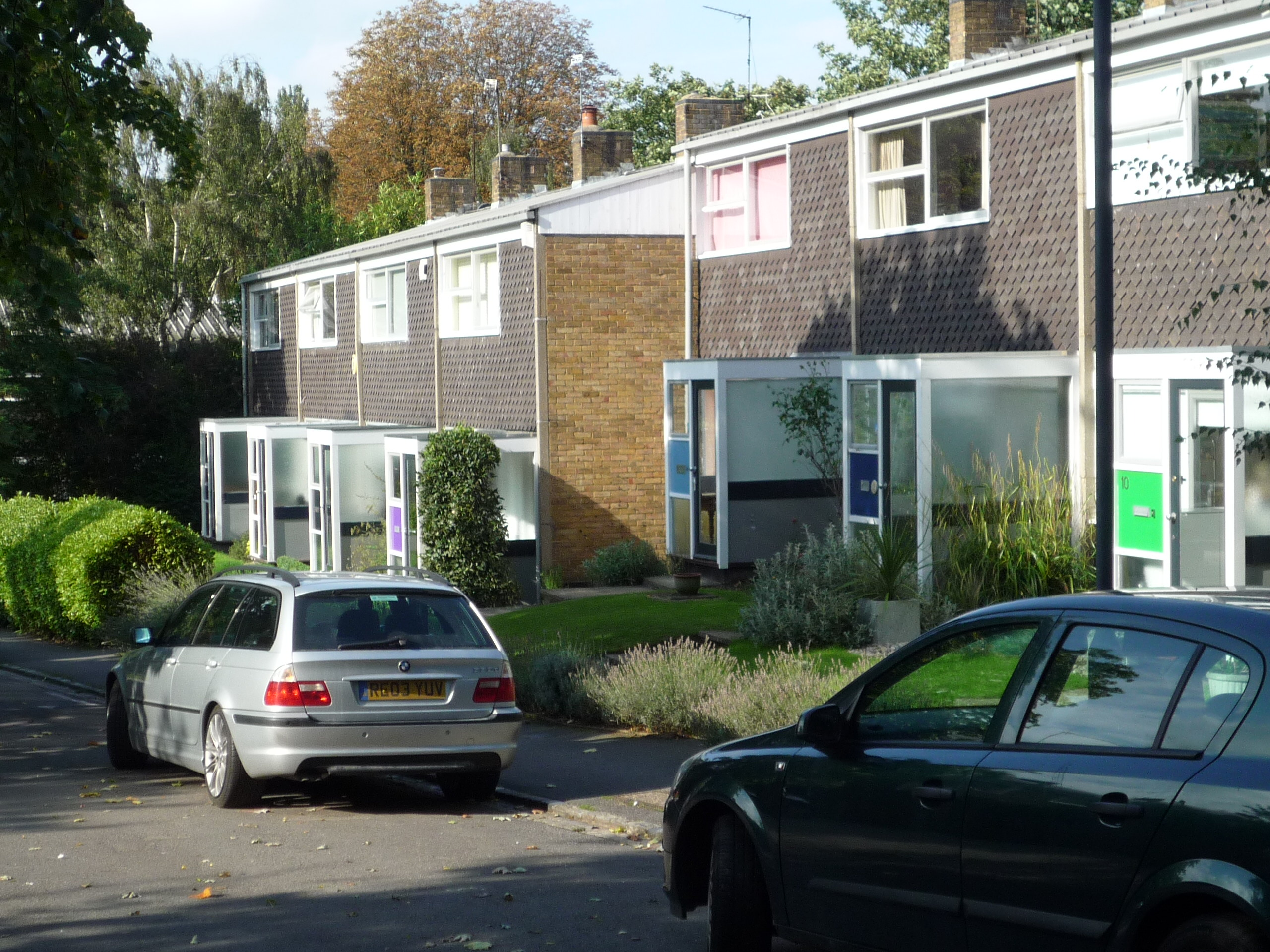
The Keep, Blackheath a typical set of houses to Eric Lyons' T2 design

Eric Alfred Lyons CBE (1912–1980) was a British designer and architect. He achieved critical recognition in his development of family and technology-embracing housing communities in England in the latter part of the 20th century. His partnership in Span Developments led to the building of over 73 estates, some of which have achieved Conservation area status in recognition of the close communities created with substantial garden areas, glass and light, façade angles used for privacy and decoration and separate garages as a practical Bauhaus for car-based culture and high point of Modern Architecture widely described a "successful, experimental modernism".

From 1936 to 1937 he worked for Walter Gropius and Maxwell Fry, in the short period that Gropius was in the UK. After World War II he spent a number of years working on various projects, designing flat-pack furniture for Tecta and entering competitions.

It was in 1948 that Span was founded, with Eric Lyons, Leslie Bilsby and Geoff Townsend who had resigned from the RIBA to become a developer (RIBA rules at the time prohibited architects from being developers).

Span estates were typified by sharp Modernist designs with space, light and well-planned interiors, tempered with traditional features such as hung tiles and stock brick. Lavishly landscaped communal gardens were also a common feature of Lyons' designs.

Outside of his Span work, he developed a number of other schemes, such as public housing for World's End in Chelsea, Pitcairn House (1961-63) as part of the LCC's Frampton Park Estate in Hackney, and his final development in Vilamoura, Portugal.

He was president of the RIBA from 1975 to 1977. He died in 1980 from motor neurone disease.
