= The Artist and Journal of Home Culture =

The Artist
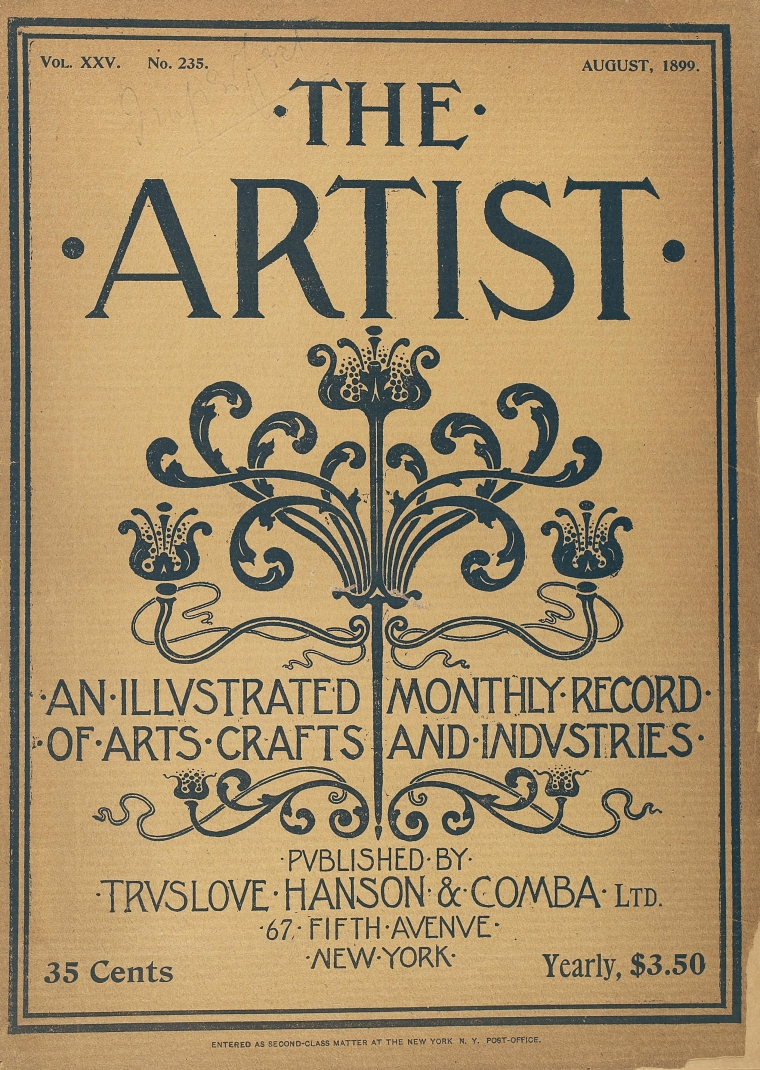
- Discipline: fine arts, applied arts
- Language: English

Publication details
- History: 1880–1902
- Publisher: Archibald Constable & Co. (English edition); Truslove, Hanson & Comba (American edition)
- Frequency: Monthly

Standard abbreviations
- ISO 4: Artist

Indexing
- ISSN: 2151-4879
- LCCN: 2010-234721
- JSTOR: 21514879
- OCLC no.: 503359263

The Artist and Journal of Home Culture, also The Artist, was a monthly art and design journal published in London by Archibald Constable & Co. from 1880 to 1902. From 1881 to 1894 the full title was The Artist and Journal of Home Culture. From 1896 the full title became The Artist: An Illustrated Monthly Record of Arts, Crafts and Industries. An American edition was published in New York by Truslove, Hanson & Comba.

Under the editorship of Charles Kains Jackson, 1888–94, The Artist and Journal of Home Culture contained a notable undercurrent of homoeroticism and had some importance in the homosexual subculture without being so overt as to alienate its mainstream readership. Described by scholar Thomas Waugh as a "closet pedophile" publication, it featured Uranian poetry and photographs of boys by Wilhelm von Gloeden.

== Editors ==
Editor's name	Years
Wallace L. Crowdy	1882–1884
Charles Kains Jackson	1888–1894
Wallace L. Crowdy	1894–1899
