= George Cecil Ives =

English gay rights advocate (1867–1950)

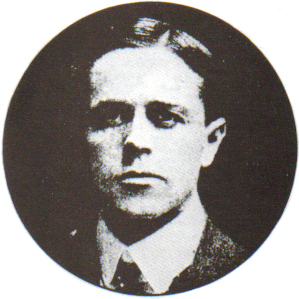
- Ives, c. 1900
- Born: 1 October 1867; Frankfurt, Kingdom of Prussia
- Died: 4 June 1950 (aged 82); Hampstead, Middlesex, England
- Burial place: Bentworth, Hampshire, England; 51.158061°N 1.050134°W
- Education: Magdalene College, Cambridge
- Occupations: Poet, writer, cricketer, prison reform campaigner and gay rights campaigner
- Known for: Founder of the Order of Chaeronea
- Cricket career

Cricket information

Domestic team information
- Years: Team
- 1902: MCC

Career statistics
| Competition | First-class |
|---|---|
| Matches | 1 |
| Runs scored | 9 |
| Batting average | 4.50 |
| 100s/50s | 0/0 |
| Top score | 7 |
| Catches/stumpings | 0/– |
- Source: CricketArchive

George Cecil Ives (1 October 1867 – 4 June 1950) was an English poet, writer, penal reformer and early homosexual law reform campaigner. He was born in Frankfurt, as the illegitimate son of an English army officer. He was primarily raised by his paternal grandmother Emma Ives, a daughter of the 3rd Viscount Maynard. Ives met his birth mother only twice in his life.

== Life and career ==
=== Early life and family ===
Ives was born at Frankfurt, Kingdom of Prussia, in 1867, the illegitimate son of Gordon Maynard Ives (1837–1907), an English army officer, and Jane Violet Tyler (1846–1936). He was brought up by his paternal grandmother, Emma Ives, daughter of the 3rd Viscount Maynard, with whom he lived between Bentworth in Hampshire and Southern France. Ives met his birth mother only twice and had a fraught relationship with his father.

=== Education at Magdalene College and 45 volumes of scrapbooks ===
Ives was educated at home and at Magdalene College, Cambridge, where he started to amass 45 volumes of scrapbooks (between 1892 and 1949). These scrapbooks consist of clippings on topics such as murders, punishments, freaks, theories of crime and punishment, transvestism, psychology of gender, homosexuality, cricket scores, and letters he wrote to newspapers.

=== Cricket player in the 1890s and 1900s ===
His interest in cricket led him to play a single first-class cricket match for the Marylebone Cricket Club in 1902. He also played cricket with teams of fellow-writers, including J. M. Barrie's Allahakbarries team and the Authors Cricket Club. In the 1890s, he captained a team representing the Authors' Club, and his team played three fixtures at Lord's Cricket Ground; but in 1899 he resigned from the club after overhearing members making violent and prejudiced comments about 'the homosexuals.'

Ives was a member of the Humanitarian League, a radical advocacy group, which operated between 1891 and 1919.

== Recruitment efforts ==
Ives met Oscar Wilde at the Authors' Club in London in 1892. Ives was already working for the end of the “oppression” of homosexuals, what he called "the Cause." He hoped that Wilde would join "the Cause", but was disappointed. In 1893, Lord Alfred Douglas, with whom he had a brief affair, introduced Ives to several other homosexual Oxford poets whom Ives also tried to recruit.

In 1897, Ives visited Edward Carpenter at Millthorpe. This marked the beginning of their friendship and political partnership.

== Hiring the Goddard family ==
In 1911 Ives was living at 196 Adelaide Road, London. He employed his life-long friend James Goddard (born 1868 Bentworth, Hampshire) as his valet. Goddard's wife and children were also employed by Ives during their lifetimes.

== Studies in sexual psychology, birth control, venereal disease, and prostitution ==
In 1914, Ives, together with Edward Carpenter, Magnus Hirschfeld, Laurence Housman and others, founded the British Society for the Study of Sex Psychology. He also kept in touch with other progressive psychologists such as Havelock Ellis and Professor Cesare Lombroso. The topics addressed by the Society in lectures and publications included: the promotion of the scientific study of sex and a more rational attitude towards sexual conduct; problems and questions connected with sexual psychology (from medical, juridical, and sociological aspects), birth control, abortion, sterilisation, venereal diseases, and all aspects of prostitution. In 1931, the organisation became the British Sexological Society. Ives was the archivist for the Society, whose papers were purchased by the Harry Ransom Center at the University of Texas at Austin (at which point they left the UK).

== Studies of European prisons and penal methods ==
Ives also visited prisons across Europe and specialised in the study of penal methods, particularly those of England. He lectured and published books on the topic.

== Death ==
He died in 1950, aged 82, in London. He was cremated at Golders Green Crematorium. He expressed a wish in his will that "No Jewish or Christian Texts or Emblems shall be placed on my tomb."

== The Ives papers ==
At his death in 1950, George Ives left a large archive covering his life and work between 1874 and 1949. The papers were bought in 1977 by the Harry Ransom Research Center at the University of Texas at Austin. They have been divided into four sections as follows:

=== I. Correspondence, 1874–1936 ===
This section contains invitations and letters regarding Ives' writings and lectures on prison reform, sodomy, the British Society for the Study of Sex Psychology, and other topics. Ives' correspondents include Adolf Brand, Oscar Browning, Edward Carpenter, Havelock Ellis, Norman Gale, Augustus Hare, Ernest Jones, Cesare Lombroso, Charlotte Maria North, Reggie Turner and Edvard Westermarck.

=== II. Works, 1897–1937 ===
This section groups examples of Ives' published works, lectures, notes and samples of verse, both as typescripts and holographs. The topics represented include: prison reform, crime and punishment, historical views of sexuality, religion.

=== III. Diaries, 1886–1949 ===
The bulk of the material consists of 122 volumes of diaries kept by Ives from the age of nineteen until about six months before his death at age eighty-two. Most of the diaries have daily entries for the period from 20 December 1886 to 16 November 1949. The view Ives provides in his diary of the life of an upper-middle class English homosexual from the end of the nineteenth century to the mid-twentieth century is of particular interest for understanding the homosexual movement in England during this time. The content varies from descriptive impressions of social events to detailed examinations of his friends and acquaintances, analyses of the treatment of criminals, and the workings of prisons. From volume thirteen on, Ives indexed his diaries, and he often used them when he was preparing for a lecture or other writings.

=== IV. Miscellaneous, 1888–1949 ===
This section includes the rules and wax seal impressions for the Order of Chaeronea, along with a library catalogue for the British Society for the Study of Sex Psychology, and a scrapbook of reviews and loose clippings for three of Ives' books, Eros' Throne (1900), A History of Penal Methods (1914), and Obstacles to Human Progress (1939). There is also a galley proof of George Bernard Shaw's preface to English Prisons Today (1922), prior to alterations.

== Raffles ==
He was the model for Raffles, the fictional Victorian gentleman thief, according to Andrew Lycett. Lycett says that the creator of Raffles, E. W. Hornung, "may not have understood this sexual side of Ives' character", but that Raffles "enjoys a remarkably intimate relationship with his sidekick Bunny Manders."

== Order of Chaeronea ==
In the autumn of 1893, Ives founded a secret male homosexual society named the Order of Chaeronea, after the Battle of Chaeronea where the male lovers of the Sacred Band of Thebes were killed in 338 BC. The Order of Chaeronea's "rules of purpose" stated that it was "A theory of life," although its purpose was mostly political. Most of the members were gay men, though some lesbian women were members as well.

The "service of Initiation" for the Order of Chaeronea still survives and contains the "Vow that shall make you one of our number":

That you will never vex or persecute lovers.
That all real love shall be to you as a sanctuary.
That all heart-love, legal and illegal, wise and unwise, happy and disastrous, shall yet be consecrate for that love's Holy Presence dwelt there.

It is unknown exactly how many people were a part of the Order of Chaeronea, as no membership lists survive and the members most likely referred to each other by initials, if at all. However, at the Order's peak, it most likely had two or three hundred members. Secrecy was paramount to the order, with new members being told, "Thou art forbidden to mention who belongs to anybody outside it." According to Ives, the purpose of the order was not for men to meet each other for sex, writing that sex "is forbidden on duty" and "All flames are pure." It is said that Oscar Wilde was an early recruit of the Order of Chaeronea; Ives wrote in his diary that "Oscar Wilde's influence will be considerable, I think."

== Bibliography ==
=== Verses ===
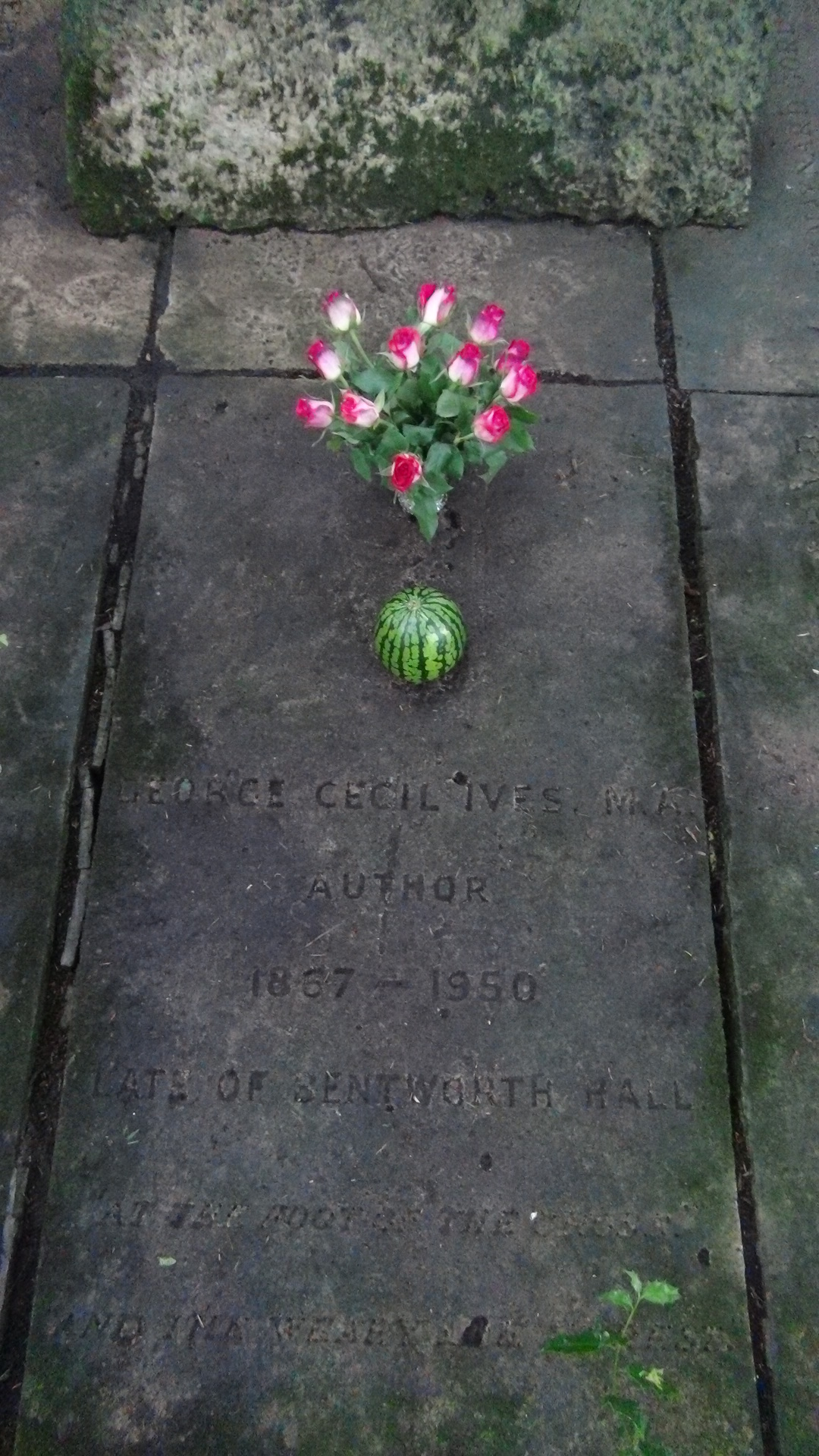
- George Ives' grave, Bentworth, Hampshire
  Book of Chains (1897)
- Eros' Throne (1900)

=== Non-fiction ===
- Penal Methods in the Middle Ages (1910)
- The Treatment of Crime (1912)
- A History of Penal Methods: Criminals, Witches, Lunatics (1914)
- The Sexes, Structure, & "Extra-organic" Habits of certain Animals (1918)
- The Continued Extension of the Criminal Law (1922)
- English Prisons Today (Prefaced by G.B. Shaw; 1922)
- Graeco-Roman View of Youth (1926)
- Obstacles to Human Progress (1939)
- The Plight of the Adolescent

=== Fiction ===
- The Missing Baronet (unpublished)

== Sources ==
- George Cecil Ives, Papers: 1874–1949 at the Harry Ransom Center at the University of Texas at Austin
- The Pink Plaque Guide to London, Michael Elliman and Frederick Roll, Gay Men's Press, 1986, ISBN 0-85449-026-4. p108
- A Queer A-Z of Hampshire, Dr Clifford Williams, Cuthbert Creme Books:Hampshire, 2019.
- Man Bites Man : the scrapbook of an Edwardian eccentric, George Ives, Paul Sieveking (ed.), J. Landesman: London, 1980.
