= List of alumni of Exeter College, Oxford =

This is a list of alumni of Exeter College, Oxford. Exeter is one of the colleges of the University of Oxford.

The scarcity of women in this list of notable alumni reflects the fact that for over six and a half centuries (from its foundation in 1314 until 1979), women were barred from studying at Exeter.

Those educated at the college include:

== Clergy ==
- James Aitken (1829–1908), clergyman and sportsman, competed in the Varsity cricket match three times and the 1849 Boat Race
- James Aitken (d 1687), Bishop of Galloway
- George John Blomfield (1822−1900), clergyman
- E. E. Bradford (1860–1944), priest and Uranian poet
- Thomas Bradley (1596/7–1673), priest
- Harold Davidson (1875–1937), Anglican priest
- Josh Levy, (1974- ), Reform Rabbi, CEO of Movement for Reform Judaism
- Charles Littlehales (1871–1945), cricketer and clergyman
- Benjamin Wills Newton (1807–1899), evangelist and theologian
- Jack Russell (1795–1883), priest and dog breeder
- Thomas Tregosse (c.1600–c.1670), Puritan minister
- Tom Wright (1948– ), Bishop of Durham

== Politicians ==
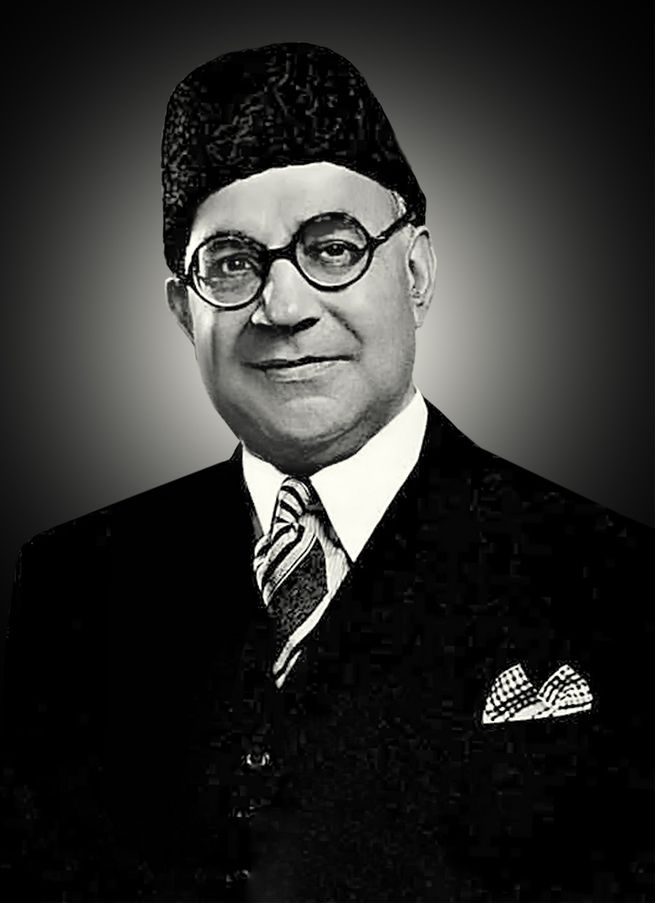
Liaquat Ali Khan

- Sir Hugh Acland, 5th Baronet (1639–1714), Member of Parliament
- Anthony Ashley-Cooper, 1st Earl of Shaftesbury (1621–1683), politician
- Dick Celeste (1937– ), 64th Governor of Ohio and US Ambassador to India
- Sir John Eliot (1592–1632), statesman
- Matt Hancock (1978– ), MP for West Suffolk since 2010
- Brad Hoylman (born 1965), New York State Senator
- Humayun Kabir (1906–1969), Education Minister of India
- Sirr Al-Khatim Al-Khalifa (1919–2006), Prime minister of the Sudan
- Liaquat Ali Khan (1896–1951), politician and the first Prime Minister of Pakistan
- Pedro Pablo Kuczynski (1938– ), former President of Peru
- John Kufuor (1938– ), President of Ghana
- John Maynard (1602–1690), 17th century lawyer and politician
- Patrick Mercer, Soldier and former Member of Parliament
- Chris Murphy (1973– ), United States Senator from Connecticut (Williams at Exeter programme)
- Sir Nicholas Slanning (1606–1643), Cornish MP and Civil War officer (royalist)
- Peter Truscott (1959– ), politician
- Claire Coutinho (1985- ), MP for East Surrey and Shadow Secretary of State for Energy Security and Net Zero

== Jurisprudence ==
- Charles Arthur Turner (1833–1907), Jurist, Chief Justice of Madras High Court
- Herbert Edmund-Davies (1906–1992), judge
- David Feldman, Emeritus Rouse Ball Professor of English Law at the University of Cambridge and former judge of the Constitutional Court of Bosnia and Herzegovina
- John Fortescue (c.1394–c.1480), jurist
- Kenneth Hayne (1945– ), judge of the High Court of Australia
- J. C. H. James (1841–1899), public servant and magistrate of Western Australia
- Sydney Kentridge (1922– ), barrister and judge
- Sir John Laws (1945–2020), Lord Justice of Appeal and constitutional theorist
- William Noy (1577–1634), lawyer and Attorney General to Charles I
- Julius Stone (1907–1985), legal theorist
- Noel Gratiaen (1904-1973), Attorney General and Supreme court Justice of Ceylon
- Murray Tobias (1939– ), judge of the New South Wales Court of Appeal
- Aarif Barma (1959– ), judge of the Court of Appeal of Hong Kong

== Other public offices ==
- Malcolm Patrick Murray (1905–1979), British civil servant
- Sir Oswyn Alexander Ruthven Murray (1873–1936), Permanent Secretary to the Admiralty, 1917–1936
- Sir Robert Mark Russell (1929–2005), British Diplomat
- Major Thomas Close Smith (1878–1946), High Sheriff of Buckinghamshire, 1942
- David Warren, diplomat
- Neerav Patel (1984– ), diplomat and current British Ambassador to Qatar

== Academics ==
- C. H. S. Fifoot (1899–1975), legal scholar
- Ian Maddieson (1942– ), phonetician
- Michael O'Neill (1953– ), academic
- Joseph Nye (1937– ), political scientist
- Surya Subedi (1958– ), international law scholar, barrister, Membre Titulaire of the Institut de Droit International
- Magdi Wahba (1925–1991), Egyptian academic, Lexicographer
- Robert J.C. Young (1950– ), FBA, Julius Silver Professor of English and Comparative Literature, New York University
- Qian Zhongshu (1910–1998), Chinese literary scholar

=== Science and medicine ===
- John Lane Bell (1945– ), mathematician and philosopher
- Norman Bleehen (1930–2008), oncologist
- Sydney Brenner (1927– ), 2002 Nobel Laureate in the category "physiology or medicine"
- Richard Chorley (1927–2002), geographer
- Edgar F. Codd (1923–2003), inventor of the Relational Database
- Michael Efroimsky (1962– ), astronomer
- E. E. Evans-Pritchard (1902–1973), social anthropologist
- Malachy Hitchins (1741–1809 ), astronomer and mathematician
- Charles Lyell (1797–1875), geologist
- Brian John Marples (1907–1997), zoologist
- John E. M. Midgley (1935–2023), British biochemist
- Arthur Peacocke (1924–2006), biochemist and theologian
- Paul Seymour (1950– ), mathematician

=== Historians ===
- Correlli Barnett (1927–2022), military historian
- Peter Brock (1920–2006), historian
- Robin Bush (1943–2010), Time Team historian
- Rev Nicolas Tindal (1687–1774), historian
- Francis Turville-Petre (1901–1941), archaeologist and excavator of the Galilee Man
- Pe Maung Tin (1888-1973), historian and linguist

=== Philosophers ===
- John Gray (1948– ), London School of Economics philosopher
- Christopher Peacocke (1950– ), philosopher

== Artists, composers, writers and entertainers ==
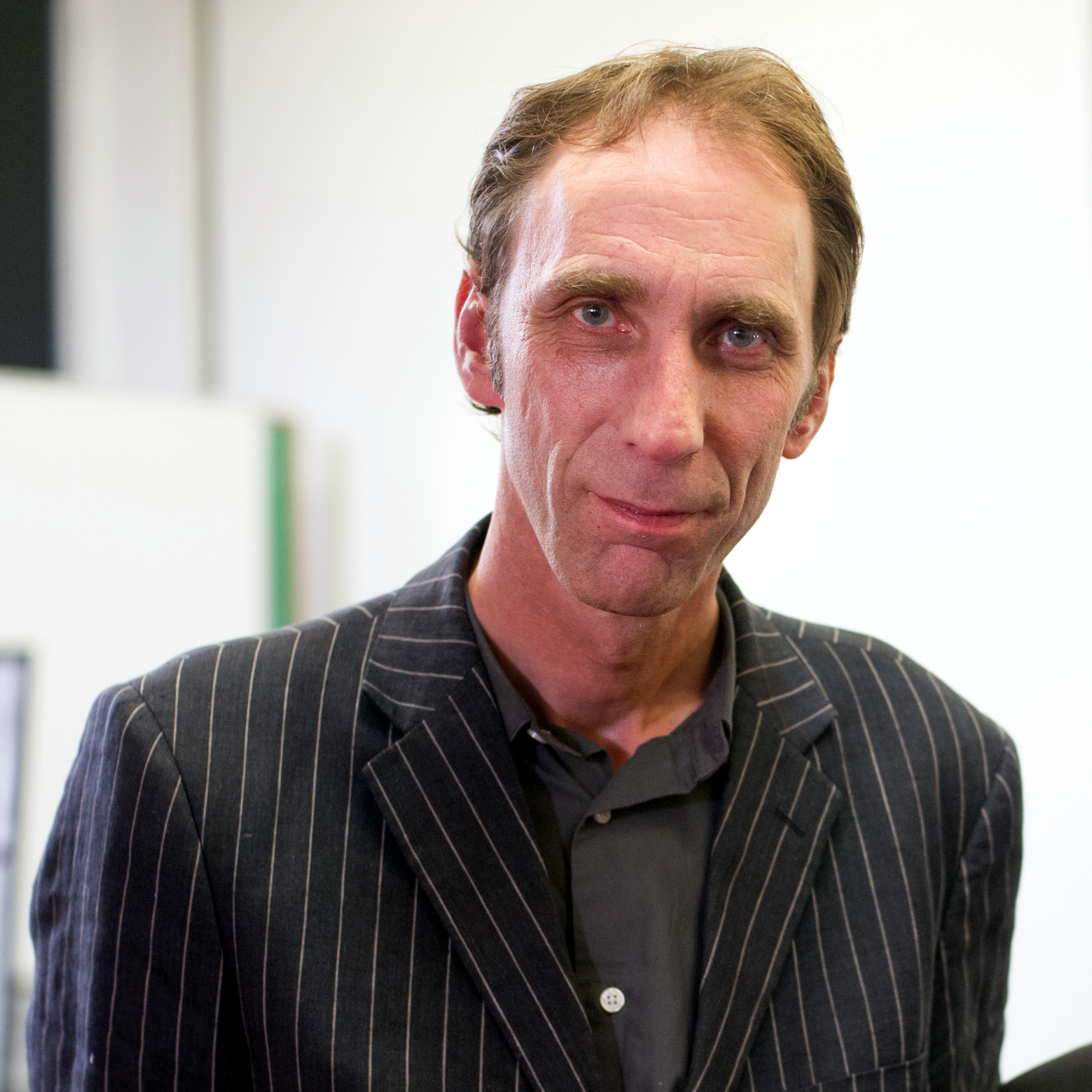
Will Self

- Tariq Ali (1943– ), writer and filmmaker
- Martin Amis (1949–2023), novelist
- Alan Bennett (1934– ), author and actor
- R. D. Blackmore (1825–1900), author of Lorna Doone
- Edward Burne-Jones (1833–1898), artist
- Richard Burton (1925–1984), actor
- S.E. Cottam, poet, priest and publisher
- John Ford (1586–c.1640?), dramatist
- John Gardner (1917–2011), composer
- James Hamilton-Paterson, novelist and poet
- Christopher Herrick, organist
- Mark Labbett (1965– ), Quiz player
- Lady Flora McDonnell (1963– ), children's author
- William Morris (1834–1896), writer, designer and socialist
- Alfred Noyes (1880–1958), poet
- Francis Turner Palgrave (1824–1897), critic and poet
- Sir Charles Hubert Hastings Parry (1848–1918), composer
- Philip Pullman (1946– ), author of His Dark Materials
- Paul William Roberts (1950–2019), novelist, journalist, travel writer, Middle East expert
- Amy Sackville (1981– ), novelist
- Will Self (1961– ), novelist
- Imogen Stubbs (1961– ), actress
- Richard Tanner, organist
- J. R. R. Tolkien (1892–1973), author of The Hobbit and The Lord of the Rings
- Paul Wheeler (writer), (1934-), author of Bodyline: The Novel
- Helen Marten (1985– ), artist and winner of the Hepworth Prize and Turner Prize in 2016.

== Sportsmen ==
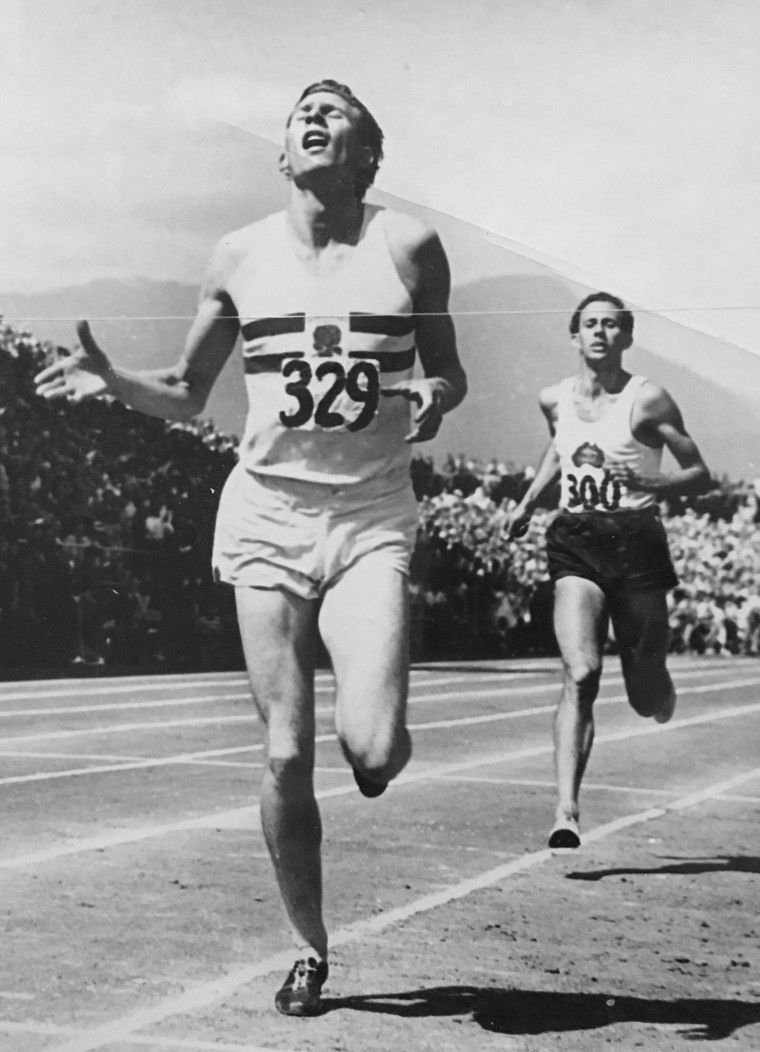
Roger Bannister

- Roger Bannister (1929–2018), athlete
- John Knapp (1841–1881), cricketer
- Jack Lovelock (1910–1949), athlete
- William Moore (1890–1956) , Olympic athlete
- Claude Wilson (1858–1881), footballer

== Media ==
- Raymond Raikes (1910-1999), Broadcaster, Radio director & producer
- Roger Alton (1947– ), journalist and newspaper editor
- Sanchia Berg (1964– ), BBC correspondent
- Reeta Chakrabarti (1964– ), BBC correspondent
- Russell Harty (1934–1988), television presenter
- Michael Imison (1935– ), BBC television director, story editor and literary agent
- Boisfeuillet Jones, Jr. (1946– ), media executive and former newspaper publisher
- Robert Moore (1963– ), ITV News correspondent
- Robert Robinson (1927–2011), radio and television presenter
- Ned Sherrin (1931–2007), broadcaster, author and stage director
- Wynford Vaughan-Thomas (1908–1987), broadcaster
- Richard Simons (1952-)News Editor ITN, Director of Programmes Meridian Broadcaating

== Other alumni ==
- Mark Allen (1950– ), businessman and former British spy
- Sir Ronald Cohen (1945– ), businessman
- Dominic Cummings (1971– ), campaign director of Vote Leave and chief adviser to British Prime Minister Boris Johnson
- David Michael Webb (1965–2026), activist shareholder, corporate and economic governance activist

== See also ==
- List of rectors of Exeter College, Oxford
