= Oswyn Murray =

British classical scholar (born 1937)

Oswyn Murray FSA
- Born: March 26, 1937 (age 89)
- Occupation: Classical scholar
- Notable credit: Co-editor of the Oxford History of the Classical World
- Children: 5, including Tavi Murray
- Father: Malcolm Patrick Murray
- Relatives: James Augustus Henry Murray (great-grandfather)

Oswyn Murray FSA (born 26 March 1937) is a Fellow of Balliol College, Oxford University, and a distinguished classical scholar.

Murray is joint editor with John Boardman and Jasper Griffin of the Oxford History of the Classical World.

Boris Johnson was one of his students when he was reading Classics at Balliol College. He describes Johnson as "a buffoon and an idler". In 2018, when Johnson became prime minister, Murray sent his former student, in the ancient tradition, a renuntiatio amicitiae, a public revocation of their friendship.

== Family ==
Oswyn Murray is a great-grandson of the famous Scottish lexicographer James Augustus Henry Murray. He is the son of the civil servant Malcolm Patrick Murray. He married Jenny E. Clay in Oxford in 1959. He married Penelope A. Singleton in Banbury in 1976. He has five children: James A. H. Murray (born 1961), the glaciologist Tavi Murray (born 1965), Alexander Edmund Murray (born 1976), Malcolm Patrick Murray (born 1980), and Rosamund Jean Murray (born 1982).

== Selected publications ==
- Sympotica: A symposium on the symposion. Oxford: Oxford University Press, 1990. (Ed.) ISBN 0198150040
- Early Greece. Harvard University Press, 1993 (2nd edition). ISBN 067422132X
- The Muse of History: The Ancient Greeks from the Enlightenment to the Present. Allen Lane, 2024. ISBN 9780241360576
