= Freeman Thomas (disambiguation) =

Freeman Thomas, car designer.

== Similar name ==
- Freeman Thomas (cricketer, born 1838), father of
- Freeman Freeman-Thomas, 1st Marquess of Willingdon, British politician and Viceroy of India
- Marie Freeman-Thomas, Marchioness of Willingdon
