= Thomas Phinn =

British barrister and Liberal Party politician

Thomas Phinn QC
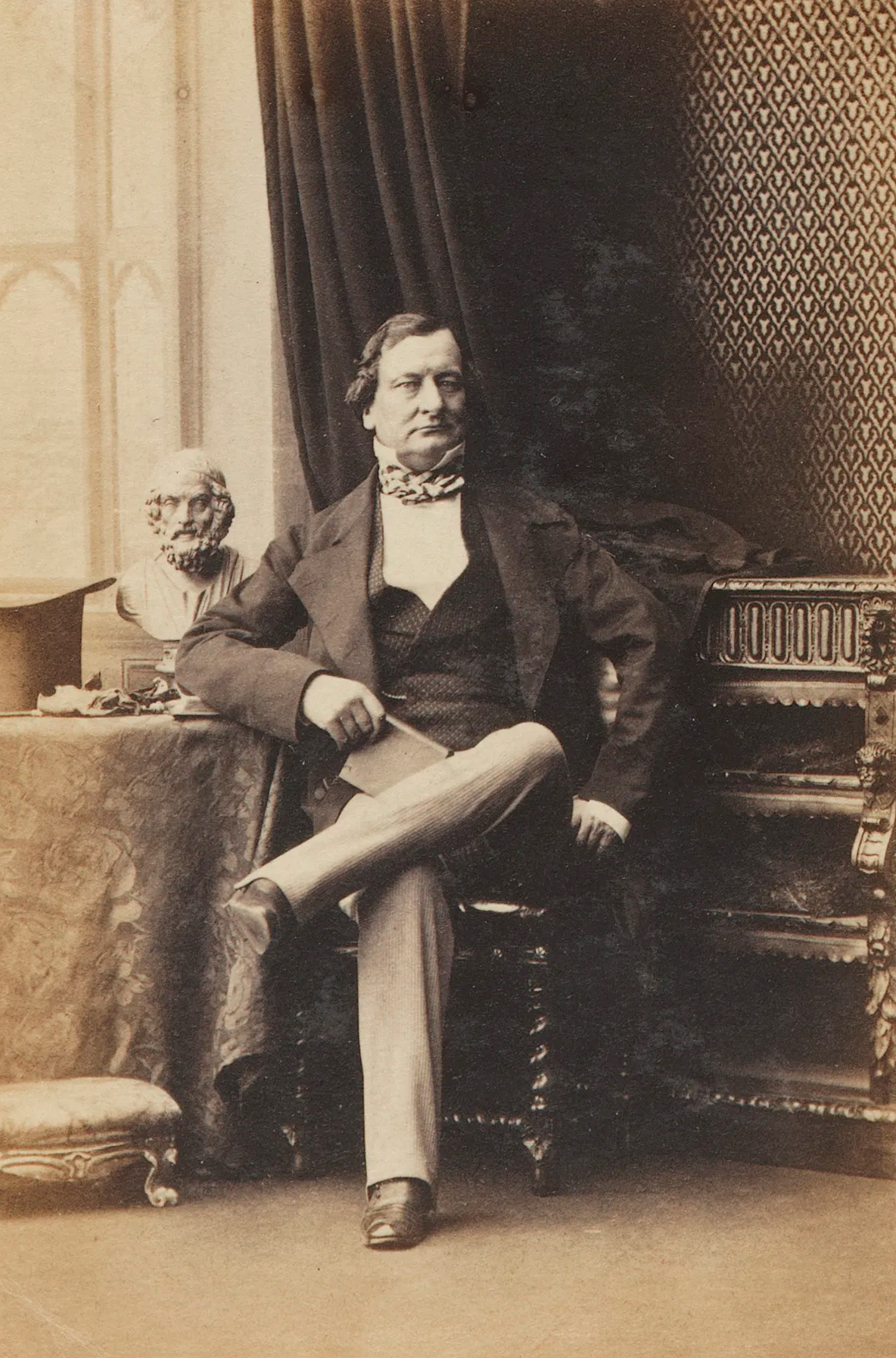
- Portrait by Camille Silvy, 1860

Second Secretary to the Admiralty
- In office 22 May 1855 – 7 May 1857
- Preceded by: William Baillie-Hamilton
- Succeeded by: William Govett Romaine

Personal details
- Born: Unknown date, c. 1814 Bath, Somerset, England
- Died: 31 October 1866 (aged 51–52) London, Middlesex, England
- Party: Liberal Party
- Education: Eton College; Exeter College
- Occupation: Barrister

Thomas Phinn, QC (c. 1814 – 31 October 1866) was a British barrister and Liberal Party politician. He held various positions in the Admiralty of the United Kingdom in the mid-19th century.

== Life ==
Born in Bath, Somerset, Phinn was educated at Eton College and Exeter College, Oxford. He read for the bar at the Inner Temple, being called in 1840. He was elected at the 1852 general election as Member of Parliament for Bath, but held that seat for only three years, until 1855.

He was appointed Counsel to the Admiralty and Judge Advocate of the Fleet on 17 April 1854, and continued in that office until appointed Second Secretary to the Admiralty on 22 May 1855, He was made a Queen's Counsel in 1857.

a post which required his resignation from the House of Commons. He resigned from the Admiralty on 7 May 1857, but was re-appointed Counsel and Judge-Advocate on 12 November 1863, and held that post until his death on 31 October 1866, in London.

Parliament of the United Kingdom
Preceded by Viscount Duncan; George Scobell	Member of Parliament for Bath; 1852–1855; With: George Scobell	Succeeded by William Tite; George Scobell
Legal offices
Preceded by Richard Budden Crowder	Judge Advocate of the Fleet; 1854–1855	Succeeded by William Atherton
Preceded by Robert Porrett Collier	Judge Advocate of the Fleet; 1863–1866	Succeeded by John Walter Huddleston
Government offices
Preceded by William Baillie-Hamilton	Second Secretary to the Admiralty; 1855–1857	Succeeded by William Govett Romaine
