= Inigo Thomas =

Inigo Thomas may refer to:

- Inigo Thomas (civil servant) (1846–1929), English civil servant
- Inigo Thomas (garden designer) (1865–1950), English artist and garden designer
