= Littlehales =

Littlehales is a surname. Notable people with the surname include:

- Alf Littlehales (1867–1942), British footballer
- Charles Littlehales (1871–1945), British cricketer
- Dylan Littlehales (born 1999), Australian paracanoeist
- George W. Littlehales (1860-1943), American naval officer
- Harry Littlehales (1901–1989), British footballer
- Richard Littlehales (born 1931-2014), British florist by Royal appointment
