= Henry Vaughan Markham =

British civil servant

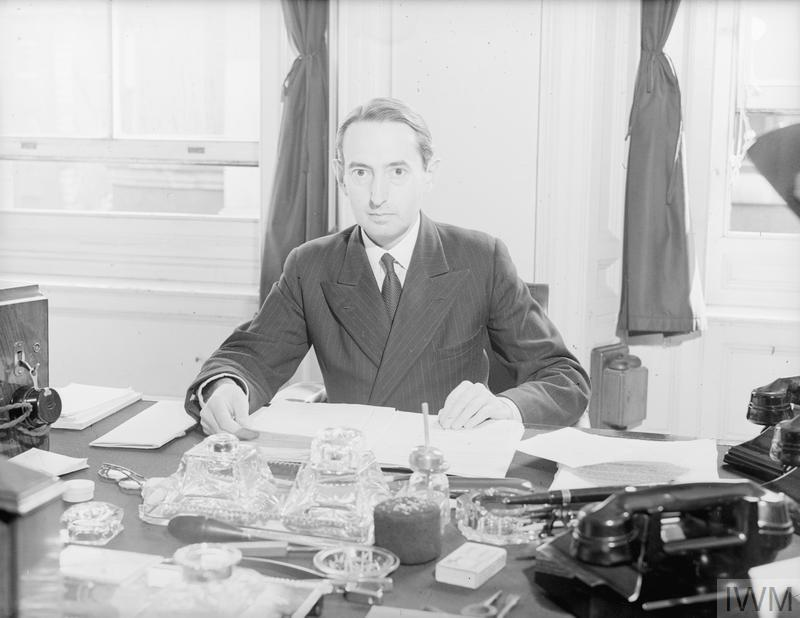
Markham at his desk in 1943

Sir Henry Vaughan Markham KBE MC (4 February 1897 – 14 December 1946) was a British civil servant who held the position of Permanent Secretary of the Admiralty from 1940 to 1946.

== Family and education ==
Markham was born in Sleaford, Lincolnshire, to John Markham, a bank manager for the Lincoln & Lindsey Bank, and his wife Elizabeth.

He was educated at Colet House school in Rhyl and Corpus Christi College, Oxford.

== Career ==
During the First World War, Markham served with the Royal Garrison Artillery on the Western Front and was awarded the Military Cross.

He entered the British Civil Service in 1921, joining the Admiralty. From 1936 to 1938 he served as Principal Private Secretary to successive First Lords of the Admiralty, Samuel Hoare (1936–1937) and Duff Cooper (1937–1938).

In December 1940 Markham replaced Sir Archibald Carter as Permanent Secretary of the Admiralty, a position he held throughout the Second World War and until he was compelled to step back from his duties in October 1946 owing to ill health.

He died at Margate on 14 December 1946, aged 49. Tributes were paid in the House of Commons, including by the Parliamentary and Financial Secretary of the Admiralty, John Dugdale, who praised Markham's “outstanding ability and devotion during five of the most strenuous years in the history of the Navy. It would be difficult, I think, to find a more brilliant, fair-minded or charming civil servant. His death, at the early age of 49, has been a blow not only to the Admiralty, but to the entire Civil Service, and one which I, personally, have felt very keenly”.

== Honours ==
Markham was awarded the Military Cross (MC) in 1919 and was made a Knight Commander of the Order of the Bath (KCB) in 1941.

Government offices
Preceded by Sir Archibald Carter	Permanent Secretary of the Admiralty; 1940–1946	Succeeded by Sir John Lang
