= Permanent Secretary to the Admiralty =

Office of the UK Royal Navy

United Kingdom Office of the Permanent Secretary of the Admiralty
- Royal Arms as used by Her Majesty's Government

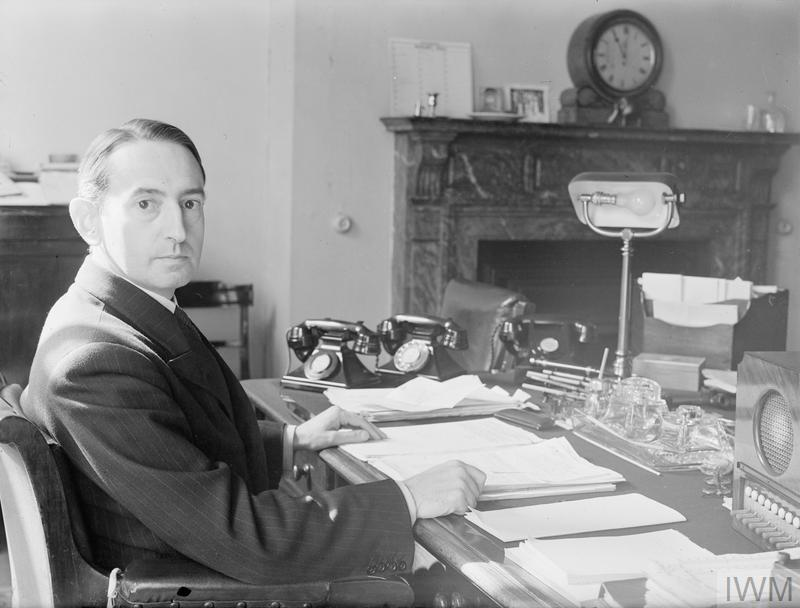
- Sir Henry V. Markham, Permanent Secretary, 1940–1946
- Admiralty Department
- Style: The Right Honourable (Formal prefix); Second Secretary to the Admiralty
- Member of: British Cabinet; Board of Admiralty
- Seat: Westminster, London
- Appointer: The British Monarch on advice of the Prime Minister
- Term length: No fixed term
- Formation: 1702–1964
- First holder: George Clarke
- Final holder: Clifford Jarrett

The Permanent Secretary of the Admiralty was the permanent secretary at the Admiralty, the department of state in Great Britain and subsequently the United Kingdom responsible for the administration of the Royal Navy. He was head of the Admiralty Secretariat, later known as the Department of the Permanent Secretary. Although he was not a Lord Commissioner of the Admiralty, he was as a member of the Board, and did attend all meetings. The post existed from 1702 to 1964.

== History ==
The office originally evolved from the Assistants to the Secretary of the Admiralty (later called the First Secretary) who were initially only intermittently appointed, being sometimes designated "joint secretary" and sometimes "deputy secretary". Appointments became regular from 1756, and the title of the office was established as Second Secretary to the Admiralty on 13 January 1783. In the 19th century, it increasingly became the case that the First Secretary of the Admiralty was a member of the Government, while the Second Secretary was a civil servant, and the titles of the offices were changed to reflect this in 1869, the First Secretary becoming the Parliamentary Secretary of the Admiralty and the Second Secretary the Permanent Secretary of the Admiralty. When the Admiralty Department was abolished in 1964 and its functions merged within a new Ministry of Defence the post holder became formally known as the Permanent Under Secretary of State for the Navy.

== Duties ==
He was primarily responsible for the interrelationships and office organization of the various departments that serve the Royal Navy. He assumed the role Secretary to the Board, his chief responsibility was to examine thoroughly all questions involving expenditures and to advise the Board as to the possibility of savings where possible.

== Office-holders ==
=== Assistant Secretary ===
- George Clarke, joint secretary, 20 May 1702 to 25 October 1705.

=== Deputy Secretary ===
Included:

- John Fawler, 15 November 1705 to 11 November 1714
- Thomas Corbett, 25 June 1728 to 13 October 1742
- Robert Osborn, 17 November 1744 to 1 August 1746
- John Clevland, 4 August 1746 to 1 May 1751
- John Milnes, 15 June 1756 to 16 October 1759
- Philip Stephens, 16 October 1759 to 18 June 1763.
- Charles Fearne, 28 June 1764 to 10 November 1766.
- George Jackson, 11 November 1766 to 12 June 1782.
- John Ibbetson, from 12 June 1782 to 13 January 1783.

=== Second Secretary ===
Title established as Second Secretary in January 1783.

- John Ibbetson, from 31 January 1783
- William Marsden, from 3 March 1795
- Benjamin Tucker, from 21 January 1804
- John Barrow, from 22 May 1804
- Benjamin Tucker, from 10 February 1806
- Sir John Barrow, from 9 April 1807
- William Baillie-Hamilton, from 28 April 1845
- Thomas Phinn, from 22 May 1855
- William Govett Romaine, from 7 May 1857 to 19 June 1869

=== Permanent Secretary ===
In 1869 the office was renamed Permanent Secretary of the Admiralty.

- Vernon Lushington, from 1869 to 1877.

The office was abolished in 1877 and the duties merged with those of the Naval Secretary.

=== Naval Secretary ===
New post established in 1872.

- Rear-Admiral Robert Hall, from 1872 to 1882.

The post was abolished in 1882 when that of Permanent Secretary was re-established.

=== Permanent Secretary ===
- Robert George Crookshank Hamilton, from May 1882
- Vice-Admiral Robert Hall, acting during Hamilton's absence in Ireland, 1882
- Captain George Tryon, from 13 June 1882.
- Sir Evan Macgregor, from 2 April 1884
- Sir Inigo Thomas, from 1 April 1907
- Sir Graham Greene, 1911–1917
- Sir Oswyn Murray, 1917–1936
- Sir Richard Carter, 1936–1940
- Sir Henry Markham, 1940–1946
- Sir John Lang, 1947–1961
- Sir Clifford Jarrett, 1961–1964

== See also ==
- Parliamentary and Financial Secretary to the Admiralty
- Board of Admiralty
- Admiralty

== Sources ==
- Rodger, N. A. M. (1979). The Admiralty, Offices of State Series. Suffolk: Terence Dalton Ltd.
- "Permanent Secretary to the Board of Admiralty." The Dreadnought Project.
