= The Quorum (magazine) =

British magazine

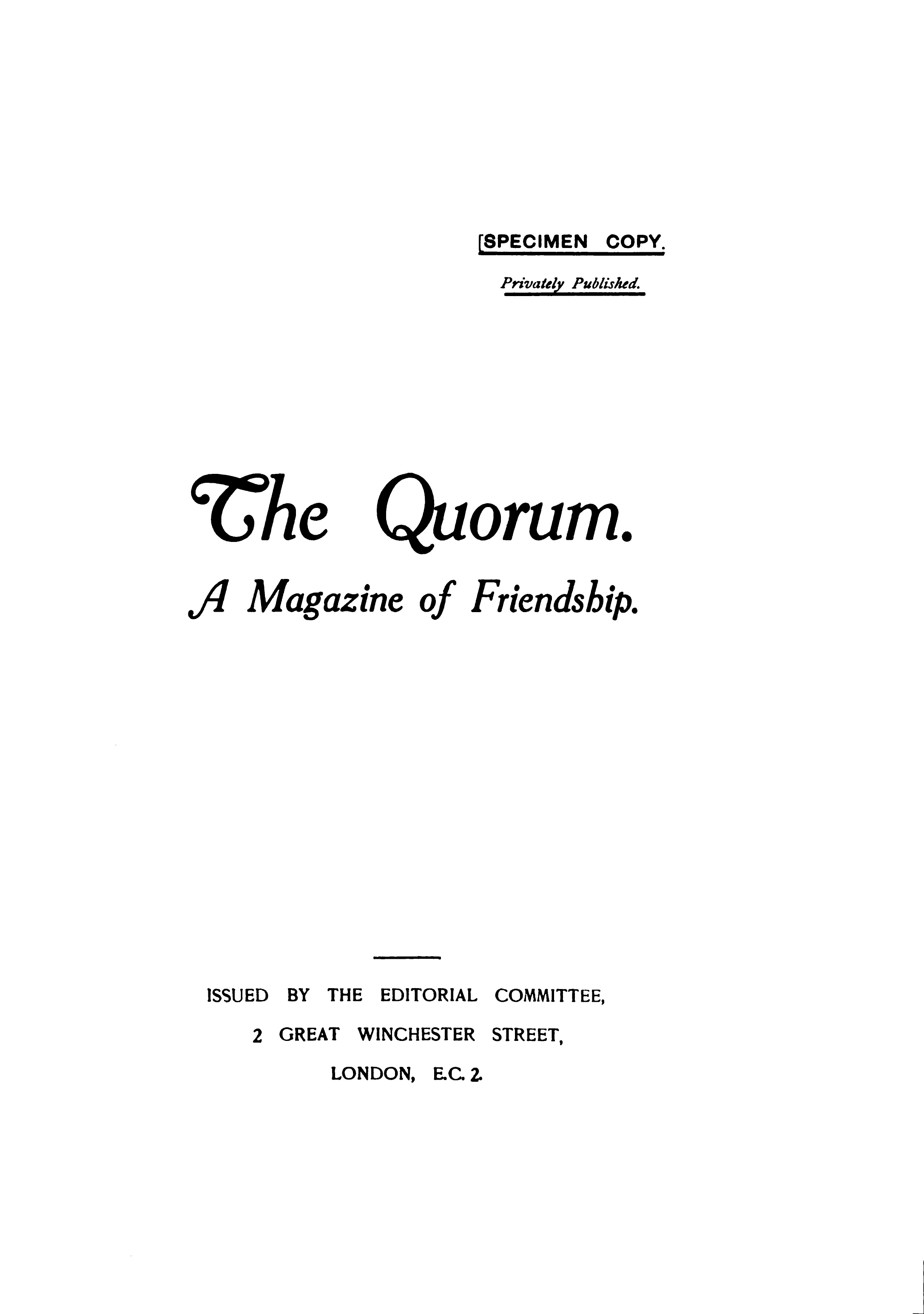
Frontpage "The Quorum" 1/1920

The Quorum. A Magazine of Friendship was the first British homosexual magazine, published in London in 1920 by "The Editorial Committee" of the British Society for the Study of Sex Psychology and the Order of Chaeronea. Arthur Lee Gardner probably acted as editor-in-chief. Only one issue of the journal appeared because George Cecil Ives, an influential member of both organizations, feared the publicity that would accompany a journal and urged Gardner to cease publication. The majority of the contributors were from the British homosexual movement; the best-known author was Dorothy L. Sayers, later famous for her detective novels, who contributed two poems, including a love poem called Veronica.

The magazine was distributed among members of the BSSSP only. Three copies of the edition are known to exist, one at the British Library, one at Cornell University, and one in the private collection of Raimondo Biffi. The latter copy served as source for an annotated facsimile, edited in 2001. Research on the history of The Quorum was done by Timothy d'Arch Smith in 1970 and 2001.

== Contents ==
- Page 5: Introduction
- Page 9: Friendship and Love by E. E. Bradford (poem)
- Page 10: Victorian Ethics and Neo-Georgian Romantics by Arthur Gardner (Rev. Arthur Lee Gardner) (article)
- Page 18: In Hospital by Leonard Green (story)
- Page 20: A Bubble by Leonard Green (story)
- Page 22: Veronica by Dorothy L. Sayers (poem)
- Page 23: Prayer to the Holy Ghost Against Triviality by Dorothy L. Sayers (poem)
- Page 24: Allegory by Kenneth Ingram (story)
- Page 28: Class Hatred by Kenneth Ingram (article)
- Page 34: Review by Arthur Gardner of "Prelude" by Beverley Nichols
- Page 38: Ad Amicum by J. G. Nicholson (poem)
