= William Tite =

English architect (1798–1873)

Sir William Tite CB FRS MP
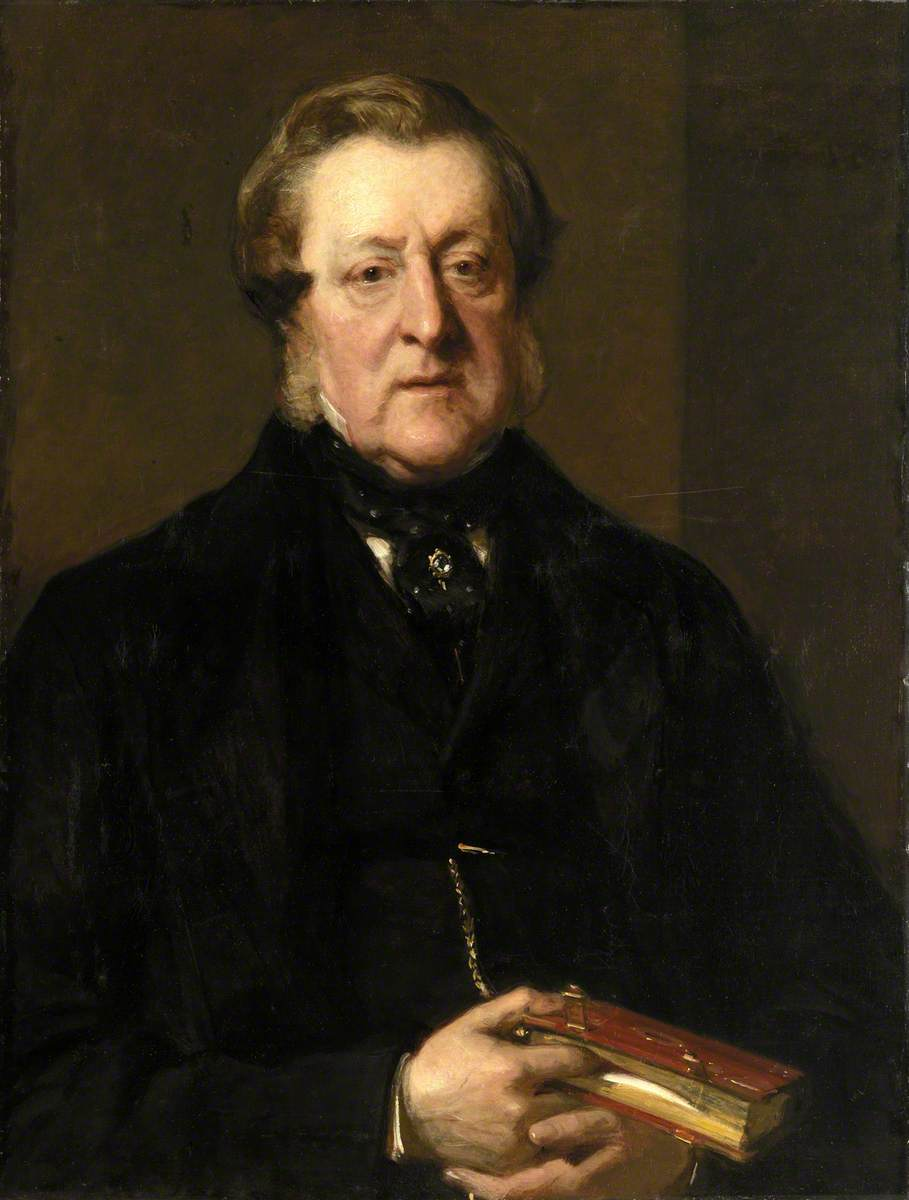
- William Tite, portrait c.1863

Member of Parliament for Bath
- In office 5 June 1855 – 20 April 1873
- Preceded by: Thomas Phinn
- Succeeded by: Viscount Chelsea

Personal details
- Born: 7 February 1798 City of London, England
- Died: 20 April 1873 (aged 75) Torquay, Devon, England
- Party: Liberal

Sir William Tite CB FRS (7 February 1798 – 20 April 1873) was an English architect who twice served as President of the Royal Institute of British Architects. He was particularly associated with various London buildings, with railway stations and cemetery projects. He was the Member of Parliament (MP) for Bath from 1855 until his death.

== Early life and career ==
Tite was born in the parish of St Bartholomew the Great in the City of London, in February 1798, the son of a merchant in Russian goods named Arthur Tite.

He was articled to David Laing, architect of the new Custom House, and surveyor to the Parish of St Dunstan-in-the-East. Tite assisted Laing in the rebuilding of St Dunstan's church: according to an article published in the Architect in 1869, Tite entirely designed the new building, Laing himself having no knowledge of Gothic architecture.

In 1827–8 Tite built the Scottish church in Regent Square, St Pancras, London, for Edward Irving, in a Gothic Revival style, partly inspired by York Minster, and ten years later collaborated with Charles Robert Cockerell in designing the London & Westminster Bank head office in Lothbury, also in the city.

== Royal Exchange ==
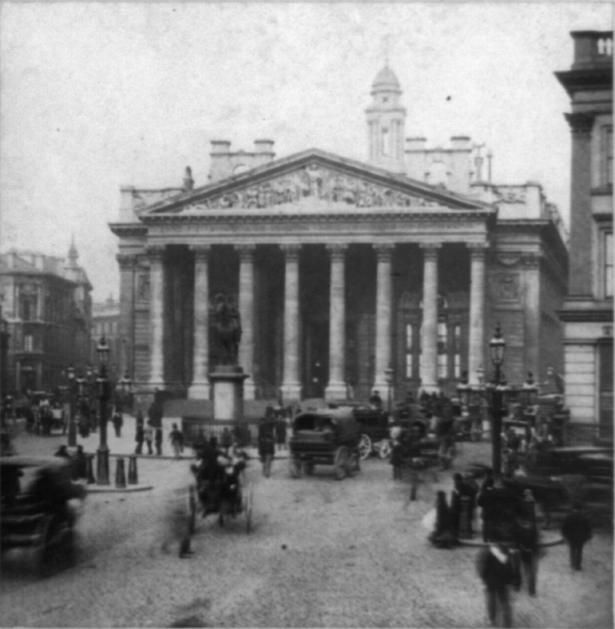
The Royal Exchange, c. 1855

The rebuilding of the Royal Exchange, opened in 1844, was Tite's greatest undertaking. The previous building was destroyed by fire in 1838, and a competition to design a replacement was held the following year. When this proved unproductive, a second limited competition was held between Tite, Charles Robert Cockerell, George Gwilt, Charles Barry and Robert Smirke. Tite's winning design has an imposing eight-column entrance portico, inspired by the Pantheon in Rome, while the other sides of the building are based on Italian renaissance models.

== Railway stations ==
Tite was the architect for the Eastern Counties, London and Blackwall, Gravesend and South Western Railways, and in France those between Paris and Rouen and Rouen and Le Havre; an article in the Architect named the station at Rouen, spanning nearly ninety feet, as an example of his structural skill. Tite designed many of the early railway stations in Britain, including:

- The termini of the London and South Western Railway at Vauxhall (Nine Elms), Southampton Terminus, Gosport and Windsor Riverside
- The termini of the London and Blackwall Railway at Minories and Blackwall (1840)
- Carnforth, Carlisle Citadel and Lancaster Castle railway stations (1846–1847)
- The majority of the stations on the Caledonian and Scottish Central railways, including Edinburgh (1847–1848) (not built) and Perth (1847–1848)
- Barnes, Barnes Bridge, Chiswick and Kew Bridge railway stations (1849)
- Stations between Yeovil and Exeter, including Axminster and the now-demolished Honiton.

His station at Carlisle was built in a neo-Tudor style with a frontage of about 400 feet, broken into several masses. At the centre of the façade was an arcade of five arches, with buttresses and pinnacles. The refreshment rooms had "an open timber roof, and oriels or bays, reminiscent of the dining-hall of olden times".

== Cemeteries ==
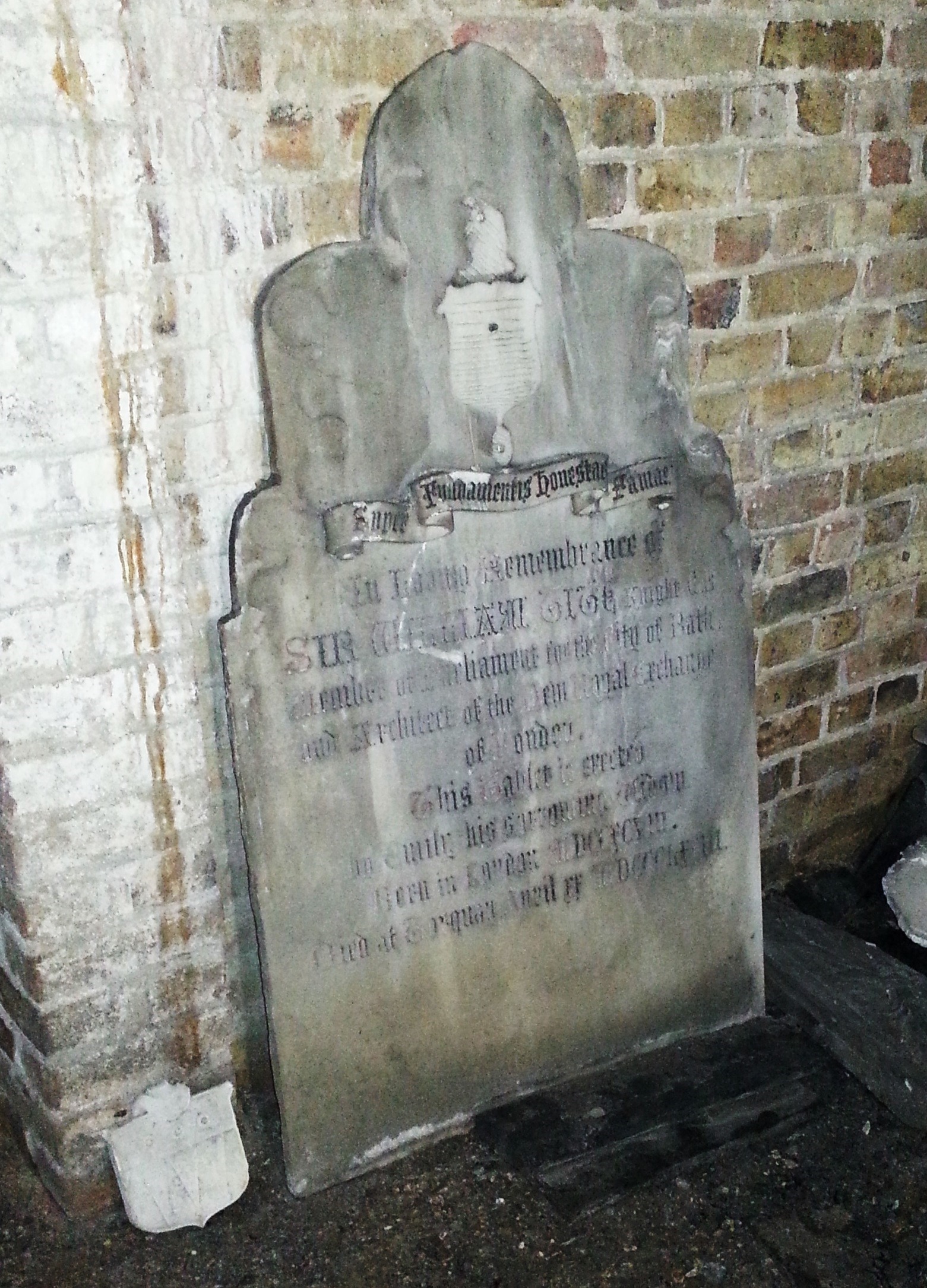
Headstone of William Tite at the Catacombs of West Norwood Cemetery July 2014

As a company director of the South Metropolitan Cemetery Company he laid out his first cemetery at Norwood in 1836 and designed several significant monuments and chapels there. While previous cemetery designs had followed a classical style, Tite's design was the first to employ the Gothic Revival alongside landscaping, which was subsequently judged to be the archetype for future cemeteries.

Between 1853 and 1854, with Sydney Smirke, he landscaped Brookwood Cemetery near Woking in Surrey for the London Necropolis Company. Maintaining his associations with railways, this cemetery was served by a dedicated train service from London Necropolis railway station, next to Waterloo station, in central London.

Between 1858 and 1859 he built a memorial church in the Byzantine style at Gerrards Cross, Buckinghamshire.

== Later life ==
Tite's active work as an architect ceased about twenty years before his death (in recognition of his contributions, however, he was awarded the RIBA Royal Gold Medal in 1856).

In 1851 he visited Italy after a grave illness. In 1854 he stood for parliament, unsuccessfully contesting Barnstaple as a Liberal, but the following year he was returned as Member of Parliament for Bath, which he represented until his death. He keenly opposed Sir George Gilbert Scott's proposal to build the new Foreign and Commonwealth Office and other government buildings adjacent to the Treasury in Whitehall in the Gothic style. He was knighted in 1869 and was made a Companion of the Bath the next year. Tite had a wide knowledge of English literature and was a good linguist and a lover of old books. He was elected a fellow of the Royal Society in 1835, and a fellow of the Society of Antiquaries of London in 1839. He was President of the Camden Society and of the Royal Institute of British Architects.

He was a director of the London and Westminster Bank and Governor of the Bank of Egypt; in 1856 he was nominated a member of the Select Committee on the Bank Charter. He was a member of the Metropolitan Board of Works, a magistrate of Middlesex and Somerset and Deputy Lieutenant for London. He was also a Governor of St. Thomas's Hospital, London, where he is commemorated by the William Tite Scholarship, for the best student in the first year, with the highest aggregate marks in Anatomy and Physiology. After over 125 years, this prize has been subsumed into King's College London, where it is still awarded for excellence in the pre-clinical medical course.

He died on 20 April 1873 at Torquay and was interred in the catacombs of his South Metropolitan Cemetery. Tite Street, which runs north-west from London's Chelsea Embankment, is named for him.

== Gallery of architectural work ==
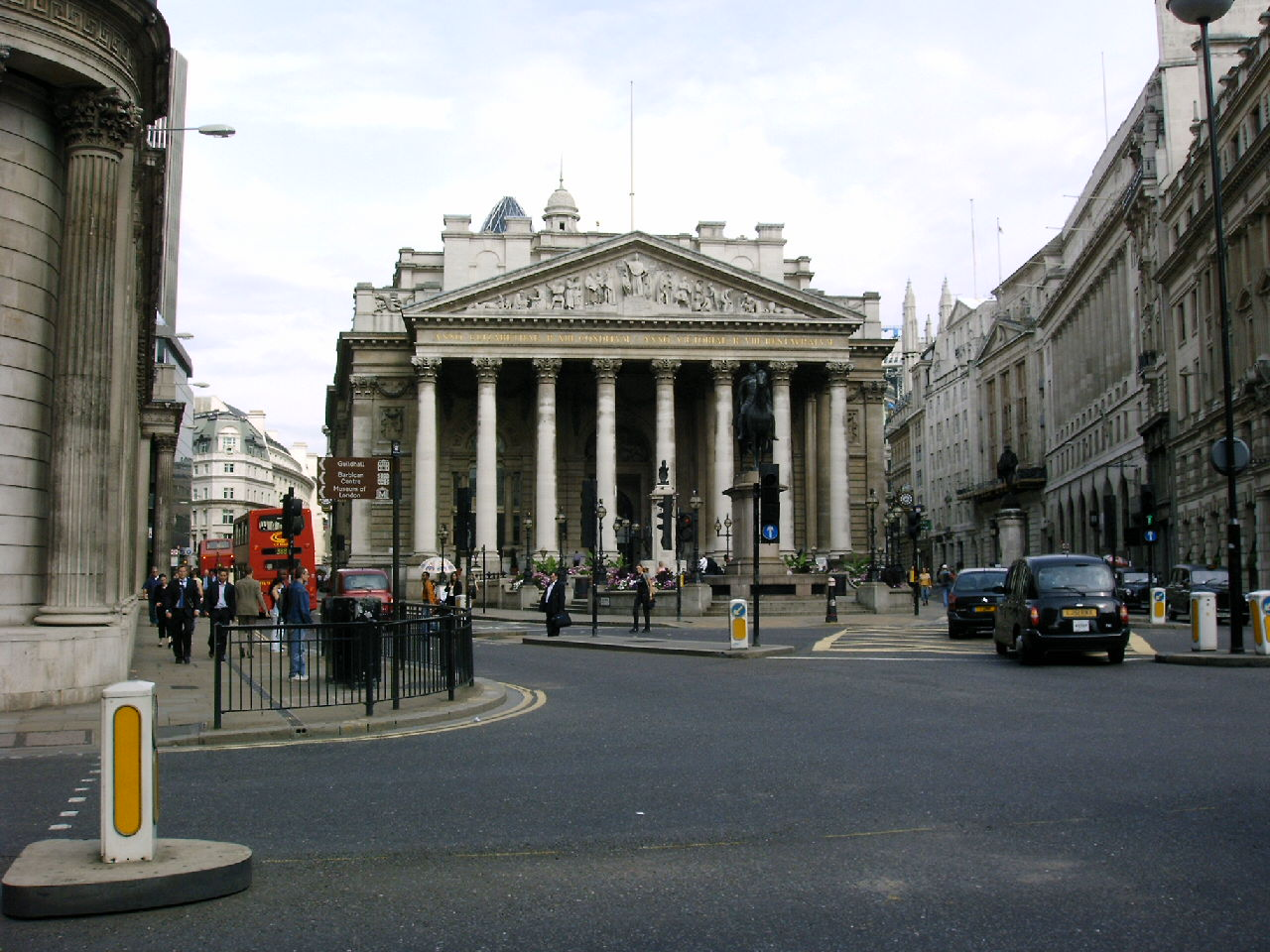
Royal Exchange, London

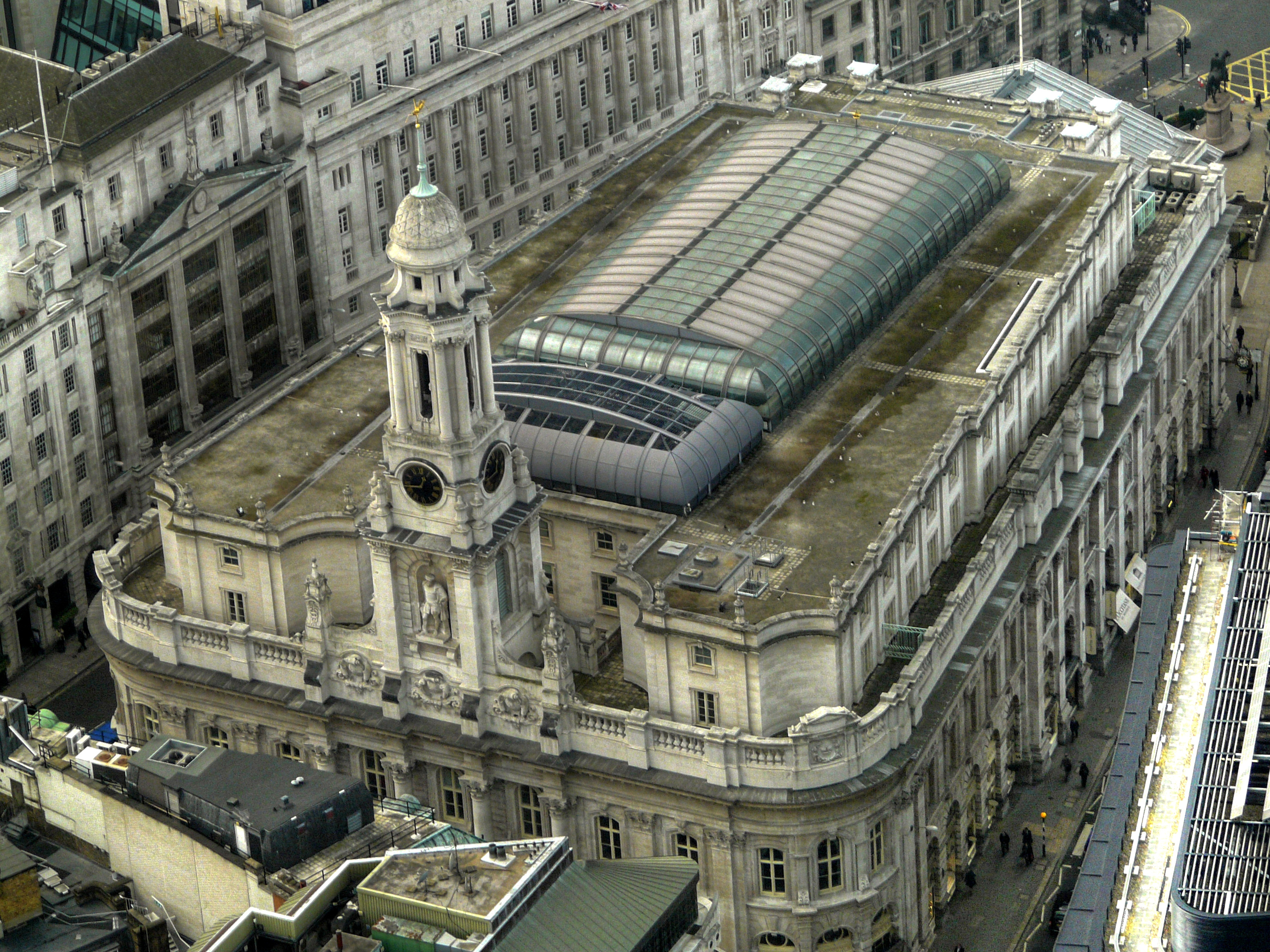
Aerial View, Royal Exchange, London

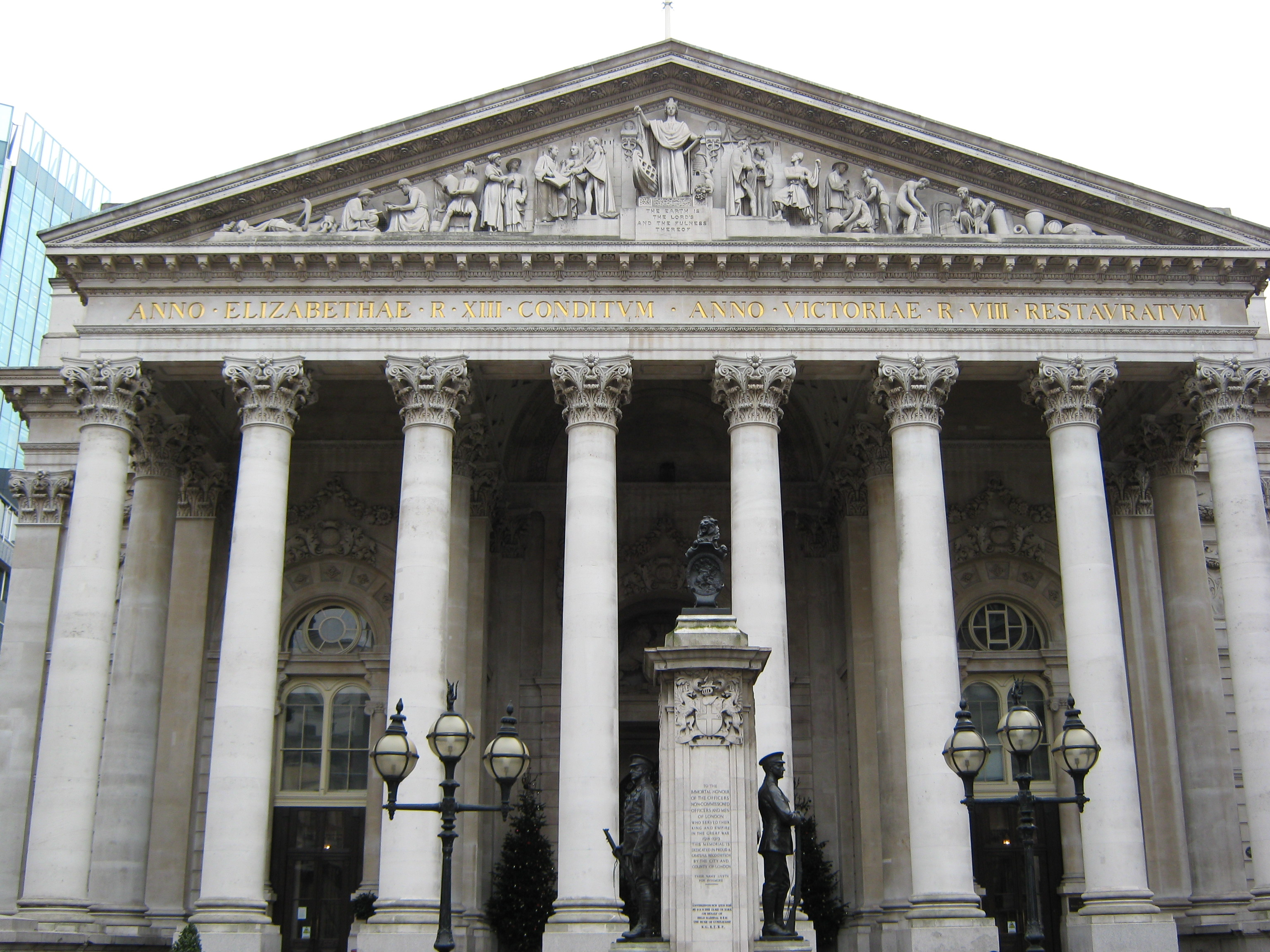
Portico, Royal Exchange, London

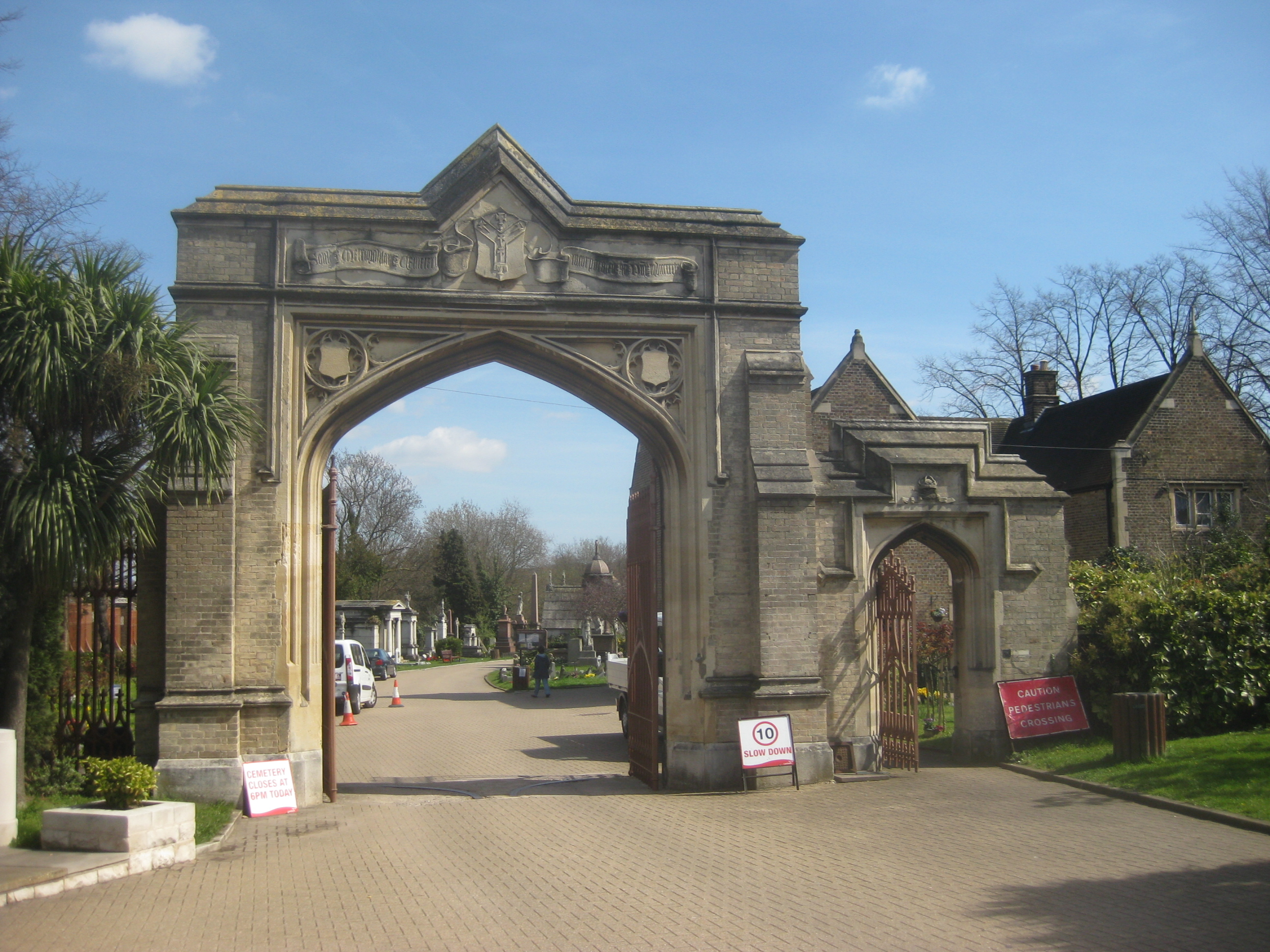
Gothic entrance, West Norwood Cemetery

== Notes ==
Parliament of the United Kingdom
Preceded by George Treweeke Scobell and Thomas Phinn	Member of Parliament for Bath; 1855–1873; With: George Treweeke Scobell, to 1857; Sir Arthur Elton, 1857–1865; Arthur Edwin Way, 1859–1865; James Macnaghten McGarel-Hogg, 1865–1868; Donald Dalrymple from 1868	Succeeded by The Viscount Chelsea and Donald Dalrymple
