= George Treweeke Scobell =

British politician (1785–1869)

George Treweeke Scobell (16 December 1785 – 11 May 1869) was the son of Dr Peter Edward Scobell, MD and Hannah née Sandford.

He joined the British Navy in 1798 as midshipman aboard HMS St Albans, under Captain Francis Pender; and served until accepting the rank of Retired Captain in 1843.

He was Member of Parliament for Bath 1851 to 1857.

== See also ==
- O'Byrne, William Richard (1849). "Scobell, George Treweeke" . A Naval Biographical Dictionary . John Murray – via Wikisource.

Parliament of the United Kingdom
Preceded by Lord Ashley; Viscount Duncan	Member of Parliament for Bath; 1851 – 1857; With: Viscount Duncan to 1852; Thomas Phinn 1852–55; William Tite from 1855	Succeeded by Sir Arthur Elton, Bt; William Tite
