= William Graham Greene =

English civil servant

Sir Graham Greene KCB JP

Permanent Secretary of the Ministry of Munitions
- In office 1917–1920
- Monarch: George V
- Prime Minister: David Lloyd George
- Minister: Winston Churchill
- Preceded by: Edmund Bampfylde Phipps
- Succeeded by: Sigmund Dannreuther

Permanent Secretary to the Admiralty
- In office 1911–1917
- Monarch: George V
- Prime Minister: H. H. Asquith; David Lloyd George
- Minister: Reginald McKenna; Winston Churchill; Arthur Balfour
- Preceded by: Inigo Thomas
- Succeeded by: Oswyn Murray

Personal details
- Born: 16 January 1857 Takeley, Essex, England
- Died: 10 September 1950 (aged 93) Harston House, Harston, Cambridgeshire, England

Sir William Graham Greene KCB JP (16 January 1857 – 10 September 1950), more commonly referred to as Sir Graham Greene, was an English civil servant who served as Permanent Secretary to the Admiralty from 1911 to 1917, during the time of the First World War. Greene was one of the founders of Naval Intelligence in the First World War, and was still involved in Intelligence in the Second World War.

He was born in Takeley, Essex, the son of William Greene, of East Lodge, Bedford, and his wife, Charlotte. He was known as Graham, so as not to be confused with his father, and was the uncle of the celebrated author of the same name, who wrote of memorable childhood summers spent at Sir Graham's home, Harston House. He was also the uncle of Hugh Greene, who served as Director-General of the BBC, and Raymond Greene, the eminent physician and mountaineer. He was educated privately in Germany and at Cheltenham College.

Between 1875 and 1879 he worked first at the family brewery in Bury St Edmunds, now known as the Greene King Brewery. He began his career as a civil servant at the Inland Revenue in 1879, and two years later he transferred to the Admiralty. In 1887, he became an assistant private secretary to the First Lord of the Admiralty, serving as such to Lord George Hamilton, George Robinson, 1st Marquess of Ripon, John Spencer, 5th Earl Spencer, George Goschen and William Palmer, 2nd Earl of Selborne. Greene was actively involved in the heavy administrative work during a time of considerable reorganisation and expansion of the Navy.

From December 1902 to 1907, he served as a principal clerk in the Secretary's Department. and under John Fisher, 1st Baron Fisher, assisted with significant further reorganisation. In 1907, he was appointed Assistant Secretary of the Admiralty, and in September 1911 succeeded Sir Inigo Thomas as Permanent Secretary. He served in this capacity for six years of what The Times newspaper called "crushing responsibility" in the First World War, as the Admiralty was preparing for and directing massive operations vital to the war effort.

In 1917, the Admiralty and other departments saw significant changes, and Greene was invited to assume the Secretaryship of the Ministry of Munitions. Greene's many years of experience were an asset needed in the new Ministry. He took up his new post in August 1917 and remained at the Ministry of Munitions until his retirement in 1920.

According to The Times, Greene "was a conscientious, zealous, and greatly experienced officer, but his modest nature deprived him of the strong personality which might have given him greater influence in the conduct of affairs."

He died unmarried at Harston House, Harston, Cambridgeshire, in 1950.

Government offices
Preceded by Sir Inigo Thomas	Permanent Secretary to the Admiralty; 1911–1917	Succeeded by Sir Oswyn Murray
