= Allensmore =

Village in Herefordshire, England

Coordinates: 52.021°N 2.787°W

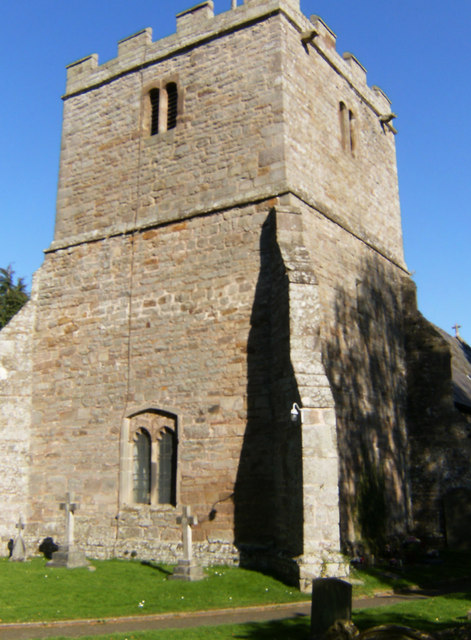
- St Andrew's Church

- Location within Herefordshire
- Population: 566 (2011)
- OS grid reference: SO4635
- Unitary authority: Herefordshire
- Ceremonial county: Herefordshire
- Region: West Midlands
- Country: England
- Sovereign state: United Kingdom
- Post town: HEREFORD
- Postcode district: HR2
- Dialling code: 01981
- Police: West Mercia
- Fire: Hereford and Worcester
- Ambulance: West Midlands
- UK Parliament: Hereford & South Herefordshire

Allensmore is a village in Herefordshire, England. It is located on the A465 road about 4 miles (6 km) south-west of Hereford. The church is dedicated to Saint Andrew.

== History ==
The name 'Allensmore' derives from 'Alan's Moor'. It has been suggested that Allensmore is the place referred to as More in the Domesday Book. Cricketer Charles Littlehales was the parish Vicar from 1930 to at least 1941.
