= Richard Crowder =

British politician and judge

Sir Richard Budden Crowder, QC (17 May 1796 – 5 December 1859) was a British Liberal Party politician and judge.

He was elected at a by-election in 1849 as Member of Parliament (MP) for Liskeard in Cornwall, and held the seat until he resigned from the House of Commons in March 1854 to take an appointment as a judge in the Court of Common Pleas. Whilst in Parliament, he was simultaneously Judge Advocate of the Fleet from 1849 to 1854.

Parliament of the United Kingdom
Preceded by Charles Buller	Member of Parliament for Liskeard; 1849 – 1854	Succeeded by Ralph Grey
Legal offices
Preceded by R. Godson	Judge Advocate of the Fleet; 1849–1854	Succeeded by Thomas Phinn
