= John Gerald Lang =

British Admiralty official and wartime gunner (1896–1984)

Sir John Gerald Lang, GCB (20 December 1896 – 22 September 1984), was a British civil servant who held the position of Permanent Secretary of the Admiralty from 1947 to 1961.

== Family and education ==
Lang was born in Woolwich, to George Thompson Lang, an engineering toolmaker, and his wife Rebecca Davies. He was educated at Haberdashers’ Aske's School in Hatcham, London.

In 1922 he married Emilie Jane Goddard (daughter of Henry Shelley Goddard), with whom he had one daughter. Emilie died in 1963, and in 1970 he married her sister, Kathleen Winifred Edmeades, the widow of Cecil George Elliott Edmeades.

== Career ==
Lang entered the British Civil Service in 1914, joining the Admiralty. During the First World War, he served with the Royal Marine Artillery before returning to the Civil Service. Appointed an assistant secretary in 1939, he was its Director of Labour during the Second World War, responsible for the recruitment, organisation and deployment of dockyard and shipyard labour. As under-secretary from 1946, he contributed to the reorganisation of naval manpower to a peacetime level.

When the Permanent Secretary of the Admiralty, Sir Henry Vaughan Markham, died prematurely in December 1946, Lang was chosen as his successor. He was a highly regarded permanent secretary, and served from 1947 until his retirement in 1961. During this time he was also a Lord Commissioner of the Admiralty.

== Retirement ==
During retirement Lang served as vice-president of both the Royal Naval Association and the Royal Institution of Naval Architects. He was President of the Samuel Pepys Club and a member of the Navy Records Society and the Worshipful Company of Shipwrights.

In 1969, during his time as the Government's principal adviser on sport (1964–1971) and Deputy Chairman of the Sports Council, he chaired a working group that produced a report on crowd control at football matches.

Lang was also a governor and officer of Bethlem Royal Hospital and Maudsley Hospital (1961–1970) and, in his eighties, an adviser to Help the Aged.

He died at Tadworth, Surrey, at the age of 87.

== Honours ==
Lang was made a Companion of the Order of the Bath (CB) in 1946, A Knight Commander of the Order of the Bath (KCB) in 1947 and a Knight Grand Cross of the Order of the Bath (GCB) in 1954.

Government offices
Preceded by Sir Henry Vaughan Markham	Permanent Secretary of the Admiralty; 1947–1961	Succeeded by Sir Clifford Jarrett
