= Evan MacGregor =

British civil servant (1842–1926)

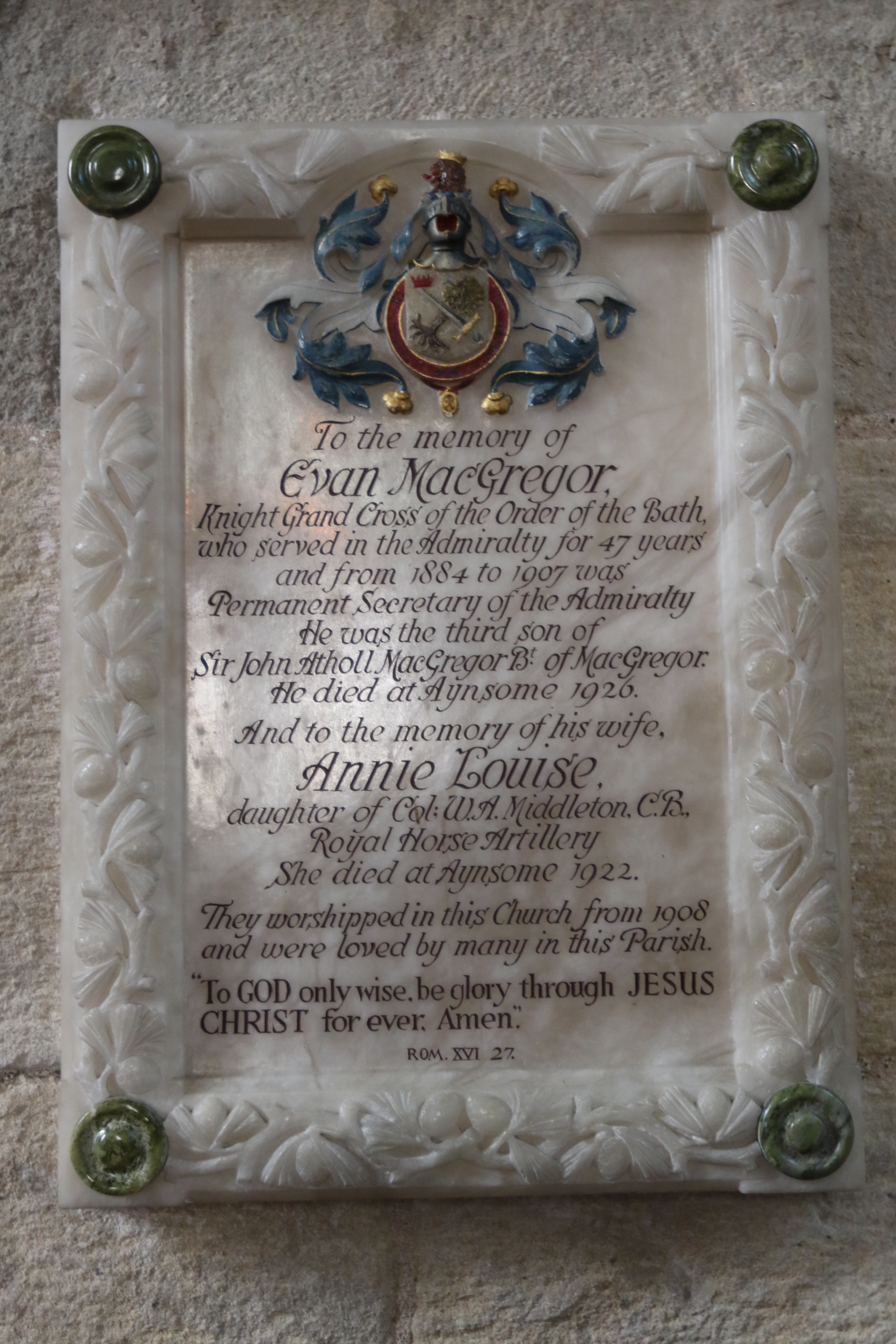
Memorial in Cartmel Priory

Sir Evan MacGregor, GCB, ISO (31 March 1842 – 21 March 1926) was a British civil servant.

== Biography ==
MacGregor was born on 31 March 1842, the third son of Sir John Athol Bannatyne Murray MacGregor, 3rd Baronet, and his wife Mary Hardy, daughter of Vice-Admiral Sir Thomas Masterman Hardy, 1st Baronet. He was educated at Charterhouse School. In 1884 he was married to Annie Louise Middleton, daughter of Colonel William Alexander Middleton CB; they had one daughter, Eva Mary McGregor (1886–1964), who died unmarried.

MacGregor served as Permanent Secretary to the Admiralty from 1884 to 1907. He was made KCB in 1893, ISO in 1902 and GCB in 1906. He lived at Aynsome, Cartmel, Lancashire, and was a member of the Caledonian Club; he also served as a Justice of the Peace. Sir Evan MacGregor died on 21 March 1926; his wife had died in 1922.

Government offices
Preceded by Sir George Tryon	Permanent Secretary to the Admiralty; 1884–1907	Succeeded by Sir Charles Inigo Thomas
