= Clifford Jarrett =

British civil servant

Sir Clifford George Jarrett KBE CB (10 December 1909 – 9 July 1995) was a British civil servant who held the position of Permanent Secretary in various Government departments in the 1960s.

== Family and education ==
Jarrett was born in Dover to George Henry Jarrett, who ran a photographic business, and his wife Kate Ellen Elgar. While his father was away during the First World War, the family home in Dover was bombed and the Jarretts resided in Canterbury from 1917 to 1919.

In 1920 Jarrett won a scholarship to Dover County School for Boys (now Dover Grammar School for Boys). After winning an open scholarship to Sidney Sussex College, Cambridge, he graduated in 1931 with a double first in the modern languages tripos.

In 1933 he married Hilda Alice Goodchild, with whom he had one son and two daughters. After Hilda's death in 1975 he married Mary Evelyn Beacock in 1978.

== Career ==
Jarrett entered the British Civil Service in 1932, joining the Home Office before transferring to the Admiralty two years later. He served as Private Secretary to successive Parliamentary Secretaries, Lord Stanley and Geoffrey Shakespeare, and from 1940 to 1944 was Private Secretary to the First Lord of the Admiralty, A. V. Alexander.

He succeeded Sir John Lang as Permanent Secretary of the Admiralty in 1961, holding the office until the Admiralty was abolished in 1964 and its functions merged to form the Ministry of Defence. During this time he was also a Lord Commissioner of the Admiralty.

In 1964 Jarrett transferred to the Ministry of Pensions and National Insurance as Permanent Under-Secretary, until it merged with the Ministry of Health to form the Department of Health and Social Security, where, as Permanent Secretary from 1968 until his retirement in 1970, his relationship with the Minister, Richard Crossman, was not always easy.

== Retirement ==
In 1971 Jarrett was appointed Chairman of the Dover Harbour Board, overseeing rapid expansion of the Port of Dover and growth in cross-Channel trade until he stepped down from the role in 1980. He was also Chairman of the Tobacco Research Council from 1971 to 1978 and a trustee of the National Maritime Museum from 1969 to 1981.

In 1976 he retired to Menston, West Yorkshire, where he died at the age of 85.

== Honours ==
Jarrett was made a Commander of the Order of the British Empire (CBE) in 1945, a Companion of the Order of the Bath (CB) in 1949 and a Knight Commander of the Order of the British Empire (KBE) in 1956.

Government offices
Preceded by Sir John Lang	Permanent Secretary to the Admiralty; 1961–1964	Succeeded by Office abolished
