= Robert Hall (Royal Navy officer) =

Vice-Admiral Robert Hall CB
- Born: 5 July 1817
- Died: 11 June 1882 (aged 64)
- Burial place: Mount St Bernard Abbey, Leicestershire
- Military career
- Allegiance: United Kingdom
- Branch: Royal Navy
- Rank: Vice-Admiral
- Conflicts: Crimean War
- Awards: Companion of the Order of the Bath

Vice-Admiral Robert Hall, CB (5 July 1817 – 11 June 1882) was a Royal Navy officer who served as Third Lord and Controller of the Navy.

== Early life ==
He was the natural son of Sir Robert Hall (1778-1818), a naval officer, and Miss Mary Ann Edwards.

== Naval career ==
Hall joined the Royal Navy in 1833. Promoted to captain in 1855, he commanded HMS Gladiator in the Sea of Azov and HMS Miranda in the Black Sea during the Crimean War. He was then given command of HMS Termagant.

He was appointed Private Secretary to the Duke of Somerset (First Lord of the Admiralty) in 1863, Superintendent of Pembroke dockyard in 1866 and Third Lord and Controller of the Navy in 1871. He was afterwards Naval Secretary of the Admiralty from 1872 to 1882 and acting Permanent Secretary to the Admiralty in 1882 in the absence of the incumbent.

Hall was laid to rest in the secular cemetery of Mount St Bernard Abbey, Leicestershire.

== See also ==
- O'Byrne, William Richard (1849). "Hall, Robert" . A Naval Biographical Dictionary . John Murray – via Wikisource.

Military offices
Preceded by Sir Spencer Robinson	Third Lord and Controller of the Navy; 1871–1872	Succeeded by William Stewart as Controller of the Navy
