= Judge Advocate of the Fleet =

Civilian judicial appointment in the Royal Navy

Office of the Judge Advocate of the Fleet
- Ensign of the Royal Navy
- Department of the Admiralty, Ministry of Defence
- Member of: Board of Admiralty, Admiralty Board, Navy Board
- Reports to: First Sea Lord
- Nominator: First Lord of the Admiralty, Secretary of State for Defence
- Appointer: Prime Minister; Subject to formal approval by the King-in-Council
- Term length: Not fixed (typically 1–5 years)
- Inaugural holder: Judge Advocate, J. Fowler
- Formation: 1663-2003

The Judge Advocate of the Fleet was an appointed civilian judge who was responsible for the supervision and superintendence of the court martial system in the Royal Navy from 1663 to 2008.

== History ==
The position dates to the sixteenth century but was filled on an occasional basis until 1663 when it became a permanent role. Appointments were by Admiralty Order and included an annual stipend worth £146 between 1663 and 1666, and £182 thereafter. From 1824 the Judge Advocate jointly held the office of Counsel to the Admiralty. later styled as Counsel to the Navy Department, Ministry of Defence. A remunerated position of Deputy Judge Advocate existed from 1668 to 1679, and again from 1684 to 1831.

Until 2004 the Judge Advocate shared responsibility for the naval court martial system with the Chief Naval Judge Advocate previously known as the Deputy Judge Advocate of the Fleet, a legally trained serving naval officer who was responsible for the appointment of judge advocates. However the Chief Naval Judge Advocate's post was abolished in 2004 following a ruling by the European Court of Human Rights that held that, as a serving naval officer, his position was insufficiently independent.

The role of Judge Advocate of the Fleet was taken over by the Judge Advocate General from 2004 onwards. It was formally abolished on 31 December 2008 under the Armed Forces Act 2006.

== Judge Advocates of the Fleet ==
- 1663 J. Fowler
- 1672 J. Brisbane
- 1680 H. Croone
- 1689 P. Foster
- 1689 F. Bacher
- 1690 Villiers Bathurst
- 1711 W. Strahan
- 1714 E. Honywood
- 1724 J. Copeland
- 1729 T. Hawes
- 1743 T. Kempe
- 1744 Charles Fearne
- 1768 Sir George Jackson, Bt., MP (Sir George Duckett, Bt. from 1797)
- 1824 Horace Twiss, KC, MP
- 1828 Henry John Shepherd, QC
- 1845 Richard Godson, QC, MP
- 1849 Richard Budden Crowder, QC, MP
- 1854 Thomas Phinn
- 1855 William Atherton, QC, MP
- 1859 Robert Porrett Collier, QC
- 1863 Thomas Phinn, QC
- 1866 John Walter Huddleston, KC
- 1875–1904 Alexander Staveley Hill, KC
- 1904–1924 Sir Reginald Brodie Dyke Acland, KC
- 1924-1933 Charles Murray Pitman, KC
- 1933 John Graham Trapnell, KC
- 1943 John Lhind Pratt
- 1945 Hon. Ewen Edward Samuel Montagu, CBE, QC
- 1973 William McLaren Howard, QC
- 1986 HHJ Andrew Felix Waley, VRD, QC
- 1995 HHJ John Lionel Sessions
- 2004 Moribund
- 2008 Abolished

== Deputy Judge Advocates of the Fleet ==
- 1668 J. Smith
- 1675 J. Southerne
- 1677 W. Hewer
- 1684 J. Walbanke
- 1687 S. Atkins
- 1689 M. Tindall
- 1692 S. Pett
- 1693 J. Burchett
- 1694 G. Larkin
- 1697 J. Fawler
- 1703 W. Rock
- 1707 M. Ferrabosco
- 1707 E. Honywood
- 1714 J. Copeland
- 1724 W. Bell
- 1740 T. Kempe
- 1743 Charles Fearne
- 1744 E. Mason
- 1745 G. Atkins
- 1754 J. Clevland
- 1762 R. Higgens
- 1780 T. Binsteed
- 1804 M. Greetham
- 1843 G. L. Greetham
- 1856 W. J. Hellyer
- 1861 W. Eastlake
