= Benjamin Tucker (civil servant) =

English civil servant (1762–1829)

Benjamin Tucker (18 January 1762 – 11 December 1829) was an English civil servant. He served in the Royal Navy as a purser from 1792 to 1798 and was secretary to the senior naval officer John Jervis, 1st Earl of St Vincent, whom he served under for three more years, until St Vincent was made First Lord of the Admiralty in 1801; Tucker became his private secretary in 1802 and then briefly served as Second Secretary (i.e. Permanent Secretary) at the Admiralty in 1804. Tucker, who has been characterised as "an aggressive Whig", was also appointed by St Vincent to a seat on the Navy Board in November 1801. He was Second Secretary again from 1806 to 1807. From 1810, he was Surveyor-General of Duchy of Cornwall.

After replacing George Purvis as the earl's agent and secretary, Tucker became involved in a dispute with Lord Nelson who sought to reclaim a share of Spanish treasure worth an estimated £14,000.

== Personal life and legacy ==
His brother Joseph Tucker was the master shipwright of Plymouth Dockyard. His son Jedediah published his father's Memoirs of Admiral the Rt Hon. the Earl of St Vincent in 1844; his other son, John Jervis became an admiral in the navy.
