= Inigo Thomas (civil servant) =

English civil servant

Sir Inigo Thomas GCB JP

Permanent Secretary to the Admiralty
- In office 1907–1911
- Monarchs: Edward VII; George V
- Preceded by: Evan MacGregor
- Succeeded by: Graham Greene

Personal details
- Born: Charles Inigo Thomas; 21 November 1846 Steyning, Sussex, England
- Died: 9 May 1929 (aged 82) London
- Citizenship: United Kingdom
- Spouse: Emma Millicent Evans (m. 1888)
- Relatives: Freeman Frederick Thomas (brother); Arthur Thomas (brother); 1st Marquess of Willingdon (nephew)
- Education: Marlborough College

Sir Charles Inigo Thomas (21 November 1846 – 9 May 1929) was an English civil servant who spent his entire career in the Admiralty, serving as Permanent Secretary to the Admiralty from 1907–11.

== Early life and education ==
Thomas was born in Steyning, Sussex, the fourth son of Freeman Thomas and his wife, Amelia, daughter of Colonel Thomas Frederick. His elder brother Freeman Frederick Thomas, a noted cricketer, was the father of Freeman Freeman-Thomas, 1st Marquess of Willingdon, Viceroy of India, and his younger brother was the composer Arthur Thomas. He was educated at Marlborough College, and he was a cousin of the gardener and artist Francis Inigo Thomas, also known as Inigo.

== Career ==
Thomas entered the Admiralty in 1865, serving successively as private secretary to Rear-Admiral Arthur Hood, Second Sea Lord, and Rear-Admiral Sir John Edmund Commerell, Fourth Sea Lord. He became a principal clerk in 1885 and was put in charge of the branch that deals with the administration of Naval Law. In 1896, he was transferred to be head of the Secret and Political branch. For his work during this period, in which "a number of important events" concerning the Navy occurred, he was appointed a Companion of the Order of the Bath (CB) in the 1900 Birthday Honours.

He was appointed Assistant Secretary of the Admiralty on 1 December 1902, and five years later accepted the senior post of Permanent Secretary to the Admiralty. He oversaw tremendous expansion of the Navy in response to the growing threat from Germany. Among the reforms he instituted was the development of the Admiralty Library. He remained in this post until September 1911, when he retired at the age of 65.

He was appointed a Knight of the Order of the Bath (KCB) in the 1907 Birthday Honours and upgraded to Knight Grand Cross (GCB) in the 1911 Coronation Honours, two months before his retirement. He was also awarded a Cross of Naval Merit of Spain.

In his retirement, he was chairman of James Lyne Hancock Ltd., India rubber manufacturers. He was a Justice of the Peace for the County of London, and an Associate of the Institution of Naval Architects.

== Personal life ==
In 1888, he married Emma Millicent Evans, daughter of James Nesbitt Evans, of County Donegal. She died in 1923. He died in London in 1929.

Government offices
Preceded by Sir Evan MacGregor	Permanent Secretary to the Admiralty; 1907–1911	Succeeded by Sir William Graham Greene
