= Malcolm Patrick Murray =

British civil servant (1905–1979)

Malcolm Patrick Murray CB
- Born: 10 July 1905; Roehampton, London
- Died: 21 July 1979 (aged 74); Fordingbridge, Hampshire
- Burial place: Bournemouth Crematorium and North Cemetery, Dorset
- Education: Uppingham School, Exeter College Oxford
- Occupation: Civil Servant
- Years active: 1929–1965
- Employer: British civil service
- Organization(s): Air Ministry, Special Operations Directive, Ministry of Fuel and Power
- Spouse(s): Betty Violet Black (m. 1934–1955), Maisie Nora Salmond (m. 1956–1979)
- Children: Oswyn Murray (1937– ), James Murray (1938–1954), Theodora Ruth Murray (1942– )
- Parents: Oswyn Alexander Ruthven Murray (father); Mildred Octavia nee March (mother)
- Honours: Companion, Order of the Bath 1954

Malcolm Patrick Murray CB (10 July 1905 – 21 July 1979) was a British civil servant in the Air Ministry, the Special Operations Executive and the Ministry of Fuel and Power.

== Biography ==
Murray was born in Roehampton, London. He attended Uppingham School and Exeter College Oxford where he took a degree in Modern History and Jurisprudence. He was known as Patrick or Pat Murray.

Murray joined the civil service in 1929 as an Assistant Principal in the Air Ministry, and was Private Secretary to the Permanent Secretary of the Air Ministry from 1931-1937. He graduated from the Imperial Defence College in 1938. Murray was recruited by Lord Selborne into the Special Operations Executive in November 1943 to work in the Vice-Chief's office as an officer on special duties at London HQ. He became an Administrative Head organising sabotage and resistance in occupied countries during the Second World War. His service number was 15724, and his classification symbol was V/CD2 from November 1943 and D/CD from January 1944.

After the war he was Under Secretary in the Ministry of Fuel and Power from 1946. Murray was head of the Electricity Division of the Ministry for the exceptionally long period from 1947 to 1959, therefore during the nationalisation of the electricity industry in 1948, and the early stages of the development of the British civil nuclear power programme in the late 1950s. At the suggestion of Lord Citrine, the chairman of the British Electricity Authority (BEA), Murray attended the majority of the meetings between the BEA and the Area Board chairmen. He was thus able to convey government thinking to them informally, while sometimes receiving information off the record and relaying signals back to Whitehall. The sponsorship role of the Electricity Division led to Murray becoming not so much a controller of the industry as an honest broker between the central Authority and the Whitehall machine generally. In 1957 in discussions between the Minister of Power and the Country Landowner's Association the issue was raised whether a public inquiry should be held on any application from the Central Electricity Authority. The Electricity Bill was then being debated in Parliament and the issue might be included in the Bill. Murray was sceptical whether anything would be achieved. The Minister advised there was insufficient time to introduce such measures. Leslie Hannah notes that Murray was 'now not a well man' and had less influence on electricity matters than his fellow under-secretaries Owen Francis from the gas division who had been instrumental in drafting the 1957 Electricity Bill and the economist Philip Chantler. In 1959 Murray was Under-Secretary of the Electricity Division of the Ministry of Power under the Minister Lord Mills.

Following the Public Inquiry into the proposed power station at Holme Pierrepoint, the Planning Inspector rejected the proposal. There was unanimous support for the report within the Ministry of Power. Murray minuted that even if the estimated cost of coal haulage of £600,000 per year was greater at any other site, as estimated by the CEGB, this was only 1 per cent of the annual cost of running the station.

Murray was Director of Establishments Ministry of Power 1959-61 and Deputy Secretary Ministry of Power 1961-65. He retired from the civil service in 1965.

== Personal life ==
He married Betty Violet Black (b. 2 January 1909, daughter of Algernon Murray Black) on 11 August 1934 at Petersham parish church, Surrey. She died in 1955. He secondly married Maisie Nora (Susan) Salmond (daughter of Walter Hemmingway) on 16 January 1956 at the register office Hampstead, London.

In 1943 he listed his recreational interests as walking, rugby football, tennis, rowing and brick laying. His residences included Annery, Roehampton, London (1934); Corners, Bramley near Guildford, Surrey (1939–43); Scotsland, Bramley, Surrey; 1 Greville Place, Maida Vale, London NW6 (1956); Gorbio, France (1966), 26 Templemere, Oatlands Drive, Weybridge, Surrey (1978), and finally at Gorley Green Cottage, South Gorley, Fordingbridge, Hampshire where he died. He made his Will on 13 April 1978. He died of carcinomatosis and carcinoma of the colon. At his death his estate was valued at £18478.

== See also ==
- Oswyn Alexander Ruthven Murray (father)
- Oswyn Murray (son)
