= Penelope Murray =

British historian

Penelope Murray is an expert in ancient history with an interest in ancient poetics and the Muses. After research posts at King's College London and St Anne's College, Oxford, she was a founder member of the department of Classics at the University of Warwick, with promotion to Senior Lectureship in 1998. After retiring from Warwick, Murray has been working on the Blackwell Companion to Ancient Aesthetic, co-editing with Pierre Destrée.

== Selected publications ==
- Murray, Penelope; Wilson, Peter (2004), Music and the Muses : the culture of 'mousikē' in the classical Athenian city, Oxford, OCLC 556974009
- Murray, Penelope; Dorsch, T S (2000), Classical literary criticism, Penguin classics., London, ISBN 9780140446517
- Murray, Penelope (1999), "What is a Mythos for Plato?", in Richard Buxton (ed.), From myth to reason : studies in the development of Greek thought, OCLC 848777577
- Plato; Murray, Penelope (1995), Plato on poetry, Cambridge Greek and Latin classics., Cambridge, ISBN 9780521349819
- Murray, Penelope (1989), Genius : the history of an idea, Oxford, UK, ISBN 9780631157854
