= Oswyn Murray (civil servant) =

British civil servant

Sir Oswyn Murray
- Born: Oswyn Alexander Ruthven Murray; 17 August 1873; Mill Hill, Middlesex, England
- Died: 10 July 1936 (aged 62); Roehampton, London, England
- Education: City of Oxford High School for Boys
- Alma mater: Exeter College, Oxford
- Occupation: Civil servant
- Years active: 1897–1936
- Employer: Admiralty
- Spouse: Mildred Octavia March (m. 1900–1936)
- Children: Malcolm Patrick Murray Priscilla Bergne (married surname)
- Parent(s): James Augustus Henry Murray; Ada Agnes Ruthven
- Relatives: Harold James Ruthven Murray (brother)
- Awards: Order of the Bath; Order of the Rising Sun (Japan); Legion of Honour (France)

Permanent Secretary to the Admiralty
- In office 1917–1936
- Preceded by: Sir W. Graham Greene
- Succeeded by: Sir R. H. Archibald Carter

Sir Oswyn Alexander Ruthven Murray GCB (17 August 1873 – 10 July 1936) was a British civil servant who spent most of his career at the Admiralty, eventually serving as Permanent Secretary from 1917 until 1936.

== Biography ==
Murray was born in Mill Hill, Middlesex, the fourth son (of eleven children) of schoolmaster James Augustus Henry Murray (1837–1915), later the first editor of the Oxford English Dictionary, and his second wife, Ada Agnes (née Ruthven) (1845–1936). His family moved to Oxford in 1885. Murray was educated at the City of Oxford High School for Boys from 1885 to 1891, before entering Exeter College, Oxford where he won first class honours in classical moderations (1893), literae humaniores (1895), and jurisprudence (1896).

After graduating Murray was initially unsure whether to follow a career in the civil service or as an academic. In January 1897 he passed the higher civil service competitive examination, and was appointed a Class I clerk in the Civil Branch at the Admiralty on 1 February 1897. However, later the same year he took part in competitions for the fellowship of All Souls College, which he lost to John Simon, but won the Vinerian Scholarship. However, he declined the offer of a fellowship in law at St. John's College, despite the better salary, in favour of his position at the Admiralty.

Murray was appointed a resident clerk on 1 May 1898, and in July 1899 was promoted to Second Private Secretary to George J. Goschen, the First Lord, becoming Assistant Private Secretary in early 1901. From 1 November he served as Private Secretary to the Parliamentary and Financial Secretary, H. O. Arnold-Forster, and from October 1903 to April 1904, to his successor E. G. Pretyman.

He became assistant principal clerk in 1904, and in October that year was appointed Assistant Director of Victualling and Clothing under Sir Henry Yorke, eventually taking over as Director on 2 December 1905. As Director of Victualling Murray carried out a thorough reform of the system for feeding seamen: rations were overhauled, the savings system (of money taken in lieu of rations) abolished, a messing allowance introduced, the contract canteen arrangement placed on a sound footing, and a school of cookery established.

On 2 October 1911 Murray returned to the secretariat as an Assistant Secretary, and was actively concerned with the preparations for war, then with the difficulties of the administration during the conflict. In 1917 Sir Eric Geddes became First Lord of the Admiralty, and he appointed Murray as Permanent Secretary on 7 August, replacing Sir W. Graham Greene who was transferred to the Ministry of Munitions. Murray served in this post until his death in 1936, and was described as "probably the ablest secretary of the Admiralty in modern times". Much of his time was taken up with negotiating the annual navy estimates with the Treasury, but he managed to preserve much of the resources of the navy at a time of severe government cost-cutting, and also made many needed reforms, putting the Royal Navy in a much more powerful position when war broke out again in 1939 than it might have been.

Murray's health began to suffer, and in 1932 he was obliged to take a period of sick leave, and then again the following year. He had originally planned to retire before February 1934, but he was persuaded to stay on until 1937. However, in June 1936 Murray caught a cold from which he never recovered, and he died at his home in Roehampton, London, on 10 July 1936, and was cremated at Golders Green Crematorium, Middlesex, on 14 July. A memorial service was held for him at St. Martin's-in-the-Fields.

== Personal life ==
Murray became engaged to Mildred Octavia March in 1894, but they could not afford to get married until 1 August 1900. They later had a son and a daughter. Lady Murray died in 1969.

In his spare time Murray was a noted authority on Devon family history.

== Awards and honours ==
Murray was appointed a Companion of the Order of the Bath (CB) in June 1910, was made a Knight Commander (KCB) in January 1917, and a Knight Grand Cross (GCB) in January 1931. In addition, he received the Order of the Rising Sun (2nd class) from the Emperor of Japan in October 1917, and was made a Commander of the Legion of Honour by the President of the French Republic in September 1919, in recognition of his service during the First World War. In 1919 he was elected an honorary fellow of Exeter College.

Government offices
Preceded by Sir William Graham Greene	Permanent Secretary to the Admiralty; 1917–1936	Succeeded by Sir Richard Henry Archibald Carter
