= William Govett Romaine =

English barrister, civil servant and colonial administrator

William Govett Romaine, CB (1815 – 29 April 1893) was an English barrister, civil servant and colonial administrator. His name in early life was William Govett: his father was Robert Govett, vicar of Staines, who changed his surname to Romaine in 1827.

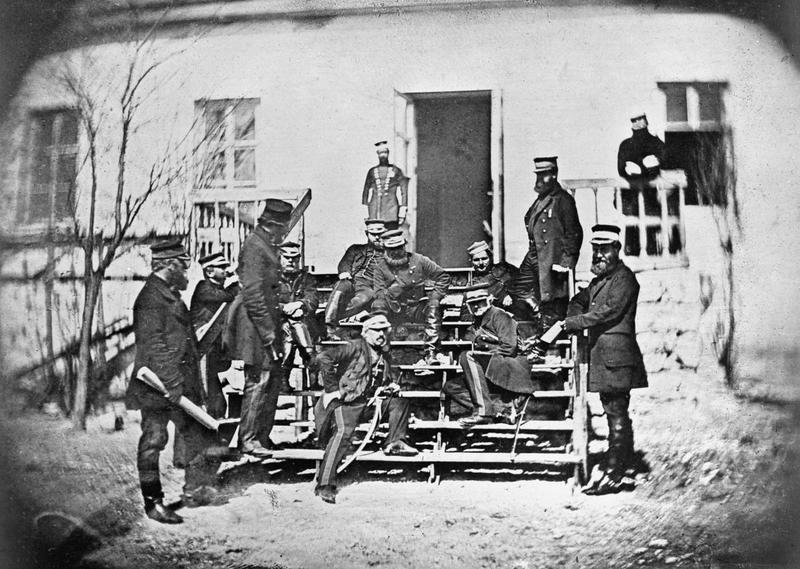
Romaine (second left), with the staff of General Codrington at Sebastopol in 1855

Romaine matriculated at Trinity College, Cambridge in 1833, graduating B.A. 1837 and M.A. 1859. He was called to the bar in 1839 and became a deputy judge-advocate in the army during the Crimean War.

In 1857, Romaine was appointed Second Secretary (i.e. Permanent Secretary) to the Admiralty and served in that office until he was appointed Judge-Advocate-General in India in 1869, during which time he married Frances Tennant of Cadoxton Lodge, Glamorganshire. He left the office in 1873. From 1876 to 1879, he was a member of the Egyptian Conseil du Trésor and served for some of that time as comptroller-general of finances. In his latter years, William Govett retired to the Priory, Old Windsor, where he died on May 5, 1893.
