= Freeman Thomas (cricketer, born 1838) =

English cricketer

Freeman Frederick Thomas (11 April 1838 – 1 December 1868) was an English cricketer active from 1860 to 1867 who played for Sussex. He was born in Lymington, Hampshire, and died in Sanremo, Italy. He appeared in nine first-class matches as a right-handed batsman who scored 89 runs with a highest score of 15.

Thomas was the second son of Freeman Thomas (son of Inigo Thomas (grandson of Sir George Thomas, 1st Baronet) and his wife Hon. Frances Brodrick [daughter of George Brodrick, 4th Viscount Midleton]) and his wife, Amelia, daughter of Colonel Thomas Frederick. His younger brothers included Sir Charles Inigo Thomas and the composer Arthur Goring Thomas.

He married Mabel Brand, third daughter of Henry Brand, 1st Viscount Hampden. Their son, who was only two when Thomas died, became Freeman Freeman-Thomas, 1st Marquess of Willingdon, and also played for Sussex.
