= Edwin Emmanuel Bradford =

English Church of England clergyman and Uranian poet

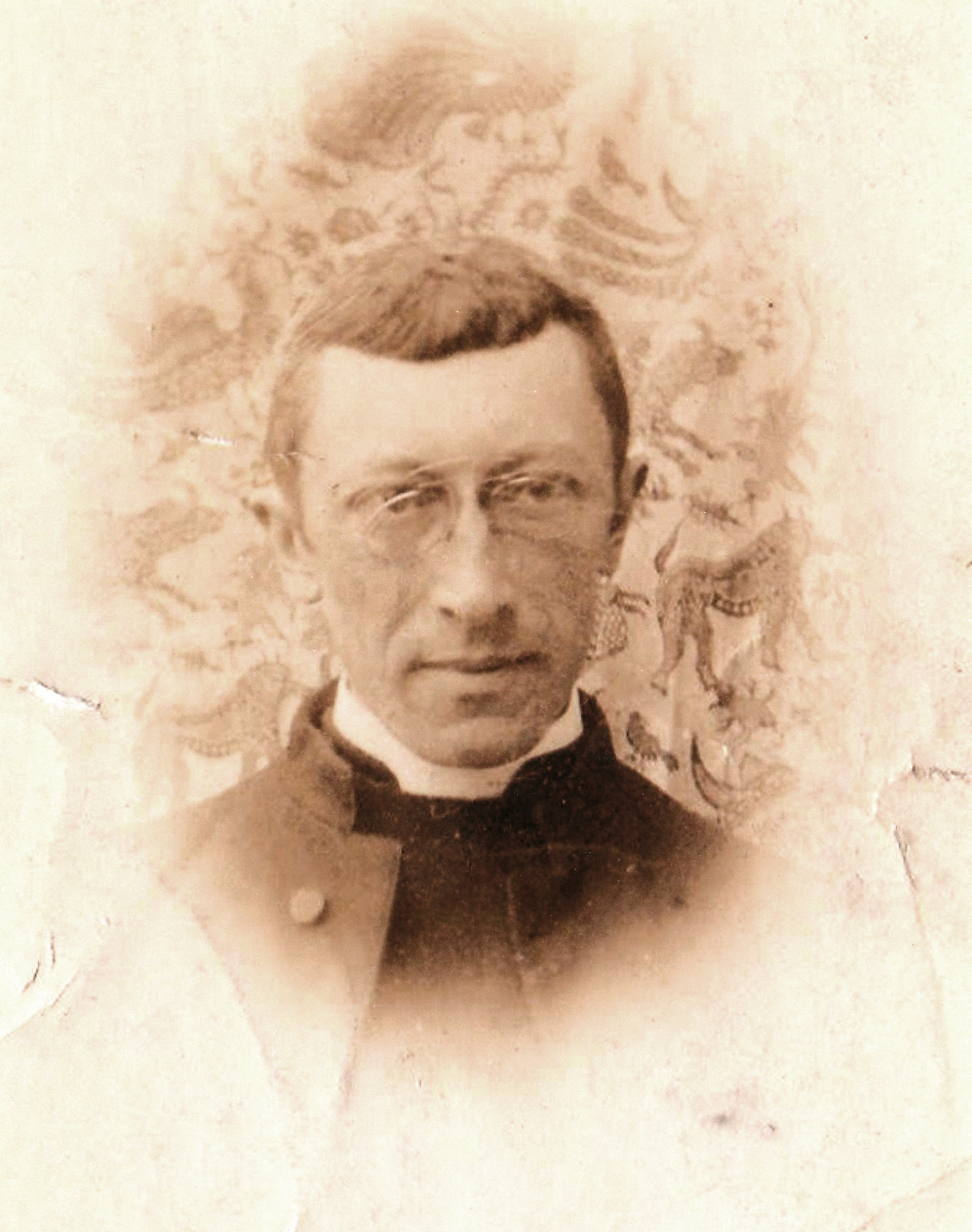
- Rev E.E. Bradford in Paris, c.1897
- Born: 21 August 1860; Torquay, Devon, United Kingdom
- Died: 7 February 1944 (aged 83); Nordelph, Norfolk, United Kingdom
- Education: Exeter College, Oxford

Ecclesiastical career
- Church: Church of England
- Ordained: 1885
- Writing career
- Language: English
- Literary movement: Uranians

Edwin Emmanuel Bradford (21 August 1860 – 7 February 1944) was an English clergyman and a Uranian poet and writer of stories, articles and sermons. His prolific verse celebrating the high spiritual status of love between men and boys was remarkably well-received and favourably reviewed in his lifetime.

== Life ==
=== Early life and education ===
Edwin Emmanuel Bradford was the eighth and youngest child of precious metal worker Edwin Greenslade Bradford, who had a business on the Strand in Torquay, and Maria Wellman. His mother died in 1873 when he was twelve or thirteen. The next year his father, much altered since his wife's death, committed suicide. The young Bradford attended Castle College, a high-class preparatory school in Torquay, and matriculated at Exeter College, Oxford in 1881. He was awarded a Third Class honours B.A. in Theology in 1884, an M.A. in 1901, a Bachelor of Divinity degree in 1904 and, for a thesis arguing that Saint Paul contradicts himself on the subject of free will, a Doctor of Divinity degree in 1912. He referred back to the university later to express an egalitarian view: "And to this day, I'm proud to say, my dear old alma mater / Cares little if you're rich or poor, or who may be your pater!"

=== Church appointments ===
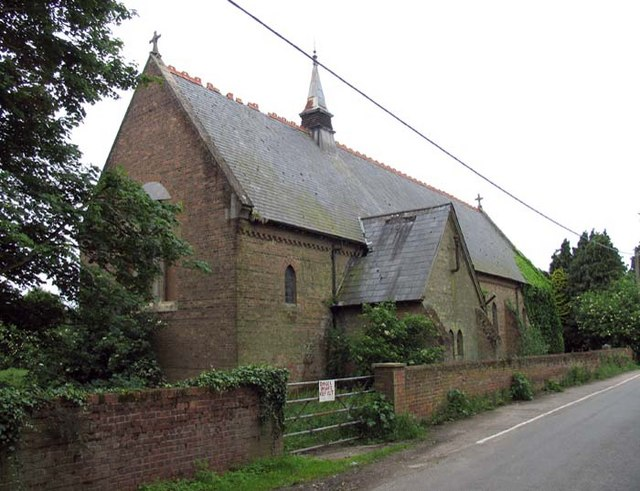
Holy Trinity, Nordelph, where Bradford was vicar from 1909 to 1944

Appointed deacon in 1884, Bradford was ordained as a priest the following year. He served curacies at High Ongar (1884-6) and Walthamstow (St Saviour's, 1887), was assistant chaplain to the English church in Saint Petersburg, Russia (1887-9) and was assistant curate of St George's Church in rue Auguste Vacquerie, Paris (1890-9). After his years in Paris he would continue to enjoy conversing in French.

Back in England he was curate at Eton (1899-1905) and Upwell (Christchurch, 1905-9) before being appointed, on the nomination of Christchurch rector Charles Francis Townley, vicar of Holy Trinity church in the small country parish of Nordelph, Norfolk in 1909. He played the organ himself. Next to the vicarage he had the village boys dig out a swimming pool and pile the soil in the form of small mountains, to recreate his impression of Switzerland during a visit. He allowed his goats to graze around, placed statuettes of lions around the pool and was able to contemplate the young swimmers from his house. The vicarage was hung with many pictures, including reproductions of works by Henry Scott Tuke and a reproduction of The Two Princes Edward and Richard in the Tower by John Everett Millais.

Bradford told the poet John Betjeman, who visited him in Nordelph in 1935, that his last boyfriend was called Edmund and that he had not had a boyfriend for thirty years. He spoke out in favour of birth control and masturbation and said he thought the laws against sexuality were wicked, cruel and out of date. He declared himself to be very happy with his Nordelph curacy. In 1940, he was fined for allowing light to be displayed from his house in contravention of the wartime blackout. He remained unmarried and lived at the Nordelph vicarage with at least two successive housekeepers until his death in 1944, bequeathing his effects to his last housekeeper, Sarah Esther Beales. His death took place at the vicarage and he was buried in Nordelph.

Soil subsidence was a constant problem in Nordelph, and the vicarage was propped up already in Bradford's time. The church, having become structurally unsafe, was demolished in 2010.

Early in life Bradford was an Anglo-Catholic, but he subsequently became a Modernist, albeit one who liked ritual. In his poetry and elsewhere he made clear his opposition to drinking and gambling.

=== Social circle ===
Bradford was a lifelong friend of poet and priest Samuel Elsworth Cottam, with whom he had been an undergraduate classmate and who he had met again at the Anglican church in Paris, where they were both curates. Bradford's friends and acquaintances, often found in Uranian circles, further included Edward Carpenter, George Cecil Ives, John Leslie Barford ("Philebus"), Leonard Henry Green, Horatio Brown, John Betjeman and W. H. Auden. Betjeman stated in a footnote to his poem "A Shropshire Lad" that its opening line, "The gas was on in the Institute," was derived from a line in Bradford's novel in verse Boyhood. Auden referenced Bradford and Bradford's friend Cottam in his long poem "Letter to Lord Byron": "The most I ask is leave to share a pew / With Bradford or with Cottam, that will do".

== Writings ==
=== Poetry ===
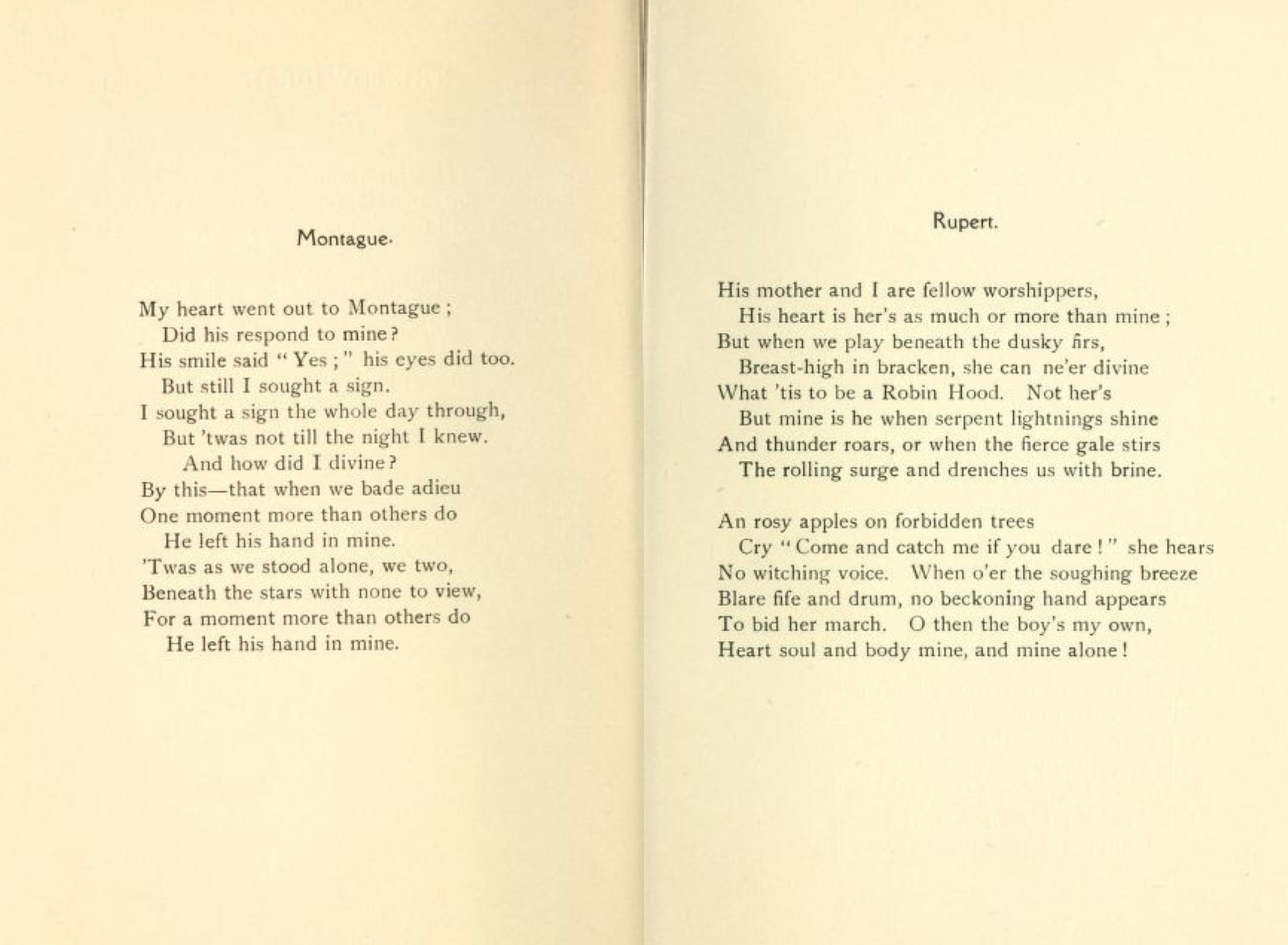
Pages from The Romance of Youth and Other Poems (1920)

The most prolific of Uranian authors, Bradford was principally a poet. Between 1908 and 1930 twelve collections of his poetry were published by Kegan Paul in London. The first collection, with a print run of five hundred copies, was financed by Bradford, subsequent volumes paying their way.

In 2021, Bradford's own copies of his poetry books were acquired for the library of his alma mater, Exeter College. They contain his copious handwritten notes, including copied comments from admirers or critics which demonstrate the closeness of the Uranian circle. Some of Bradford's notes are in a private code as yet uncracked.

==== Themes ====
Extolling the high spiritual status of romantic love between men and boys, Bradford advocates a new chivalry that transcends boundaries of class; an aristocracy of lofty friendship that does not depend on pedigree. His poetry provides a particularly English and Christian take on the love of boys: "Is Boy-Love Greek? Far off across the seas / The warm desire of Southern men may be: / But passion freshened by a Northern breeze / Gains in male vigour and in purity. / Our yearning tenderness for boys like these / Has more in it of Christ than Socrates."

For Bradford, the love of mankind and of beauty on earth is inseparable from the love of God, as he explained in a letter to Leonard Green: "the beauty of Nature suggests what He is like ... and the beauty of His children gives us an idea of His beauty." His hope was to experience in heaven "the growth of love on earth begun", as well as "closer ties to God and man / Which never shall be riven!"

However, this interpretation of beauty and love as linked to the divine does not lead him to reject the physical in favour of an exclusively spiritual love: "The mere word "carnal" shall not me affright; / Nor will I cease, in Puritans' despite, / To love the boyish body with the sprite, / And hymn it too." Moreover, rather than expressing abstracted reflection, Bradford's "poetry of action" often describes concrete events and dramatic situations. This goes so far as to include the frequent use of personal names, the poems describing the narrator's dealings with a myriad of boys such as Eddie Worth, Merrivale White, Leslie de Lampton, Clinton Fane, Merivale Trelawney Bates, Steve Ailwyn, Our Jack, Will, Eric, Aubrey, Silvester, Joe and Jim, and so on.

Bradford's work can just barely be interpreted as a sign of nonsexual romantic friendship with youths ("Nay, boys need love, but not the love of woman: / Romantic friendship, passionate but pure, / Should be their first-love"), but several verses, such as "The Bather in the Blue Grotto at Capri" and "Alan", are plainly erotically inspired. Many of his poems are direct though sometimes self-effacing pleas of love to the young males in his life. In Bradford's own words: "Here's a loyal and a loving heart, / Take it, lad, or leave it."

==== Style ====
Poetic forms employed by Bradford include the narrative ballad, ballad dialogues, Browningesque dramatic monologues and verse resembling the classic Horatian style of A. E. Housman's A Shropshire Lad. A brisk, unencumbered tone and an undertone of irony mark him out as a modern poet.

The atmosphere of his poetry ranges from vigorous, cheerful Edwardian charm, described as "Hinge and Bracket meet John Betjeman", to sensuous poetry reminiscent of "the languid, sun-drenched style of the painter Henry Scott Tuke". In a characterisation of the ambience of his verse, Paul I. Webb writes: "We follow him on moonlit assignations, don our boaters for picnics on the beach, and live – in our imaginations – in a world where the most passionate feelings are expressed by meaningful looks over the Earl Grey and Bath Olivers."

While optimistic in the main, Bradford occasionally turns polemic, as when he attacks some of the motivations for procreation: "Breed on with fury; pour your children in / Till every shop and factory be full, / And labour cheap. What if they're starved and thin? / — I have no heart to procreate / Earth children for the sword: / The Love that links me to my mate, / Himself is his reward."

==== Reception ====
Bradford's outspokenly and unapologetically homoerotic verse was well-received and favourably reviewed in major newspapers and journals during his lifetime – remarkably so, given the public hostility to homosexuality. Reasons for its widespread favourable reception may include a naïve or Platonic reading of the friendships extolled, as well as the prevalent esteem for a classical education, which gave an air of scholarship and respect to homosexuality as expressed in the rarefied world of poetry. In contrast, however, to the classical inspiration of much Uranian poetry, Bradford mostly eschewed mythological allusions and focused on contemporary life: "Talk about the Greeks' impeccability of form: / Give to me a Belton boy whose flesh and blood are warm."

Quite independently from their subject matter, the upbeat self-confidence of his poems resonated with the age: "At once scholarly in their rhythmical craftsmanship and cheering in their fresh and vigorous eloquence, the work [The Romance of Youth and Other Poems] will please any earnest-minded reader in search of relief from the querulous indifference so often exemplified in contemporary verse."

Bradford's insistence on boy love as the highest form of love, and his deprecation of things female, at times led to the charge of misogyny, as when a reviewer of his collection Passing the Love of Women, irked in particular by the lines "we damn ourselves if we condemn her, / She is but meaner man", wrote: "The tenor of the verses as a whole is to denounce the "love of women," and from a perfectly honest belief in their inferiority. It seems to me now to be "up to" some feminist poet to reply." Bradford sought to defend himself against such criticisms by penning the poem "No Misogynist".

The poets Auden and Betjeman were entertained by the apparent naïvety of Bradford's poetry. However, Betjeman appreciated the poet, whom he visited in Nordelph. Lamenting that Bradford's poetry never made it into anthologies, he made an effort to popularise it and anthologised the poem "Paddy Maloy". Betjeman's friend George Alfred Kolkhorst collected Bradford's work. The writer Dorothy L. Sayers, whose father was vicar of Christchurch near Nordelph, called Bradford "an entertaining little crank—and rather a dear", though finding his collections Passing the Love of Women and The New Chivalry unreadable. S. E. Cottam's volume of poetry Cameos of Boyhood (1930) was noticeably imitative of Bradford's verse and delighted the latter: "I nearly always find books of verse unreadably dull. Yours is a complete exception."

Among later commentators on Bradford's poetry, Timothy d'Arch Smith considered that his "ideas were superior to his poetical abilities, but he had a good sense of rhythm and ... his verses rattle along in a breezy, unself-conscious, style". Michael Matthew Kaylor believed that in the course of his two-decade career as a published poet, Bradford had not revealed "any improvement, stylistically or conceptually". Rictor Norton recommended Bradford's poems of "leaping, rollicking freedom" to readers with "a penchant for good old-fashioned apple pandowdy like auntie used to make". Paul I. Webb found the poet's enthusiasms to be catching, noting that it is his "ability to reach out to us that makes Bradford so likeable a character, and which gives his poetry more depth than just a collection of amusingly camp pieces".

Bradford was involved with the production of the first and only issue of The Quorum. A Magazine of Friendship, one of the earliest attempts at establishing a British homosexual magazine, which was privately published and circulated in 1920 as a specimen copy to the members of the British Society for the Study of Sex Psychology. The issue opened out with his poem "Friendship and Love", which concludes: "Which is most dear? Nay, they are one in root: / Love is the blossom, Friendship is the fruit."

=== Prose ===
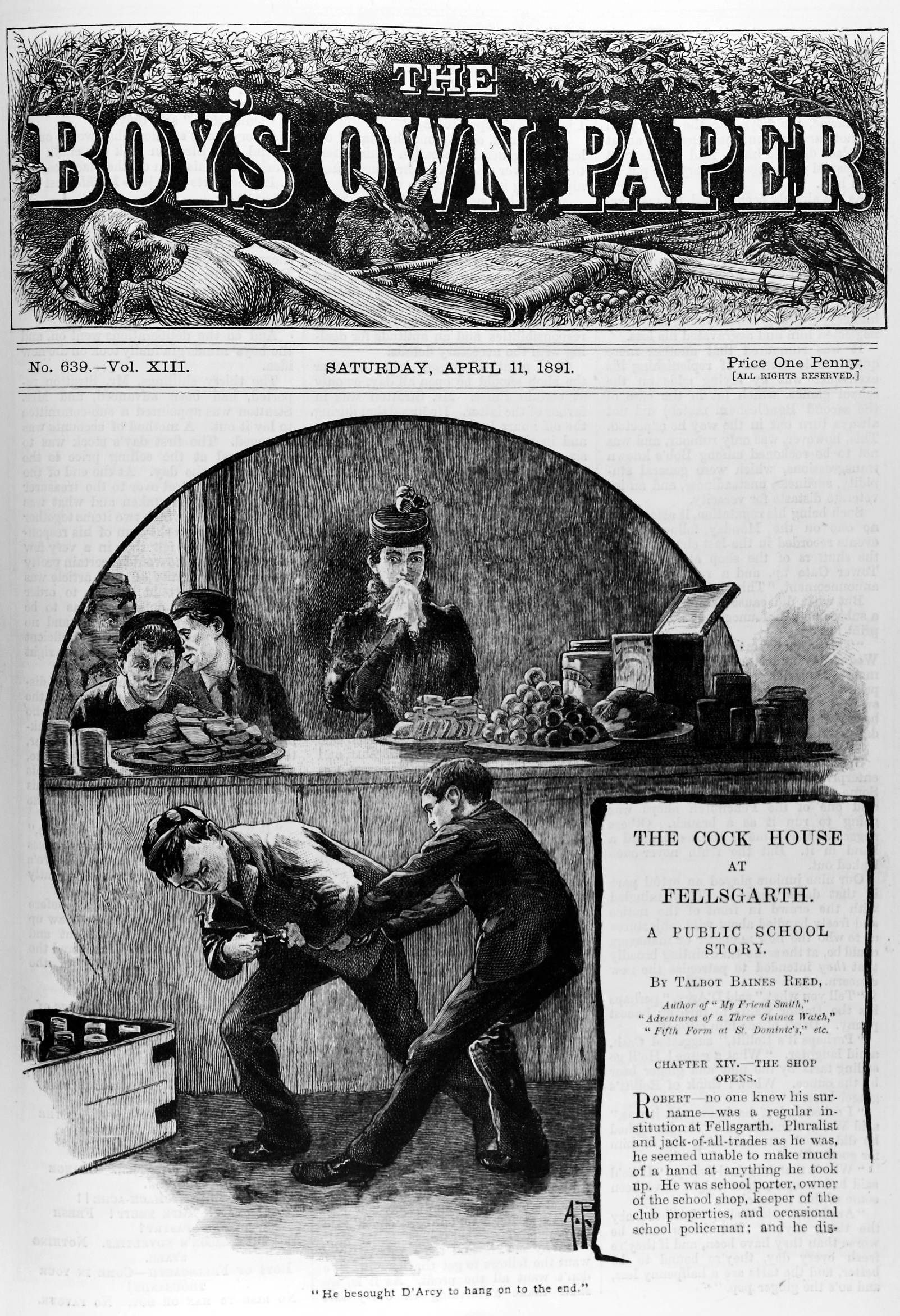
Stories by Bradford appeared in The Boy's Own Paper

Bradford wrote stories of adventure, travel and school life for such magazines as The Captain, Chatterbox and The Boy's Own Paper. He published a collection of articles about gallant chaps at the main public schools of England, Stories of Life at Our Great Public Schools (1908). Written in collaboration with the boys themselves, the articles initially ran through several numbers of Young England.

Bradford's time as a chaplain in Saint Petersburg is reflected in a number of Russian-themed poems and stories. One tale set in Russia, originally printed in The Boy's Own Paper in 1893, was posthumously published in a limited edition by Timothy d'Arch Smith (Boris Orloff: A Christmas Yarn, 1968). It is a sentimental tale of the friendship between two lads, the narrator and Arthur, the son of a Yorkshire vicar. To Arthur's distress, the narrator is obliged to go live in Russia, where he becomes friends with a wild little Russian boy, Boris Orloff, who reminds him of his English chum.

Bradford also published a collection of sermons discussing the human character and humility (Sermon Sketches for the Sundays of the Christian Year, 1907).

== Publications ==
- Sermon Sketches for the Sundays of the Christian Year: Being Fifty-seven Outline Sermons on Texts Taken from the Sunday Epistles Or Gospels, Together with Addresses for Christmas Day and Good Friday (London: Skeffington & Son, 1907) (HaithiTrust e-book)
- Sonnets Songs & Ballads (London: Kegan Paul, Trench, Trubner, 1908, pp. 127) (HaithiTrust e-book)
- Stories of Life at Our Great Public Schools (London: Arthur H. Stockwell, 1908)
- Passing the Love of Women and Other Poems (London: Kegan Paul, 1913, pp. 143)
- In Quest of Love and Other Poems (London: Kegan Paul, 1914, pp. 109) (HaithiTrust e-book)
- Lays of Love and Life (London: Kegan Paul, 1916, pp. 163) (HaithiTrust e-book)
- The New Chivalry and Other Poems (London: Kegan Paul, 1918, pp. 160)
- The Romance of Youth and Other Poems (London: Kegan Paul, 1920, pp. vi, 86) (Archive.org e-book)
- Ralph Rawdon: a Story in Verse (London: Kegan Paul, 1922, pp. vi, 115)
- The True Aristocracy (London: Kegan Paul, 1923, pp. vii, 116)
- The Tree of Knowledge (London: Kegan Paul, 1925, pp. vii, 111)
- The Kingdom Within You and Other Poems (London: Kegan Paul, 1927, pp. v, 64)
- Strangers and Pilgrims (London: Kegan Paul, 1929, pp. vi, 115)
- Boyhood (London: Kegan Paul, 1930, pp. ix, 91)
- Boris Orloff: A Christmas Yarn (Stoke Ferry, Norfolk: Daedalus Press, 1968; limited edition by Timothy d'Arch Smith of 220 copies plus 10 copies on Japanese paper lettered A to J)
- To Boys Unknown. Poems by Rev. E. E. Bradford (London: Gay Men's Press, 1988; introduced and selected by Paul I. Webb, pp. 77)
- My Love Is Like All Lovely Things. Selected Poems of E. E. Bradford (London: Arcadian Dreams, 2023; selected, with an essay on the poet's life and work, by C. Caunter, pp. 323)

== See also ==
- Homoerotic poetry
