= S. E. Cottam =

English poet and Anglican priest

The Reverend S. E. Cottam
- Born: Samuel Elsworth Cottam; 7 August 1863; Salford, England
- Died: 30 March 1943 (aged 79); Oxford, England
- Education: Exeter College, Oxford

Ecclesiastical career
- Religion: Christianity (Anglican)
- Church: Church of England
- Writing career
- Language: English
- Genre: Poetry
- Literary movement: Uranians

Samuel Elsworth Cottam (7 August 1863 – 30 March 1943) was an English poet and Anglican priest.

== Biography ==
Cottam was born in Upper Broughton, Salford, in 1863. He graduated from Exeter College, Oxford, in 1885, where he was a friend of Edwin Emmanuel Bradford. He was a lifelong Anglo-Catholic, unlike Bradford who later became a Modernist. Cottam and Bradford were co-Chaplains of St George's Anglican Church in Paris, France. He was later incumbent at Wootton, Vale of White Horse, where John Betjeman and W. H. Auden went to see him celebrate sung mass.

== Will ==
In his will, Cottam left trust funds for "the purchase of objects of beauty for the furtherance of religion in ancient gothic churches". This trust is now administered by the Friends of Friendless Churches and has been used to benefit many dozens of churches in England and Wales, by the addition of furnishings, stained glass and bells.

== Bibliography ==
- A Lantern for Lent: Brief Instructions on Biblical Subjects for the Forty Days of Lent. London. 1897.
- New Sermons for a New Century. London. 1900.
- The Royal Thanksgiving: A Sermon on the Recovery of King Edward VII. London. 1902.
- "Philosophy of Truth". The Philosopher. 12. 1934.
- Cameos of Boyhood: And Other Poems. London: Arthur H. Stockwell. 1930.
- Friends of My Fancy, and Other Poems. Eton, England: Shakespeare Head Press. 1960.
