= Tavi Murray =

British glaciologist

- Born: 1965
- Awards: David Linton Award (2019); Fellow of the Learned Society of Wales (2012); Commander of the Order of the British Empire (For services to Glaciology and Climate Change Research., 2022); Gordon Warwick Award (2000)

Tavi Murray, CBE FLSW (born 1965) is a British glaciologist and the eighth woman to be awarded the Polar Medal.

== Education ==
After school in Twickenham, Murray gained a BSc degree with first class honours in Physics and Computer Science from the University of Wales, Aberystwyth in 1987. In 1990, she was awarded a PhD in geophysics from the University of Cambridge's Scott Polar Research Institute.

== Academic career ==
In 1993, Murray was appointed lecturer in Physical Geography at the University of Leeds, being promoted to Reader in Glaciology in 2002 and Professor of Glaciology at Leeds in 2004. In 2005, she was appointed Professor of Glaciology at Swansea University where she heads up the Swansea Glaciological Group.

She joined the International Glaciological Society in 1988, acting as a member of the IGS Council as well as initiating the IGS Global Seminar Series in 2020. In 2023, she was awarded the Richardson Medal in recognition of her service to the IGS.

=== Research ===
In 2004, she was a Leverhulme Research Fellow studying "Basal conditions on Rutford Ice Stream, Antarctica".

In 2006, she led a group that showed the speed of the Kangerlussuaq Glacier had doubled in two years, showing the Greenland ice sheet was disappearing quicker than previously thought.

Murray led the GLIMPSE project (2007-2012), which monitored the thinning at the margin of the Greenland ice sheet. It was funded by a Leverhulme Trust Research Leadership Award granted to Murray in 2007.

== Honours and awards ==
In 2007, she was awarded the Polar Medal for studying changes in sea levels caused by the melting of the polar ice caps; unusually, her medal cited discoveries at both poles.

In 2012, Murray was elected a Fellow of the Learned Society of Wales.

Murray was appointed Commander of the Order of the British Empire (CBE) in the 2022 New Year Honours for services to glaciology and climate change research.

== Personal life ==
Murray is an accomplished sea kayaker: she circumnavigated Ireland in May 2017, taking 46 days.
