= Charles Littlehales =

English cricketer

Personal information
- Full name: Charles Gough Littlehales
- Born: 20 May 1871; Bulphan, Essex, England
- Died: 28 August 1945 (aged 74); Wickham Bishops, Essex, England
- Batting: Right-handed
- Role: Wicket-keeper

Domestic team information
- Years: Team
- 1896–1904: Essex

Career statistics
| Competition | First-class |
|---|---|
| Matches | 6 |
| Runs scored | 109 |
| Batting average | 12.11 |
| 100s/50s | –/– |
| Top score | 23 |
| Balls bowled | – |
| Wickets | – |
| Bowling average | – |
| 5 wickets in innings | – |
| 10 wickets in match | – |
| Best bowling | – |
| Catches/stumpings | 4/1 |
- Source: Cricinfo, 31 October 2011

Rev. Charles Gough Littlehales M.A. (20 May 1871 – 28 August 1945) was an English cricketer. Littlehales was a right-handed batsman who fielded as a wicket-keeper. He was born at Bulphan, Essex and was educated at Forest School, Walthamstow, before later attending Exeter College, Oxford.

Littlehales made his first-class debut for Essex against Surrey in the 1896 County Championship. He made five further first-class appearances for Essex, the last of which came against Leicestershire in the 1904 County Championship. In his six first-class appearances, he scored 109 runs at an average of 12.11, with a high score of 23. Behind the stumps he took 4 catches and made a single stumping.

A member of the Anglican Clergy, Littlehales worked as parish Vicar at Allensmore, Herefordshire from 1930 to at least 1941. Littlehales died at Wickham Bishops, Essex on 28 August 1945.
