= Blackham (surname) =

Blackham is an English surname. Notable people with the surname include:

- Blackham baronets
- Dorothy Blackham (1896–1975), Irish illustrator, artist and teacher
- Ernest Blackham (1898–1966), English footballer
- Fred Blackham (1873–1967), Australian rules footballer
- H. J. Blackham (1903–2009), British humanist philosopher, writer and educationalist
- Jack Blackham (1854–1932), Australian cricketer
- Jeremy Blackham (born 1943), British Royal Navy officer
- Joan Blackham (1946–2020), British actress
- Joyce Blackham (1934–2018), British opera singer
- Robert J. Blackham (1868–1951), author, doctor and army officer
- Sam Blackham (1890–1956), English footballer

== See also ==
- Blackham, English village
- Blackham Coliseum, located in Lafayette, Louisiana
