= John Blackham =

John Blackham may refer to:

- Jack Blackham (1854–1932), Australian cricketer
- John Blackham, 2nd Baronet (died 1728), of the Blackham baronets

== See also ==
- Blackham (disambiguation)
