= Caspar Wintermans =

Dutch author and scholar (born 1966)

- Born: May 24, 1966 (age 60); The Hague, Netherlands
- Education: Leiden University
- Occupation: Writer
- Writing career
- Language: Dutch
- Genre: Non-fiction
- Subject: Biography

Caspar Wintermans (born 24 May 1966, The Hague) is a Dutch author and scholar. He studied art history and archaeology at Leiden University.

== Alfred Douglas ==
Much of his work has centered on Lord Alfred Douglas, poet and intimate friend of Oscar Wilde. His published works include Halcyon Days: Contributions to The Spirit Lamp, Dear Sir: Letters of Mr. and Mrs. Couperus to Oscar Wilde, I Desire The Moon: The Diary of Lady Alfred Douglas (Olive Custance), and Oscar Wilde: A Plea and a Reminiscence. He is currently working on an edition of the collected correspondence of Alfred Douglas.

His latest book about Douglas is Alfred Douglas: A Poet's Life and his Finest Work, a biography of 'Bosie' which sets out to defend Oscar Wilde's lover 'Bosie' from over a century of allegedly false accusations and misinformation. Wintermans presents the case that Douglas was, contrary to popular belief, a supportive and kind lover who worshipped the playwright – and whose subsequent life was destroyed. The biographical portion of the book is also accompanied by an anthology of Douglas' poetry. The biography is an expanded English translation of Wintermans' earlier publication, Alfred Douglas. De boezemvriend van Oscar Wilde, which has also been translated into German and published as Lord Alfred Douglas, ein Leben im Schatten von Oscar Wilde.

== Other works ==
In addition to his work on Alfred Douglas, Wintermans is a scholar of Gothic literature. His most recent publication in this area is an unabridged version of Augustus Jacob Crandolph's The Mysterious Hand; Or Subterranean Horrours!, which features an introduction and accompanying notes by Wintermans. This was published by Valancourt Books.

== Bibliography ==
=== Publications by Wintermans ===
- Lord Alfred Douglas. Amsterdam, 1995 (Special edition of Dutch literary periodical Maatstaf)
- Alfred Douglas. De boezemvriend van Oscar Wilde. Amsterdam, 1999
  - Lord Alfred Douglas, ein Leben im Schatten von Oscar Wilde. München, 2001
  - Alfred Douglas. A poet's life and his finest work. London, 2007

=== Collaborative and related publications ===
- Anon, Four anonymous tales: culled from a couple of old-fashioned and scarcely unobtainable English works of light fiction. 1995
- Alfred Douglas, Halcyon Days. Contributions to 'The Spirit Lamp' . Francestown, 1995 [edition of 100 copies]
- Antoine Bodar, Weten waar de muze woont. Amsterdam, 1998
- S. Smits-Dikkers, Jong in oude tijd. Den Haag, 1999
- Alfred Douglas, Oscar Wilde. A plea and a reminiscense. Woubrugge, 2002 [edition of 250 copies]
- Dear sir. Brieven van het echtpaar Couperus aan Oscar Wilde. Woubrugge, 2003 [edition of 250 copies]
- Olive Custance, I desire the moon. The diary of Lady Alfred Douglas (Olive Custance) 1905-1910. Woubrugge, 2004 [edition of 195 copies]
- Augustus Jacob Crandolph, The mysterious hand; or, Subterranean horrours! A romance. Kansas City, 2008
- Een jongen van brutale zwier: Erich Wolfgang Korngold in Nederland 1910-1958, Kallipygos Pers, 2016 [Limited to 500 copies], ISBN 978-90-824364-0-2
- Un scandal Belle Époque: l'Affaire d'Adelswärd à travers la presse parisienne, Éditions Callipyge, 2021 [Limited to 500 copies]
- (with I. Mulders) Een Haagse School: Beeldkroniek van het Aloysius College 1917-2016, Kallipygos Pers, 2025, ISBN 978-90-824364-6-4
