= George Charles Beresford =

British photographer (1864–1938)

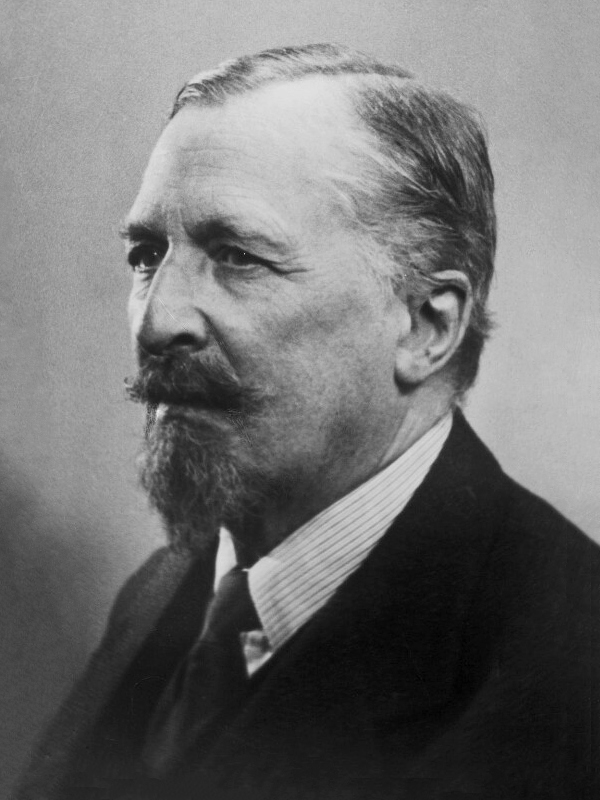
Self-portrait of George Charles Beresford taken in 1934–35

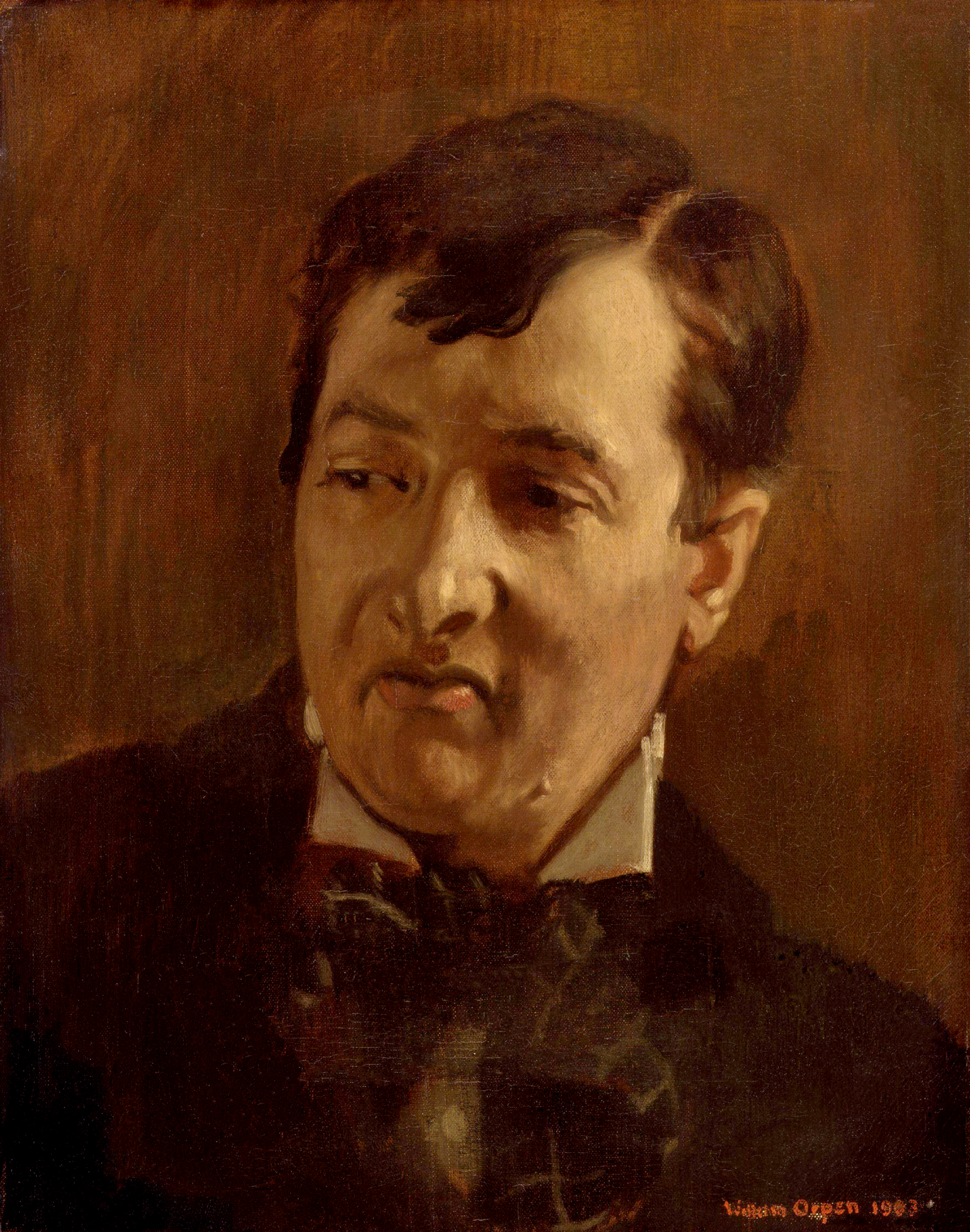
George Charles Beresford (1903) by William Orpen

George Charles Beresford (10 July 1864 – 21 February 1938) was a British studio photographer, originally from Drumlease, Dromahair, County Leitrim.

== Early life ==
A member of the Beresford family headed by the Marquess of Waterford and the third of five children, he was the son of Major Henry Marcus Beresford and Julia Ellen Maunsell. His paternal grandfather was the Most Reverend Marcus Beresford, Archbishop of Armagh, youngest son of the Right Reverend George Beresford, Bishop of Kilmore, second son of John Beresford, second son of Marcus Beresford, 1st Earl of Tyrone.

Beresford was sent to Westward Ho! in 1877 and attended the United Services College. Rudyard Kipling's character M'Turk in his collection of school stories set at the College, Stalky & Co., was based on Beresford, whose autobiography Schooldays with Kipling appeared in 1936.

On leaving in 1882 he enrolled at the Royal Indian Engineering College at Cooper's Hill, and from there went to India in 1882 as a civil engineer in the Public Works Department. After four years he contracted malaria and returned to England to study art, eventually exhibiting at the Royal Academy.

== Later life ==
Between 1902 and 1932 he worked from a studio in Knightsbridge at 20 Yeoman's Row, Brompton Road. Here he produced platinotype portraits of writers, artists and politicians who were celebrities of the time. His images were used in publications such as The World's Work, The Sketch, The Tatler and The Illustrated London News. He donated substantially to the Red Cross in World War I. In his later years he became an antique dealer. In 1943 the National Portrait Gallery acquired some of his negatives and prints from his former secretary.

Beresford was a close friend of Augustus John and Sir William Orpen, another Irishman – they produced a number of images of each other.

== Family ==
Major Henry Marcus Beresford (2 March 1835 – 5 February 1895) and Julia Ellen Maunsell (died 13 October 1923) were married on 10 April 1861. Their children were:

1. Lt.-Col. Kennedy Beresford (25 January 1862 – 25 April 1943) x Grace Des Barres – 1 Gervais De La Poer Beresford, 2 Sybil Beresford
2. Marcus Francis Beresford (26 December 1862 – 14 December 1896) x Fanny Catherine Wingfield
3. George Charles Beresford (10 July 1864 – 21 February 1938)
4. Henry Lowry Lambert Beresford (November 1869 – 25 September 1932)
5. Eva Emily Beresford d. 18 February 1960 x Anthony Fritz Maude

== Gallery ==
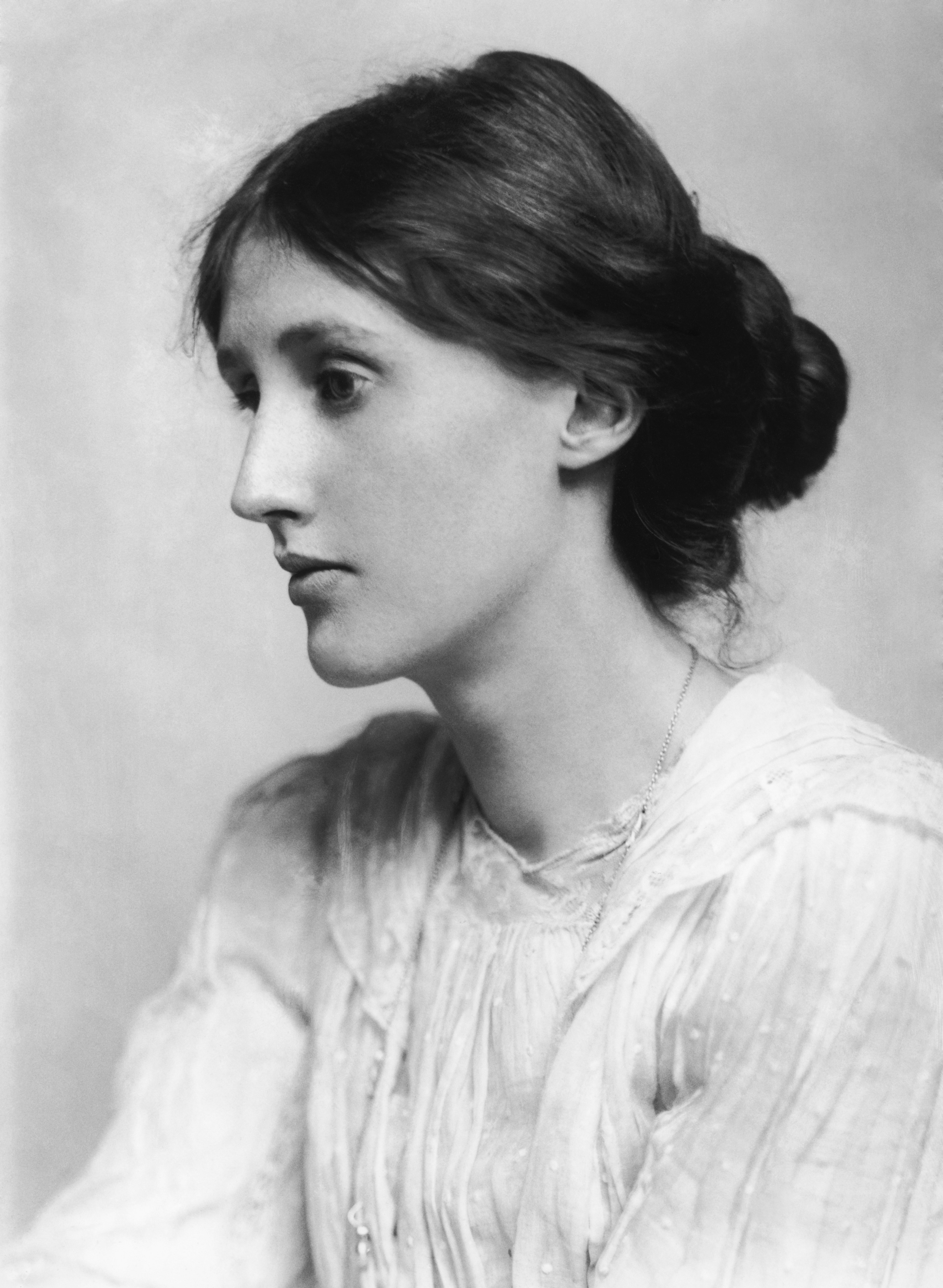
Virginia Woolf (1902)

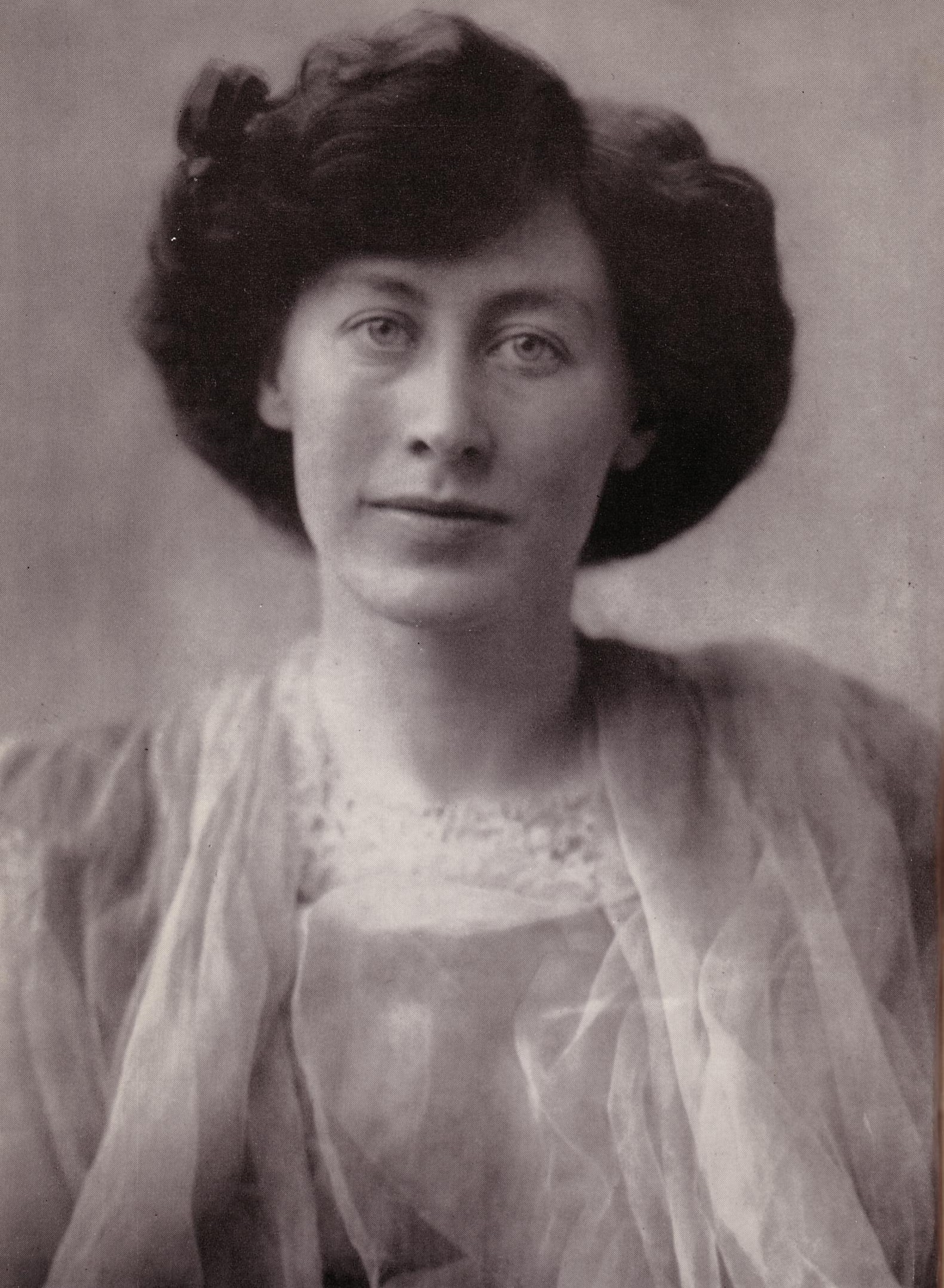
Olive Custance (1902)

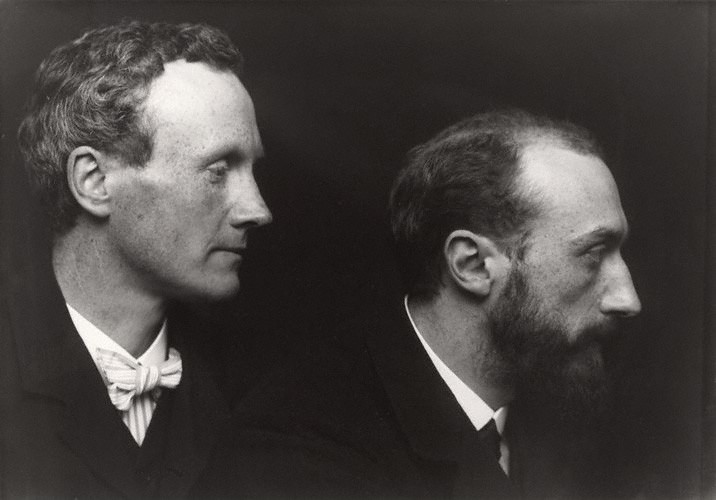
Charles Ricketts and Charles Haslewood Shannon (1903)

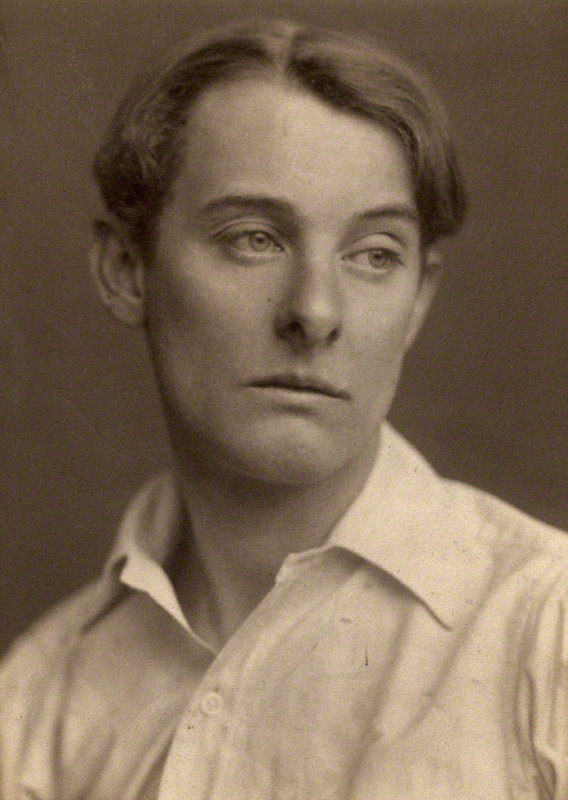
Lord Alfred Douglas (1903)

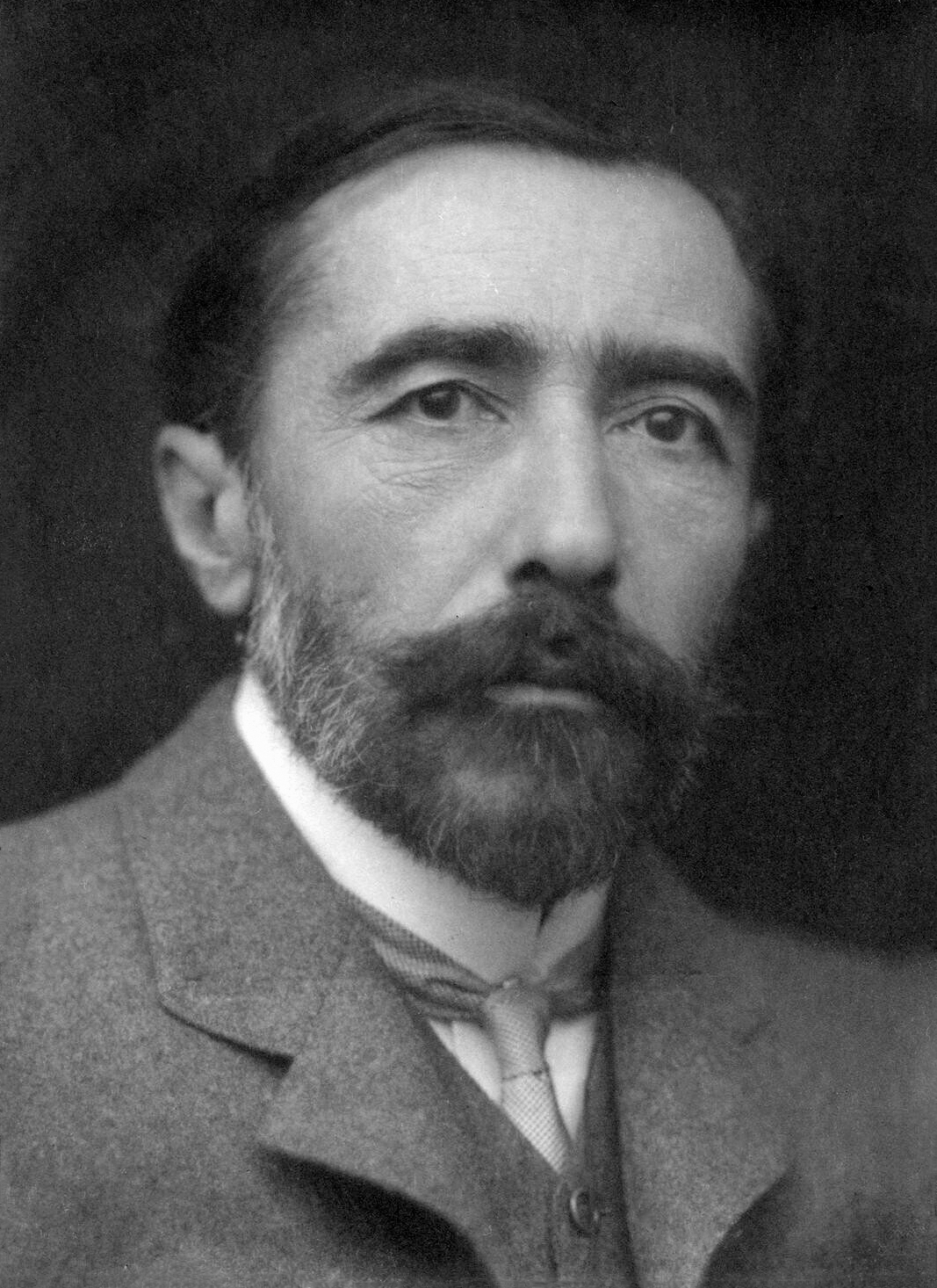
Joseph Conrad (1904)
