= George Shanks =

British translator (1896–1957)

George Shanks (1896–1957) was an expatriate Briton born in Moscow and was the first translator of Protocols of Zion from Russian into English. He was also a founding member of Radio Normandy.

George Shanks was the son of Henry Shanks, a well-known British merchant who resided in Moscow. Henry Shanks managed the family firm of Shanks & Bolin, Magasin Anglais established by his father James Steuart Shanks in 1852. As a result of the Russian Revolution of 1917, the family lost their business and home and were forced to return to London. It is believed that the translation was completed during this period in London. His identity was not discovered until 1978; initially, it was believed that Victor E. Marsden was the translator, as his name came to be associated with the British English language translation of the Protocols in pamphlet or booklet form soon after he died in 1920.

Shanks gave it a new fore-title The Jewish Peril. Shanks may have been assisted in the translation by Count Arthur Cherep-Spiridovich. The first edition was published by Eyre & Spottiswoode at the beginning of 1920. The second edition was produced for The Britons, an early anti-immigration and antisemitic organisation, at the end of that year. Shanks is known to have engaged in a dispute with The Britons over payment of the royalties to which he was entitled.

In an article published in Lord Alfred Douglas’s Plain English journal in January 1921 it is claimed that Shanks had been employed as a clerk at the Chief Whips Office at No. 12 Downing Street and then as Personal Assistant to Sir Philip Sassoon, the Personal Secretary to British Prime Minister, David Lloyd George. The Chief Whips Office would have been run at this time by Freddie Guest (for the Liberal Party) and Edmund FitzAlan-Howard, 1st Viscount FitzAlan of Derwent (for the Conservative Party). The British Government at this time was a coalition government. Although George is referred to as Edward in the article that was published on 22 January 1921, the editor printed a formal correction in an issue published the following month. A letter published in the journal on 5 February 1921 also revealed that George’s mother’s name was Schilling.

His First World War Service Records show that from 1915 to 1916 Shanks served as Sub-Lieutenant in the Royal Naval Air Service on Special Service with the Imperial Russian Navy at RNAS Kingnorth. On 20 December 1916 he was seconded to the Russian Government Committee under General Eduard K. Hermonius Boris Anrep at Canada and India House in Kingsway, London. He resigned his commission with the Royal Naval Air Service at his own request on 19 April 1919.

Louise Maude Shanks, George’s aunt on his father’s side, was married to Aylmer Maude. Aylmer and Louise Maude were friends and translators of the Russian novelist Leo Tolstoy. In October 1918, Aylmer was reported to have accepted an invitation by the British Government to assist in the anti-Bolshevik propaganda campaign at Arkhangelsk (Archangel) in North West Russia. He subsequently offered his services as Special Correspondent to the Manchester Guardian . Shanks’ Jewish Peril pamphlet was reviewed by The Times on 8 May 1920. A few days later, on 12 May, his uncle Aylmer Maude had a letter printed in The Times questioning its authenticity. At no point in his letter does Maude acknowledge the part played by his nephew George Shanks in the book's translation and publication.

That the Plain English article includes several personal details that would be verified by letters unearthed several decades later by historian, Gisela C, Lebzelter, lends additional weight to the claims. A letter written in response to the article by Patrick Hamilton in Tring in February 1921 suggests that it was unlikely that Shanks would have been able to complete the translation “unassisted”. The discovery of letters between Shanks’ friend, Robert Hobart Cust and H. A. Gwynne of The Morning Post confirms that Shanks was indeed assisted by Temporary Major Edward Griffiths George Burdon, who was awarded an O.B.E in the Queens Birthday Honours List in 1919. A supplement to the London Gazette of 21 August 1919 places him in the category of Special List officers of the General Service Corps. The Special List is a reference to officers who may have had ordnance, linguistic or intelligence skills. Upon his death in March 1937, Burdon left Shanks a sum £5,000 from his estate and a box of letters. According to a report printed in the Kington Times newspaper in August 1913, Burdon had expressed a wish that the letters should be sent to George Shanks “unopened so that he might deal with the contents according to instructions communicated to him”.

== Works ==
- The Jewish Peril: Protocols of the Learned Elders of Zion

anonymously translated by George Shanks
(London: Eyre & Spottiswoode, 1920; First edition)
(London: The Britons, 62 Oxford Street, 1920; Second edition)
Related name: Nilus, Sergei Aleksandrovich, 1862–1930 [1905 Russian source]

== Sources ==
- Sharman Kadish – Bolsheviks and British Jews: The Anglo-Jewish Community, Britain, and the Russian Revolution – (London: Frank Case, 1992)
- Robert Singerman – The American Career of the "Protocols of the Elders of Zion" – American Jewish History, Vol. 71 (1981), pp. 48–78
