= Aodh de Blácam =

Irish journalist (1891–1951)

- de Blácam, c. 1930
- Born: Harold Saunders Blackham; 16 December 1891; London, England
- Died: 16 January 1951 (aged 59)
- Occupations: Author, journalist, and editor
- Relatives: Robert J. Blackham (uncle); Henry Hamilton Blackham; Patrick MacCarvill (brother-in-law)
- Writing career
- Notable works: The Ship That Sailed Too Soon and Other Stories
- Movement: Irish nationalism

Harold Saunders Blackham (Irish: Aodh Sandrach de Blácam; 16 December 1891 – 16 January 1951) was an English-born Irish author, journalist, and editor. He was associated with 20th century Irish nationalism through movements such as Sinn Féin, Fianna Fáil and Clann na Poblachta.

== Biography ==
=== Early life ===
Harold Saunders Blackham was born in London, England; his father William George Blackham was an Ulster Protestant from Newry, while his mother was an Englishwoman named Evison Elizabeth Saunders. An uncle of his was Robert J. Blackham who was the Surgeon General to the British Army in Ireland. The Blackham family were evangelical Protestants, against which he rebelled; having been brought up to take the bible literally, Blackham suffered a religious crisis upon the realisation his teachers at school did not.

Blackham found the transition to adulthood difficult, particularly due to the early death of his father.

For a time Blackham moved in socialist circles, under the influence of Ulster socialist Robert Wilson Lynd. However, upon the discovery that his father had been a Protestant who had been in favour of Irish home rule and also had some republican sympathies, Blackham turned towards Irish Nationalism.

=== Irish nationalism ===
De Blácam became involved in the Gaelic League while in London. Blackham Gaelicized his name to Aodh Sandrach de Blácam or Hugh de Blácam, despite his non-Gaelic ethnic origin. He learnt the Irish language from the essayist Robert Wilson Lynd. During this time de Blácam sought to synthesize his urge to reclaim his sense of Irish nationality with the works and thoughts of hardline Catholic author G. K. Chesterton. It was partially because of Chesterton's influence that de Blácam converted to Catholicism, although the conversion of Protestant Irish Nationalists to Catholicism was common throughout the early 20th century. Another influence upon his decision to convert was his desire to marry Catholic Mary McCarville of County Monaghan.

In May 1914 de Blácam returned to Ireland and began working as a freelance journalist. He joined the Enniscorthy Echo as a journalist in 1915.

During the Irish War of Independence he wrote nationalist propaganda alongside Arthur Griffith and Herbert Moore Pim. He was interned by the British in 1919. During this time period de Blácam wrote two political manifestoes; Towards the Republic in 1919 and What Sinn Féin stands for in 1921. The two books argue that at their root, Catholic Social Teaching and Bolshevism are essentially identical and that Ireland, having only experienced Feudalism and Capitalism because of external forces, could skip many of the phrases normally described in the Marxist Trajectory of historical development and go straight to a soviet type society (an idea not dissimilar to the Two-stage theory). De Blácam imagined this soviet type society to be an Irish-speaking decentralised rural cooperative commonwealth. Critics of Sinn Féin frequently cited de Blácam's works as proof of the infeasibility of Sinn Féin's aims.

De Blácam opposed the Anglo-Irish Treaty and subsequently aided the Anti-Treaty IRA during the Irish Civil War. For this he was interned by the newly created Irish Free State in 1922. Following his release, de Blácam would continue to pin his flag to the mast of Éamon de Valera and his newly formed Fianna Fáil party. De Blácam believed De Valera fully embodied his own political ideas.

During the 1920s de Blácam joined The Irish Times, which he later left to become editor of the Catholic Standard. For 17 years he wrote a feature in the Fianna Fáil aligned Irish Press called Roddy the Rover.

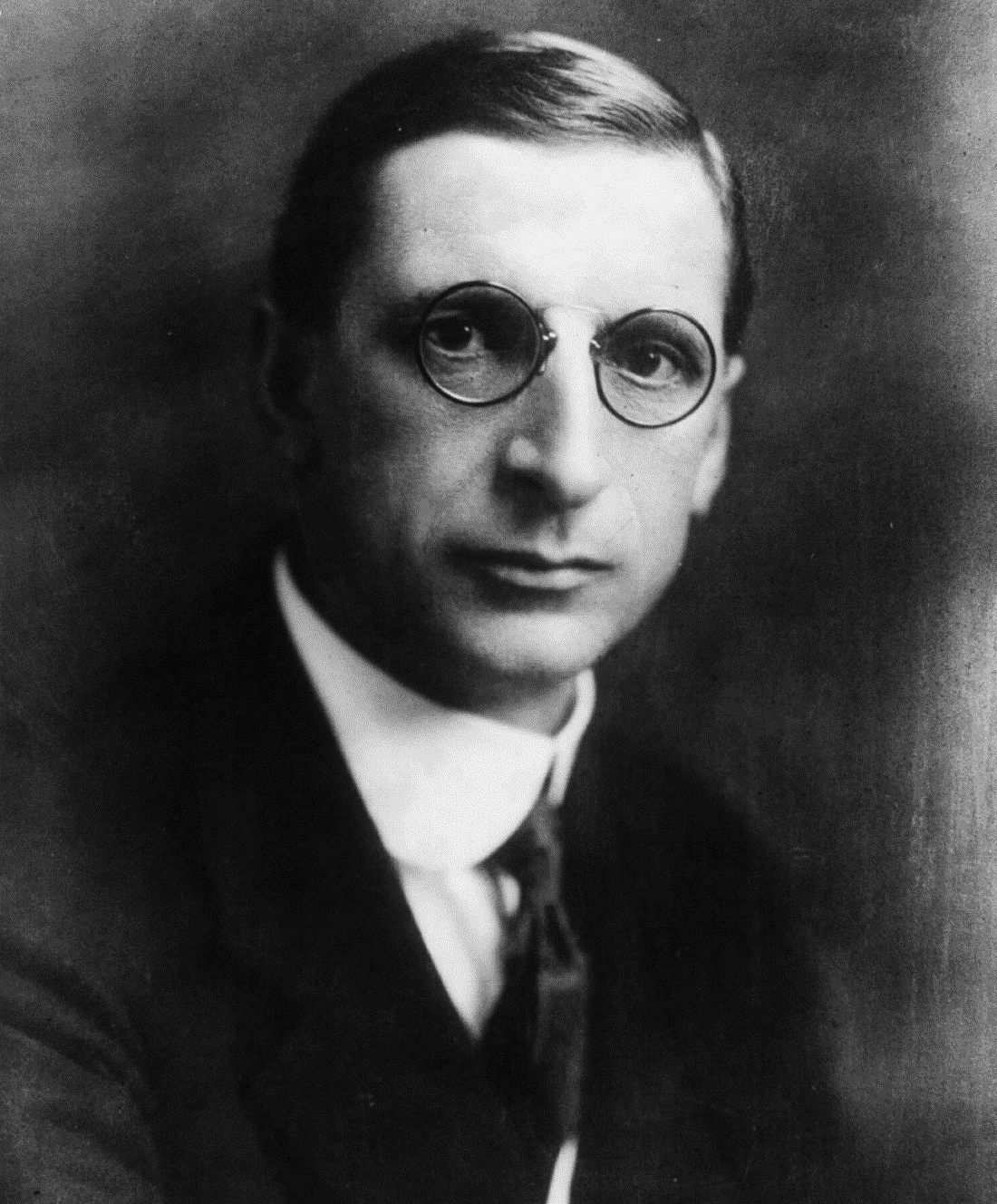
De Blácam was a high-ranking member of Fianna Fáil for 20 years and was particularly enamoured with the vision of Éamon de Valera for Ireland

It was also during the 1920s that de Blácam moved to Dublin, where he began to move in the same circles as George Bernard Shaw, George Russell, and W. B. Yeats. De Blácam hoped all three men might one day convert to Catholicism as he did, and as sorely disappointed when each did not. Upon the death of Yeats, de Blácam went so far as to refer to Yeats' poem as "Demonic". De Blácam had similar hopes for Peadar O'Donnell but was similarly disappointed in his lack of interest in conversion.

In 1938 de Blácam published The Black North, a book which carried an introduction by de Valera. In the book de Blácam argues that Ulster Protestants (Ulster Scots) are in actuality both Irish and Catholic, but they simply do not realise it. Amongst his arguments to support this idea are the suggestions that the presbyterian emphasis on self-government is derived from the Gaelic clan tradition, that presbyterian 'kailyard' writers of rural nostalgia such as Lydia Mary Foster exemplify the naturally Irish piety and purity of her co-religionists, and that the fact that some workers commuted from the Armagh borderland to work in Dundalk factories proved that the south was better off economically than the north.

It has been suggested de Blácam was an influence upon De Valera's 1943 (in)famous broadcast "The Ireland That We Dreamed Of", also known as the "dancing at the crossroads" broadcast. Politically de Blácam was highly considered about rural depopulation and was involved in a number of organisations seeking to end it. De Blácam advocated more economic autarky and cultural protectionism to combat rural depopulation and lamented urbanisation and industrialisation. De Blácam also tried to convince the Fianna Fáil executive that they should ban women from emigration as well as ban women from factories in order to force women to remain in rural Ireland. De Blácam's ideas failed to impress the executive, with Seán MacEntee in particular standing in strong disagreement.

De Blácam was a member of the Fianna Fáil executive until 1947, when he defected to the upstart Irish Republican party Clann na Poblachta. For this move he was immediately fired from the Irish Press. He stood for Clann na Poblachta in the Louth (Dáil constituency) constituency at the 1948 general election but was not elected.

During the brief period in which Clann na Poblachta was in government, de Blácam served as an official spokesman for the Department of Health and as a speech-writer to Noel Browne, the embattled Minister for Health.

De Blácam died while working in the Custom House on 16 January 1951. His funeral was attended by many dignitaries including Taoiseach John A. Costello and former Taoiseach Éamon de Valera. He was buried in New Mellifont Abbey, County Louth.

== Political views ==
For a while de Blácam was involved in socialist politics while under the influence of socialist Robert Wilson Lynd and after converting to Catholicism believed Ireland's social problems could be solved with the ideas of the papal encyclical Rerum novarum.

During the 1920s, de Blácam praised Benito Mussolini as an apostle of national renewal, although he criticised Mussolini for not being sufficiently Catholic. In the 1930s during his writing for Catholic periodicals, de Blácam frequently voiced his support for fascist regimes across Europe. He defended the dictatorships of Engelbert Dollfuss in Austria and António de Oliveira Salazar in Portugal as upholders of Catholic social teaching. During the Spanish Civil War, de Blácam was a vocal supporter of the Nationalist side and worked alongside Cardinal Joseph MacRory to organise aid for Franco. He also organised a boycott of publications that supported the Spanish republicans. De Blácam was later dismayed to learn that many of his Irish Republican friends supported the Spanish Republican side.

== Legacy ==
The journalist Michael Joseph McManus said of de Blácam:

Of the men and women with whom I have had an intimate acquaintance none had such a varied or striking array of talents as Aodh de Blácam. He was historian, novelist, playwright and poet.... As a journalist, he was the most versatile I have ever known and the most industrious. Only the most fluent of pens could have achieved his output which at times was breath-taking.

However, Historian Patrick Maume was less sympathetic, summarising that

De Blácam was a sincere seeker after religious faith and social justice, prepared to sacrifice his own interests for the sake of his beliefs; but the image of Ireland he propagated can only be described as delusional on an epic scale. While he was aware of the difference between the sunny Ireland celebrated by 'Roddy the Rover' and the society around him, he apparently convinced himself that the shortcomings of the real world could be made to disappear through silence and coercion. He is best summed up in the jibe of Sean O'Faolain that the most fervent Gaelic chauvinists were 'the Cunninghams" (a reference to Gearóid Ó Cuinneagáin) and Blackham)

== Personal life ==
De Blácam married Mary McCarville, who came from County Monaghan; they had two sons. De Blácam died 13 January 1951. One of his wife's brothers, Patrick MacCarvill, was active in the war of independence, and a Fianna Fáil TD.

== Bibliography ==
- Dornán Dán (1917)
- Towards the Republic: a study of new Ireland's social and political aims (1918)
- The Ship That Sailed Too Soon and Other Stories (1919)
- The Druid's Cave (1920)
- Songs and Satires (1920)
- Holy Romans: A Young Irishman's Story (1920)
- Sinn Féin and Socialism (1920)
- What Sinn Féin Stands For (1921)
- From a Gaelic Outpost (1921)
- The Story of Colmcille (1929)
- Gentle Ireland (1930)
- The Flying Cromlech (1930)
- The Lady of Cromlech (1930)
- The Bard of Clanrye (1932)
- Roddy the Rover and His Aunt Louisa (1933)
- A First Book of Irish Literature (1934)
- Old Wine: Verses from the Irish, Spanish and Latin Done Chiefly in Irish Metres (1934)
- The Story of Wolfe Tone: Set in a Picture of His Time (1935)
- For God and Spain: The Truth About the Spanish War (1936)
- The Black North. An Account of the Six Counties of Unrecovered Ireland (1938)
- Saint Patrick, Apostle of Ireland (1941)
- The Saints of Ireland: The Life-Stories of Ss. Brigid and Columcille (1942)
- Golden Priest: A Three-Act Drama on the Martyrdom of Blessed Oliver Plunkett (1943)
- O'Kelly's Kingdom (1943)
- Dhá rioghacht (1944)
- Ambassador of Christ: A Three-Act Drama of Saint Patrick (1945)
- St. John of God, 1495-1550 (1950)
