= William Frederick Harvey =

Scottish expert on public health

Lieutenant-Colonel William Frederick Harvey CIE FRCPE FRSE (1873 – 11 September 1948) was a Scottish expert on public health, serving for many years improving conditions in India.

== Life ==
Harvey, the son of Robert Harvey, attended Dollar Academy then studied medicine at the University of Edinburgh graduating MA in 1893 and MB in 1897.

In 1905/6 he received a Diploma in Public Health. He was a Fellow of the Royal College of Physicians of Edinburgh and a Licentiate of the Society of Apothecaries.

In 1907 he was posted to Sierra Leone to work on a cure for trypanosomiasis. From 1908 he was stationed in India with the Royal Army Medical Corps. As part of the Indian Medical Service he was based at Kasauli.

In the First World War he was initially based in Bombay, on training duties, then served with the Sanitary Division of the ADMS in Mesopotamia and was Mentioned in Dispatches. He was the joint creator, with Robert J. Blackham, of the "Harvey-Blackham" pattern used on St John's Ambulances in the Far East.

Returning again to India he served as Director of the Central Research Institute of India. He was awarded the Order of the Indian Empire in 1921. He retired from the Indian Medical Service in 1925 and returned to Scotland to live in Edinburgh.

In 1926 he was elected a Fellow of the Royal Society of Edinburgh. His proposers were Alexander Gray McKendrick, James Hartley Ashworth, Arthur Crichton Mitchell and David Waterston. He served as the Society's Vice President from 1946 to 1948. In 1936 he was elected a member of the Harveian Society of Edinburgh and in 1946 he was elected a member of the Aesculapian Club.

He died in Edinburgh on 11 September 1948.

== Publications ==
See

- Principal Diseases affecting Troops and Animals in Sierra Leone (1908)
- Bombay Presidency Branch of the Imperial Indian Relief Fund. War 1914-1915 (1915)

== Family ==
He was married to Jean Sutherland in 1910.
