= Lydia Mary Foster =

Irish writer and schoolteacher

- Born: 18 June 1867; Newmills, County Tyrone, Ireland
- Died: 13 December 1943 (aged 76); Hollowbridge House near Hillsborough, County Down
- Occupation(s): writer and teacher

Lydia Mary Foster (18 June 1867 – 13 December 1943) was an Irish writer and teacher, who wrote three books drawing on the experiences of growing up in rural Ulster in the 19th century in the Kailyard school genre.

== Life ==
Lydia Mary Foster was born on 18 June 1867 in Newmills, County Tyrone. She was the fourth of the six children of Presbyterian minister of Newmills congregation, James Foster, and Lydia (née Harkness). Foster had three brothers and two sisters. She was educated at home and was later sent to board at Miss Black's school in Holywood, County Down. Foster, with her sisters Jane and Bessie, moved to Belfast to establish a girls' school, the Ladies' Collegiate School, in the Balmoral suburbs, first at Myrtlefield Park, at 434 Lisburn Road, and then in Maryfield Park. This was after Bessie had graduated from Trinity College Dublin in 1896 having studied modern languages. Their school taught boys and girls, both day pupils and boarders. Foster and Jane taught music, and possibly other subjects as well. Their brother Henry, who worked in Belfast, lived with them. All four of the siblings attended the Malone Presbyterian Church and were members of the temperance movement. Throughout her life, Foster remained attached to Newmills, visiting regularly and laying the foundation stone for the new manse in 1910. Her brother, Nevin, was the only one of the six siblings to marry and was an Irish ornithological expert.

The school closed after the deaths of Bessie in December 1917 and Jane in October 1918. The death of Henry in December 1922 left Foster alone, and having lost her hearing almost completely, she was in difficult circumstances. To support herself, she began to write literary sketches and dialect verse for a number of publications such as the Northern Whig, Ireland's Own, and the annual miscellany Ulster Parade. A selection of these writings were published as a volume, Tyrone Among the Bushes, in 1933. Foster also wrote plays, but these were not collected or produced. She is best known for her three books which were set in rural Tyrone around the time of Foster's parents and her childhood. The books, The Bush that Burned (1931), Manse Larks (1936), and Elders' Daughters (1942) were published by Quota Press in Belfast and are seen as part of the Scottish Kailyard school genre of writing. The Bush that Burned details the story of a young man becoming a minister despite opposition, and was widely read in Ulster and beyond. Aodh de Blácam referenced the book as evidence that there was little difference between rural Ulster Protestants and their Catholic counterparts. Manse Larks recounts a rural childhood of six siblings growing up in the minister's house. Foster's fondness for animals is clear from the book, she was a supporter of the RSPCA, and her companion in later years was a dog named Stewart. Elders' daughters explores the experiences, romantic dreams and misadventures of young women subject to paternal authority in rural Tyrone.

As Foster's health declined and after the Belfast blitz of April 1941, she went to live with a married niece in Hollowbridge House near Hillsborough. It was to this niece that she dictated the last chapters of Elders' daughters. She died at Hollowbridge House on 13 December 1943. She is buried at Newmills Presbyterian Church, with her parents and siblings.
