= Henry Hamilton Blackham =

Irish–Australian writer, poet and pioneer (1817–1900)

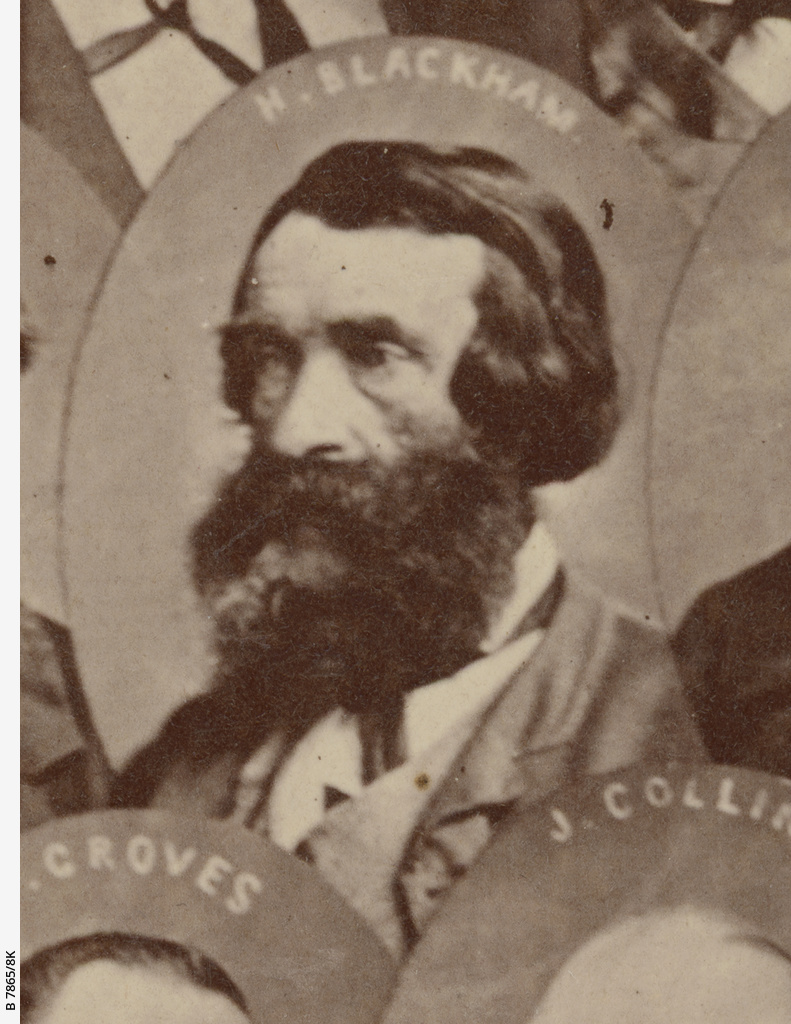
Henry Hamilton Blackham 1872

Henry Hamilton Blackham (14 January 1817 – 2 February 1900) was an Irish–Australian writer, poet and pioneer.

== Biography ==
Blackham was born in Newry, Ireland on 14 January 1817. In 1840, along with his parents Richard and Sarah and his five younger siblings, he emigrated to Australia. Travelling on board the Birman for 108 days they arrived in Port Adelaide. They settled in the One Tree Hill area of South Australia and purchased land for farming which they called Trevilla (this land is now called the Blackham Environmental and Conservation Centre, owned by Trinity College, Gawler). In 1851 Blackham married Elizabeth Kathleen Lynch, they had five children (Hannah, Richard, Henry, James and Desmond) and were both involved in building a local church and schoolhouse. Blackham was the uncle of Australian cricketer Jack Blackham.

== Writings ==
Blackham's poems were frequently featured in newspapers, magazines and anthologies of Australian poetry. His poetry featured various themes including homesickness, nature and travel. In the poem "Forsaken Homes and Graves" Blackham describes his thoughts while walking through the Australian countryside. It was published in Australian Ballads and Rhymes (London: W. Scott, 1888).

These mountains wilds that rest so still,
These woods and wastes so vast and deep,
Where long lost cattle roam at will
Beneath the eagle's ken and sweep..

Far from the Settlers' haunts are found
Rude vestiges of life and death,
Forsaken home and burial mound
Of those whose names still cling, around,
To circling wilderness and heath.

These olden walls, whose ruins low
Are met in many a lonely ride,
Deserted hearths whose fires did glow
With homelight in the long ago
By Ti-tree flat or gully side.

Round them the sheen of summers day
Falls drearisome and desolate;
Thin shadow lines of branches stray
O'er waifes of childhood's broken play,
Untrodden path and fallen gate.

The notes, of wild birds, that elsewhere
Bring tones of gladness, seem to change
To coronachs of sadness there;
The curlew's cry upon the air
sound like a shriek along the range..

..Once Life o'er Death hath made its moan;
There hath been sorrow even here;
In one small grave with weeds o'ergrown
A child sleeps in the wild alone,
With only silence crooning near.

..Here the night-zephyr, passing, wings
At midnight to that she-oak nigh,
Plays, harplike, on its drooping strings,
And to its dreary cadence sings
The wildwood's soothing lullaby.

Blackham wrote a popular novella set during the Irish Rebellion of 1798 called "Reminiscences of Father Looney" which was serialised in the South Australian magazine from 1841 to 1842. In 1932 Blackham's cousin Aodh de Blácam published a collection of his poems called Bard of Clanrye (Talbot press, Dublin 1932), this publication was financed by another of Blackham's cousins Robert J. Blackham. One poem featured in Bard of Clanrye called "Homeland" expresses Blackham's feelings of being so far away from the land he grew up in.

The autumn sunshine golden lay
Along the highlands of Iveagh,
When last I saw her winding shore
And stood, where I stood no more,
To bid a long and last good-bye
To boyhood's home and blue Clanrye..

..Ah! those were days, whose bygone light
Streams forth from morning's gates again:
Whose happy records I could write
On spotless page with golden pen:
And yet, an hour of parting came-
A sad farewell, a long good-bye-
While but the memory of a name,
The love-lights of an early flame,
Are all that's left of blue Clanrye!

== Death ==
Blackham died on 2 February 1900 and is buried in the cemetery at the One Tree Hill Wesleyan Church.
