= Robert J. Blackham =

British Army Major-General

Major-General Robert J. Blackham CB CMG CIE DSO
- Born: 15 September 1868; Newry, County Down, Ireland
- Died: 23 January 1951 (aged 82); Sussex, England
- Relatives: Aodh de Blácam (Nephew); Henry Hamilton Blackham (Cousin); Jack Blackham (Cousin); Blackham Baronets (Ancestors)
- Military career
- Allegiance: United Kingdom
- Branch: British Army
- Service years: 1895–1946
- Rank: Major-General
- Service number: 14347
- Unit: Royal Army Medical Corps
- Conflicts: Tirah Campaign; First World War: Battle of the Somme; Capture of Le Sars; Battle of Messines; Battle of Passchendaele
- Awards: Order of the Bath; Companion of the Order of the Indian Empire; Venerable Order of St John; Order of St Michael and St George; Distinguished Service Order; Kaisar-i-Hind Medal; Mentioned in Despatches (Five times); Légion d'honneur Croix de Guerre (Twice awarded); League of Mercy; Order of Saint Anna; Delhi Durbar Medal; British War Medal; Victory Medal; King George V Police Coronation Medal; 1914-15 Star

Major-General Robert James Blackham CB CMG CIE DSO (1868–1951) was a British barrister, medical doctor, writer, and officer in the Royal Army Medical Corps.

== Early life ==
Blackham was born in Newry on 15 September 1868, the son of Dr. William Semple Blackham and Susan Armstrong. He worked as an Apothecary's apprentice in The Medical Hall, Enniskillen and in 1886 as a doctors assistant in Letterkenny.

In 1887 he moved to the suburb of Rathmines in Dublin. He studied medicine in The Ledwich School of Medicine in Peter Street and took examinations in The Royal College of Surgeons in Ireland, qualifying in 1892. While studying in Dublin, Blackham worked as a Midwife for the Rotunda Hospital where he travelled the city by bicycle, delivering babies. He obtained a diploma of Midwifery from the Rotunda.

== Professional life ==
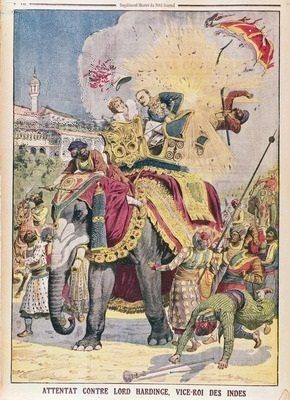
1912 assassination attempt on Lord Hardinge

=== Royal Army Medical Corps ===
Blackham served in the RAMC from 1895 until 1923 and again from 1939 to 1945. He entered service at Bulford Camp as Surgeon-Lieutenant 29 July 1895. While at Bulford Blackham studied obstetrics and gynaecology as well as general medicine. In order to gain promotion to the rank of Major he took an exam in the newly formed Army Medical College in London. He obtained 99 percent in the specialist examination.

=== India ===
From 1897 to 1899 Blackham served at the Tirah Campaign with the Khyber Brigade, Tirah Field Force. For another two years he toured the Punjab on 'plague duty' (1901-1902). He was made D.A.D.M.S of the First Division Indian Army.

Blackham's arrival in India in 1908 for his second tour coincided with an effort to revive interest in ambulance training. Along with William Frederick Harvey, he created the "Harvey-Blackham" standard pattern of St. John's ambulances in India. He was an experienced lecturer and examiner of the St John Ambulance Association and as an officer he was asked by Lord Kitchener to accept the position of honorary secretary.

In May 1911 Blackham obtained three months leave and left India to represent The India St. John Ambulance at The Coronation of King George V and Queen Mary. During this leave he also attended The Investiture of the Prince of Wales at Caernarfon Castle.

Blackham received the Distinguished Service Order for ministering to the Viceroy of India, Charles Hardinge, after an assassination attempt by Indian nationalists in 1912. A bomb was thrown at Hardinge's elephant and Blackham dressed the Viceroys wound in his Howdah. Following the event Blackham was put on the staff of the Viceroy as medical advisor and honorary surgeon (1912-1914). He was seconded for service with the Government of India from 14 November 1914 to 31 July 1915.

At King George V 1913 Birthday Honours Blackham was awarded - Companion of the Most Eminent Order of the Indian Empire for commanding the station hospital at Jutogh, Simla.

=== First World War ===
During the First World War, Blackham was stationed in India, France, Belgium, Italy and Northern Russia. He was D.A.D.M.S. with the 33rd Division, A.D.M.S. to the 2nd Cavalry Division, A.D.M.S. to the 23rd Division (France) and D.D.M.S. to the 9th Army Corps. He served at the Battle of the Somme and the Battle of Passchendale with the RAMC. He was promoted lieutenant-colonel in March 1915 and colonel on 26 December 1917. Towards the end of the war he became D.D.M.S of the 11th Corps. He wrote about his experiences in the army in his 1931 memoir Scalpel Sword and Stretcher.

Despite Blackham's very active military life during World War One, he found time to obtain further medical qualifications, he became F.R.F.P.S.Glas. in 1914, M.R.C.P.Ed. in 1916, and he proceeded M.D. N.U.I in 1918.

=== Irish Civil War ===
During the Irish Civil War (1922-1923) Blackham was posted in Dublin as Assistant Director of Medical Services. He also served as an assistant commissioner with St John Ambulance Ireland during this time.

=== Legal work ===
In 1903, Blackham joined the Middle Temple in London and passed the bar final examination without attending a single lecture. He was also a member of Gray's Inn. He was Called to the Bar by the Middle Temple in 1908.

On retiring from the army in 1923, Blackham practiced law in the chambers of Sir Travers Humphreys.

=== City of London ===
In 1925 Blackham was elected to the court of Common Council of the Corporation of London. In 1926 he became assistant commandant of the City of London Police Reserve and in 1927 he was appointed commandant. In 1927 he became clerk of the Worshipful Company of Glaziers and Painters of Glass, he was elected honorary assistant to that company in 1949. He also served as deputy-governor of The Honourable The Irish Society.

Blackham was a Freeman of the City of London and Liveryman of three of Londons Livery Companies, Apothecaries, Needle-makers and Glaziers. He was the first barrister to hold the office of Under-sheriff of the City of London (1935-1936), a position previously held only by solicitors. Blackham wrote about London's Livery Companies in his book 'The Soul of the City; London's Livery Companies'.

=== World War Two ===
At the outbreak of the Second World War, Blackham came out of retirement to serve on the Medical Personnel Priority Committee and he oversaw the care of soldiers in civilian hospitals. He was promoted to major-general in 1941 and retired again in 1945.

=== Awards ===
Blackham was highly decorated for his military services, receiving many awards, including the Croix de Guerre (twice awarded), Chevalier of the Legion of Honour, Distinguished Service Order, Kaisar-i-Hind Medal, Companion of the Order of the Indian Empire and special member of the Japanese Red Cross Society. He was five times Mentioned in Dispatches and made Companion of the Order of the Bath.

== Writings ==
Blackham was a prolific author writing over twenty books on many subjects including England's Royal Family, Indian Culture, Londons Livery Companies, A History of London, as well as many medical textbooks. In 1932 he financed the publication of a collection of poetry by his cousin Henry Hamilton Blackham (1817–1900) titled The Bard of Clanrye which was published by Robert's nephew Aodh de Blácam. At the outbreak of the Second World War in 1939 he wrote a first-aid guide for civilians called "Air Raid First Aid".

== Personal life ==
Blackham of London

Blackham was from an Anglo-Irish Protestant family. In his book 'London - Forever The Sovereign City' he stated that he was a descendant of the Blackham Baronets.

In 1897 Blackham married Charlotte Ellenora Mahoney in Twickenham, London 1897. They had a daughter Veronica Ellenora Blackham-(Butterfield) born in Umbala India (1900-1992). Charlotte died in 1949. He married Louise Irene Oliver that same year and she outlived him dying in 1976.

Blackham's nephew was the well known writer and journalist Aodh de Blácam (Harold Blackham).

=== Freemasonry ===
Blackham's mother lodge was the Aldershot Army and Navy Lodge No. 1971 where he was 'raised' in 1895.

In 1934 he published a book on the history of the Freemasons called 'Apron Men - The Romance of Freemasonry'. In the book he stated that he introduced the order of the Red Cross of Constantine to India.

Blackham was present at the initiation of King George VI into Mark Masonry and sat 'under his gavel' when the future King was Worshipful Master of the Grand Master's Mark Lodge.

== Death ==
Blackham died in his home Shortridge Farm, East Sussex on 23 January 1951, aged 82. His funeral was officiated by the Dean of Westminster Alan Don. He was cremated at Golders Green Crematorium.

== Books ==
- The Care of Children. Practical Hints for mothers and nurses at home and abroad (1906)
- The Midwives Pocket Register and Casebook (1907)
- Military Sanitation for Soldiers Serving in Hot Climates (1909)
- Aids to Tropical Hygiene (1912)
- Tropical hygiene for Anglo-Indians and Indians (1914)
- Indian Home Nursing (1915)
- The Indian Manual of First Aid (1915)
- Indian Ambulance Training (1915)
- The White Cross of Saint John (1918)
- Pocket Guide To First Aid (1920)
- Military Sanitation: A Handbook For Soldiers (1922)
- The Indian Manual Of First Aid (1926)
- A First Course In Hygiene (1928)
- Keep Fit! A Book For Boys (1929)
- Scalpel Sword and Stretcher (1931)
- 'The Soul of the City' London's Livery Companies (1931)
- London Forever the Sovereign City, its Romance, its Reality (1932)
- 'Incomparable India' Tradition Superstition Truth (1932)
- 'Wig and Gown' The Story of The Temple, Grey's and Lincoln's Inn (1932)
- Apron men: The Romance of Freemasonry (1934)
- Sir Ernest Wild KC (1935)
- Woman: In Honour and Dishonour (1936)
- 'The Crown and Kingdom' England's Royal Family (1938)
- Air Raid First Aid (1939)
- The Worshipful Company of Glaziers and Painters of Glass, and the Temple Church (1948)
