= Herbert Moore Pim =

Irish political eccentric and writer (1883–1950)

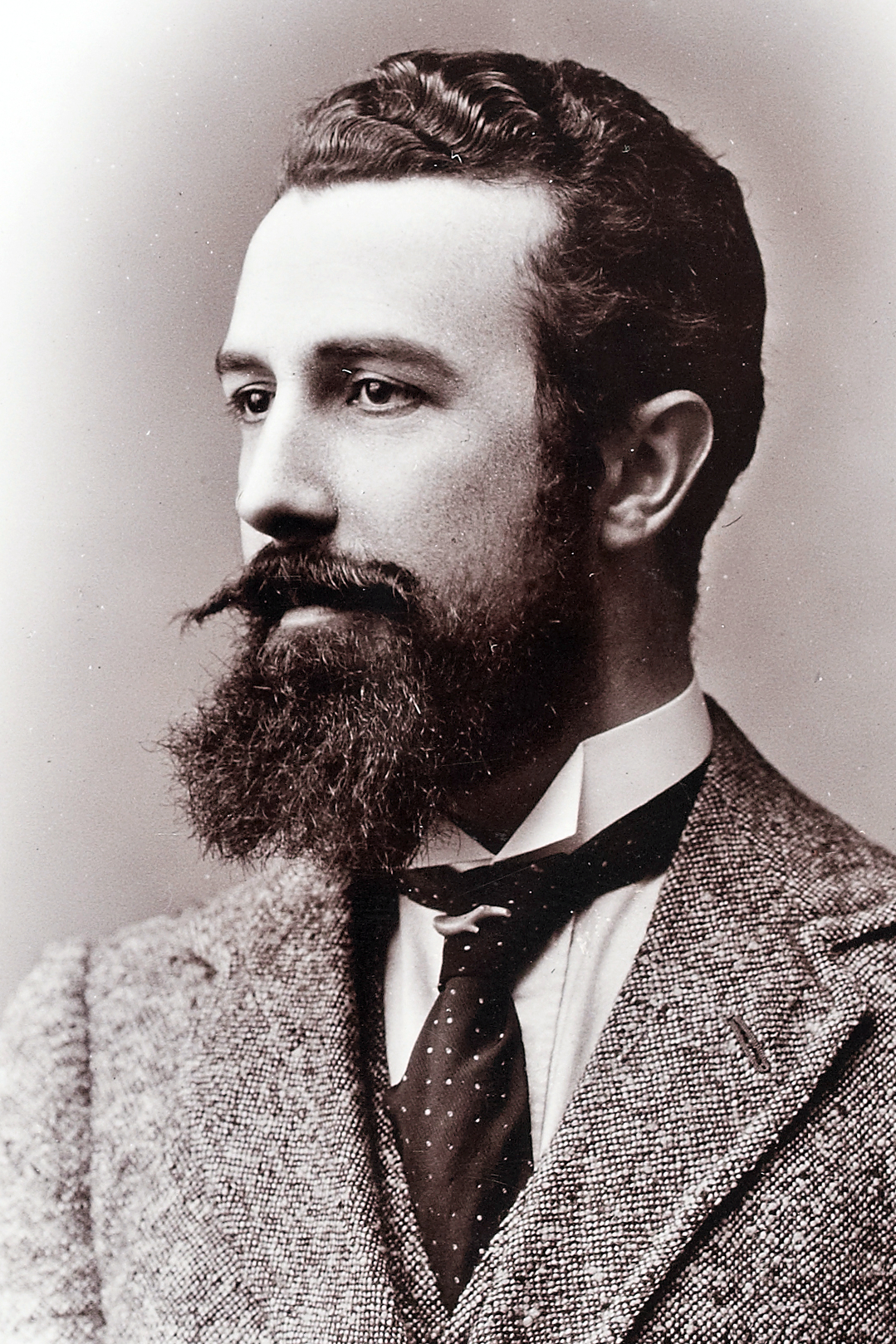
- Pim, c. 1910
- Born: June 6, 1883; Belfast
- Died: May 12, 1950 (aged 66); Sussex, England
- Occupations: writer; poet; political activist
- Spouses: Amy Vincent Mollan; Germaine Eleanor Dussotour

Herbert Moore Pim (June 6, 1883 – May 12, 1950) was an Irish writer, activist and bohemian who changed both political and religious allegiances multiple times during his lifetime.

== Biography ==
Pim was born to the Quaker family of Robert Barclay Pim and Caroline Pim (née Moore). His father Robert was the secretary of the Friends Provident Insurance Company. Pim was educated at Friends School, Lisburn before being sent to England to attend public schools in Chester and Bedford. Thereafter Pim spent four years studying in Grenoble and Paris in France. Pim came to deteste English schools and became a Francophile.

From the age of seventeen, Pim began circulating manuscripts of his poetry and short stories as well as developing an interest in the occult.

Following the completion of his education, Pim followed his father into the insurance business. In June 1903 Pim married Amy Vincent Mollan, the daughter of a Presbyterian linen merchant. In 1908 the two had a son by the name of Terence. However, Pim was repeatedly unfaithful during the marriage and by late 1916 the relationship was over.

== Irish Nationalist ==
Pim was initially politically conservative but became liberal after he became to mingle with upper-class Belfast liberals. From there though Pim began to become involved in the Irish Nationalism sweeping across the island at the time. Around 1910 Pim became involved in the United Irish League as well converted to Roman Catholicism. It was during this period that he also joined the Ancient Order of Hibernians. By 1914 Pim was a prominent organiser for the United Irish League as well as a frequent contributor to the Irish News under the pseudonym of ‘A. Newman’ (His penname signifying he had become "a new man" since his religious conversion).

It was also in 1914 that Pim published the novel The Pessimist, in which the central character hopes to end suffering via the extinction of all life on Earth.

Following the outbreak of World War I, Pim joined the Irish Volunteers, a move that signalled he was now openly an Irish nationalist and caused him to lose his job. He may have also joined the Irish Republican Brotherhood at this point. Regardless, Pim continued to write Irish nationalist pamphets; In 1915 he discussed the concept of a blood sacrifice in Why the martyrs of Manchester died (discussing the Manchester Martyrs of 1867) and The significance of Emmet (discussing Robert Emmet).

Pim was amongst four Irish separatists arrested and imprisoned in the period July to September 1915 for "seditious activities". Wasting no time, Pim published What it is like about his experience in jail.

From 1916 onwards, Pim was the main force behind The Irishman, a political monthly magazine published out of Belfast.

During the week of the Easter Rising Pim mustered with his group of Irish Volunteers in Coalisland, however, they like most other Volunteers outside of Dublin would likely have received orders from Eoin MacNeill to "stand down", and would not have been directly involved in the rising. Despite this, he was still arrested in the aftermath of the rising and sent to Reading Gaol in England. He was released in September 1916 and resumed his political activities, even going so as to claim to now be the de facto leader of Sinn Féin. Pim was not well regarded during this brief period of leadership within Sinn Féin; Arthur Griffith wrote to a friend regarding Pim during this time: "My well-meaning but feather-headed friend Herbert Pim seems to be muddling up Sinn Féin a bit. However we must trust in God to take him in hand and show him how to unmuddle it". Following the release of other Sinn Féin prisoners in December 1916, Pim quickly found himself politically marginalised and in no position to claim authority over the party.

For the next two years, Pim continued to write with politics in mind; he continued to work on the now weekly The Irishman. It was on the Irishman that Pim combined with Forrest Reid and Lord Alfred Douglas to combine pro-Sinn Féin propaganda with campaigns against sexual immorality. Pim's stance against "unclean literature" earned him the praise of Cardinal Michael Logue.

By early 1918 Pim's health was breaking down and the Dublin branch of Sinn Féin decided to take over the running of The Irishman. This apparently did not sit well with Pim, who resigned from Sinn Féin in June 1918 alongside his mistress Dorothy Hungerford.

== British Unionist ==
Pim's break from Sinn Féin resulted in a complete political about-face. Pim began advocating for Irish conscription during the Irish Conscription crisis of 1918, in which almost the entire population stood against it and despite the fact that he himself had stood against it in 1915. In 1919 he published Unconquerable Ulster, in which he claimed that Ulster unionists were of Gaelic descent while nationalists emerged from a pre-Celtic slave race. Pim began to offer his services to Ulster Unionists, but they turned him down, and so Pim departed for London.

Pim continued to work with Lord Alfred Douglas. Douglas had a new weekly entitled Plain English with himself as editor and Pim as assistant Editor. Plain English was described as "die-hard, anti-Sinn Féin, and anti-Semitic". Amongst the pages of Plain English Douglas and Pim alleged there was a German plot to corrupt the British upper classes using homosexuality. Pim also used the pages of Plain English to publish Adventures in the land of Sinn Féin, a memoir about his time in Sinn Féin which he used to self-aggrandise.

In 1920 Pim joined the far-right and anti-Semitic group "The Britons", which academics have pointed to as a forerunner of British fascism.

In 1921 Douglas and Pim created a new journal that acted as a successor to Plain English, this one entitled Plain Speech. In one edition of Plain Speech, Douglas and Pim made the accusation that Winston Churchill had manipulated war news to benefit Jewish conspirators. In response Churchill successfully sued Pim for libel, resulting in Pim's imprisonment for six months in 1923.

== France and Italy ==
Following his release from prison, Pim eventually made his way to France, where he would later obtain citizenship and marry Frenchwoman Germaine Eleanor Dussotour, with whom he had one daughter, Françoise, in 1930. In 1927 he had published the novel French love, which reimagined his own life as he would have liked it to have gone. The novel sees Pim portrayed as a gallant, devout Catholic and Ulster Unionist who spies on Germany during World War 1, while it casts his former wife Amy Mollan as a corrupt and degenerate pervert. The book would be banned in Ireland.

Thereafter Pim continued to produce poems and pamphlets (produced by a friend of Douglas, W. H. Sorley Brown) featuring extreme right-wing views. During the 1930s he relocated to Italy, where he dabbled in Italian Fascism.

== Final Years ==
By 1937 Pim relocated once again, this time to England in order to be close to his friend Lord Alfred Douglas in Sussex, England. It was there Pim died in 1950, aged 67. (Note: Dates of birth and death would indicate age 66 so there is a discrepancy here)

Aodh de Blácam, a fellow contributor to the Irishman and someone else whose politics swung extremely far to the right, was one of the few to commemorate Pim after his death, which in turn led to many letters to the editor criticise him for that. Cathal O'Shannon wrote an obituary for Pim in the Irish Times which summarised Pim as an "eccentric, buffoonish curiosity". Irish historian Michael Laffan recalled Pim's brief grasp of Sinn Féin leadership as "reflecting the vacuum or lack of talent available to radical nationalists" in that moment.

== Bibliography ==
A selection of his bibliography follows, some titles were written under the pen name A. Newman following his conversion to Catholicism:

- The Vampire of Souls. 1901.
- The Man with Thirty Lives. 1903.
- Newman, A. (1914). The Pessimist.
- —— (1917). Unknown Immortals.
- —— (1917). Selected Poems.
- A Short History of Celtic Philosophy. Dundalk, Edinburgh & London: W. Tempest Dundalgan Press and T. N. Foulis. 1920. OCLC 1084943092. OL 7899714W.
- French Love. 1927.

== Sources and further reading ==
- Brennan, Cathal (3 February 2012). "The Curious Career of Herbert Moore Pim". The Irish Story. Archived from the original on 10 February 2018.
