= Olive Custance =

English poet (1874–1944)

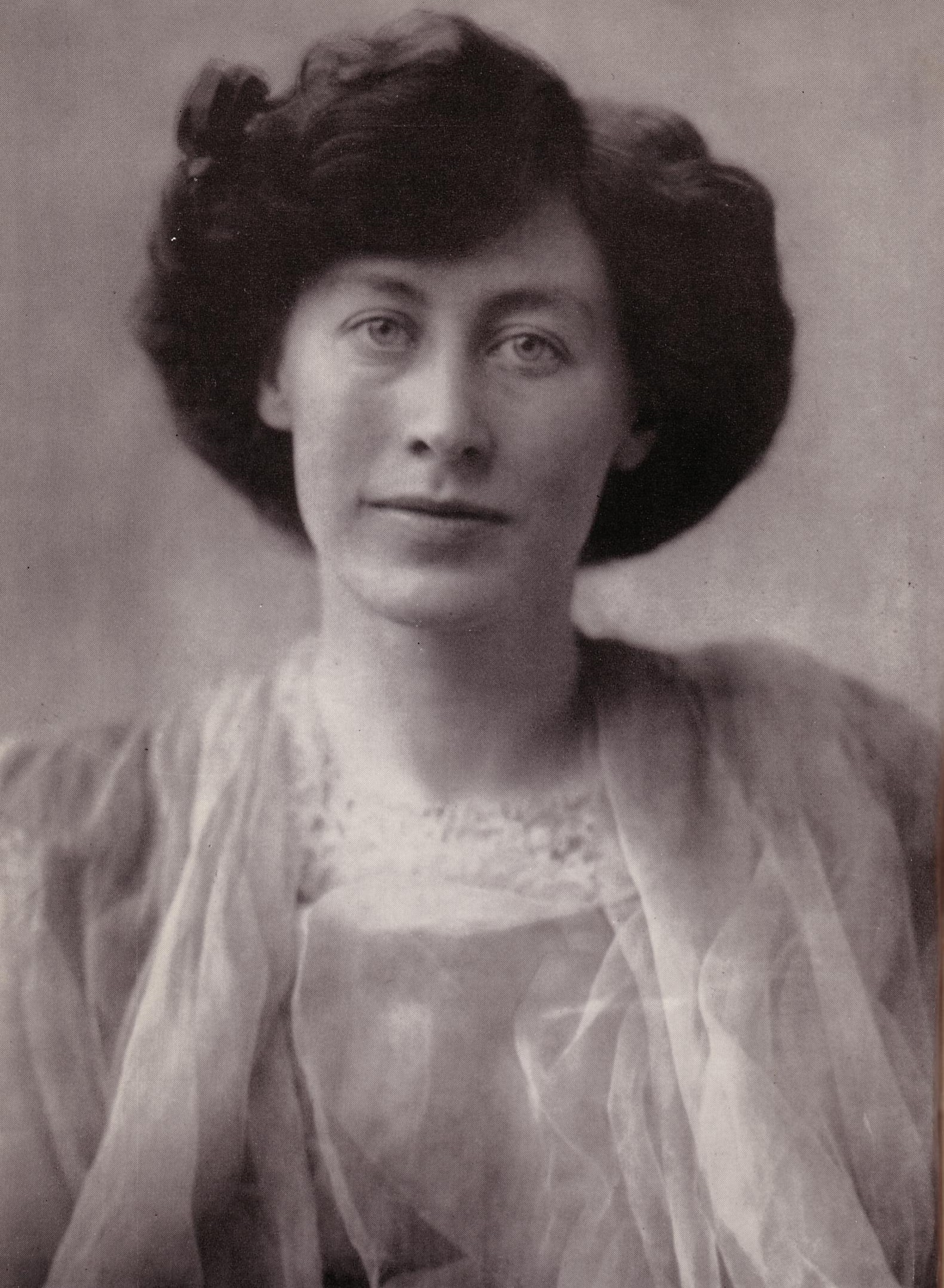
- Photograph by Beresford, 1902
- Born: Olive Eleanor Custance; 7 February 1874; London, England
- Died: 12 February 1944 (aged 70)
- Spouse: Lord Alfred Douglas (m. 1902)
- Children: 1
- Writing career
- Genre: Poetry
- Literary movement: Aestheticism

Olive Eleanor Custance (7 February 1874 – 12 February 1944), styled as Lady Alfred Douglas, was an English poet and wife of Lord Alfred Douglas. She was part of the aesthetic movement of the 1890s, and a contributor to The Yellow Book.

== Biography ==
She was born at 12 John Street, Berkeley Square, Mayfair, in London, the eldest daughter and heiress of Colonel Frederick Hambleton Custance, who was a wealthy and distinguished soldier in the British army. Custance spent much of her childhood at Weston Old Hall in Weston Longville in Norfolk, the family seat.

Custance joined the London literary circle around such figures as Oscar Wilde, Aubrey Beardsley, Ernest Dowson and poet John Gray in about 1890 when she was only 16. At this time she became infatuated with Gray and wrote some of her first poetry about him. Heavily influenced by French poets such as Verlaine and Rimbaud and by the decadent mood of that period, she quickly rose to prominence as a poet. In 1901 she became involved in a relationship with the overtly lesbian writer Natalie Clifford Barney in Paris, which Barney later described in her memoirs. Barney, and her lover at the time, Renée Vivien, were keen to win Custance as a partner, and indeed Custance remained on close terms with Barney for years. Custance and Barney exchanged love poems, including Custance's poems 'The White Witch'. Vivien's roman à clef A Woman Appeared to Me (1904) also recounts her brief relationship with Custance.

During her brief affair with Barney, Custance also instigated a courtship with Lord Alfred Douglas by writing to him admiringly in June 1901, six months after the death of Oscar Wilde. The two corresponded under the nicknames of the 'Prince' (for Douglas) and 'Princess' or 'Page' for Custance.

However, in late 1901, in an odd turn of events, Custance became engaged to George Montagu, who had been at school with Douglas. It was a short engagement because when Douglas returned from a trip to the USA (where, as he had written to her teasingly, he was looking for a rich heiress to marry) the two of them ran away and married on 4 March 1902. Custance's father did not approve of Douglas. They had one child, Raymond Wilfred Sholto Douglas, born on 17 November 1902. The marriage was stormy after Douglas became a Roman Catholic in 1911. They began to live apart in 1913, after the couple lost a custody battle for their only child to Custance's father.

In 1913 Douglas was charged with libeling his father-in-law who had always disapproved of him and seems to have been a major reason for strain on their marriage. The couple again lived together for a time in the 1920s after Olive also converted to Catholicism in 1917.

Their only child, Raymond, showed signs of instability in his youth. For a time he served in the army, but was confined to mental institutions for long periods. This placed further strain on the marriage, so that by the end of the 1920s they had separated again and Custance had given up her Catholicism. However, they did not divorce, and in 1932, she followed Douglas to Hove, taking a house near his. In the final 12 years of her life, they saw each other almost every day. In 1931 Douglas had already written that their marriage held firm despite "the welter of mud and stones" hurled at it by their enemies.

Custance continued to write and publish poems during the twentieth century. Many of these were published in journals edited by Douglas, including The Academy and the right-wing, anti-Semitic periodical Plain English. She also contributed poems to William Sorley Brown's newspaper the Border Standard. During World War II Custance wrote several patriotic poems but these have not been collected. She died on 12 February 1944 holding Lord Alfred Douglas' hand; Douglas himself died the next year, on 20 March 1945. Their son Raymond survived to the age of 61; after several lengthy episodes of mental instability throughout his lifetime, he died unmarried on 10 October 1964.

== Works ==
- Opals (1897)
- Rainbows (1902)
- The Blue Bird (1905)
- The Inn of Dreams (1911)
- The Inn of Dreams: Poems by Olive Custance (2015); edited by Edwin King
- The Selected Poems of Olive Custance (1995); edited by Brocard Sewell

Posthumous

- Olive Custance, I Desire the Moon: The Diary of Lady Alfred Douglas (Olive Custance) 1905-1910, ed. C. Wintermans (Avalon Press, 2005)

== Sources ==
- Olive Custance: Her Life and Work (1975) Brocard Sewell
- The Autobiography (1931) Lord Alfred Douglas
- Bosie (1963) Rupert Croft-Cooke
- The Lesbian Muse and Poetic Identity (2013) Sarah Parker
- Introduction to The Inn of Dreams: Poems by Olive Custance (2015); edited by Edwin King.
- Pulham, Patricia, 'Tinted and tainted love: the sculptural body in Olive Custance's poetry', The Yearbook of English Studies, Vol. 37, No. 1, 2007, 161-176
- Parker, Sarah, '"A Girl's Love": Lord Alfred Douglas as Homoerotic Muse in the Poetry of Olive Custance', Women: A Cultural Review, Volume 22, Issue 2–3, 2011, 220-240 https://www.tandfonline.com/doi/abs/10.1080/09574042.2011.585045
- Parker, Sarah, 'Olive Custance, Nostalgia, and Decadent Conservatism', Volupté: Interdisciplinary Journal of Decadence Studies, 2.1 'Women Writing Decadence' (Spring 2019), 57-81: http://journals.gold.ac.uk/index.php/volupte/article/view/574/701
