= Lord Alfred Douglas =

English poet and journalist (1870–1945)

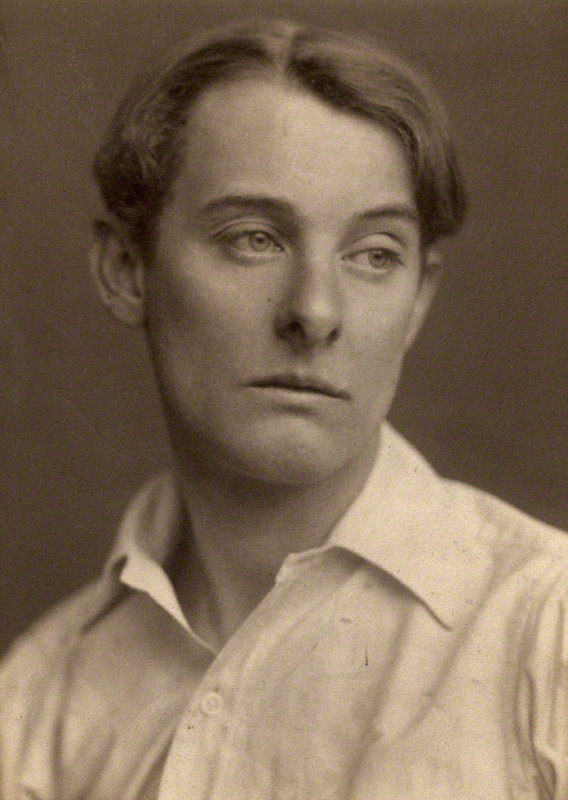
- Douglas in 1903 (by George Charles Beresford)
- Born: Lord Alfred Bruce Douglas; 22 October 1870; Powick, Worcestershire, England
- Died: 20 March 1945 (aged 74); Lancing, Sussex, England
- Resting place: Friary Church of St Francis and St Anthony, Crawley
- Citizenship: British
- Education: Winchester College; Wixenford School; Magdalen College, Oxford
- Occupation: Poet
- Spouse: Olive Custance (m. 1902; died 1944)
- Children: 1
- Parent: John Douglas, 9th Marquess of Queensberry

Lord Alfred Bruce Douglas (22 October 1870 – 20 March 1945), also known as Bosie Douglas, was an English poet and journalist, and a lover of Oscar Wilde.

At the University of Oxford, he edited an undergraduate journal, The Spirit Lamp, that carried a homoerotic subtext, and met Wilde, starting a close but stormy relationship. Douglas's father, John Douglas, 9th Marquess of Queensberry, abhorred it and set out to humiliate Wilde, publicly accusing him of homosexuality. Wilde sued him for criminal libel, but Queensberry produced witnesses who attested to the truth of his claim, and Wilde was later imprisoned. On his release, he briefly lived with Douglas, but they had separated by the time Wilde died in 1900. Douglas married the bisexual poet Olive Custance in 1902 and had a son, Raymond.

Douglas wrote several books of verse, some in a homoerotic Uranian genre. The phrase "The love that dare not speak its name" appears in one (Two Loves) published in 1894, and is often misattributed to Wilde.

After converting to Catholicism in 1911, he repudiated homosexuality, and, in Plain English, the magazine he founded in 1920, he expressed openly antisemitic views. He was jailed for libelling Winston Churchill over claims of misconduct in the First World War.

== Early life and background ==
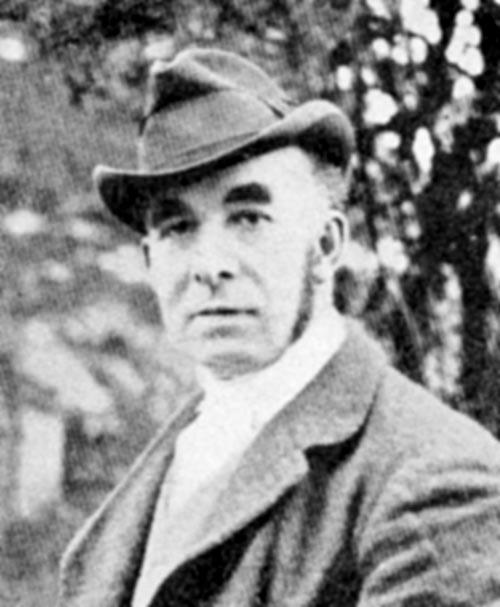
His father, the 9th Marquess of Queensberry

Douglas was born at Queensberry House (Ham Hill House) in Powick, Worcestershire, the third son of John Douglas, 9th Marquess of Queensberry, and his first wife, Sibyl Montgomery. He was born on 22 October 1870.

His nickname derived from his mother's habit of calling him "Boysie", a West Country diminutive meaning "little boy", which was eventually shortened to "Bosie." This was a nickname which stuck for the rest of his life. His mother successfully sued for divorce in 1887 on the grounds of his father's adultery. The Marquess later married Ethel Weeden in 1893, but the marriage was annulled the following year.

Douglas was educated at Wixenford School, Winchester College (1884–88) and Magdalen College, Oxford (1889–93), which he left without obtaining a degree. At Oxford, he edited an undergraduate journal, The Spirit Lamp (1892–93), an activity that intensified the constant conflict between him and his father. Their relationship had always been strained, and during the Queensberry–Wilde feud, Douglas sided with Wilde, even encouraging Wilde to prosecute the Marquess for libel. In 1893, Douglas had a brief affair with George Cecil Ives.

In 1858, his grandfather, Archibald Douglas, 8th Marquess of Queensberry, had died in what was reported as a shooting accident, but was widely believed to have been suicide. In 1862, his widowed grandmother, Lady Queensberry, converted to Catholicism and took her children to live in Paris. One of his uncles, Lord James Douglas, was deeply attached to his twin sister "Florrie" (Lady Florence Douglas) and was heartbroken when she married a baronet, Sir Alexander Beaumont Churchill Dixie. In 1885, Lord James tried to abduct a young girl, and after that, he became ever more manic; in 1888, he made a disastrous marriage. Separated from Florrie, James drank himself into a deep depression, and in 1891 committed suicide by cutting his throat. Another of his uncles, Lord Francis Douglas (1847–1865), had died in a climbing accident on the Matterhorn. His uncle, Lord Archibald Edward Douglas (1850–1938), became a clergyman. Alfred Douglas's aunt, Lord James's twin Lady Florence Dixie (1855–1905), was an author, war correspondent for the Morning Post during the First Boer War, and a feminist. In 1890, she published a novel, Gloriana, or the Revolution of 1900, in which women's suffrage is achieved after a woman posing as a man named Hector D'Estrange is elected to the House of Commons. Some scholars have suggested that the character D'Estrange is based on Oscar Wilde.

== Relationship with Wilde ==
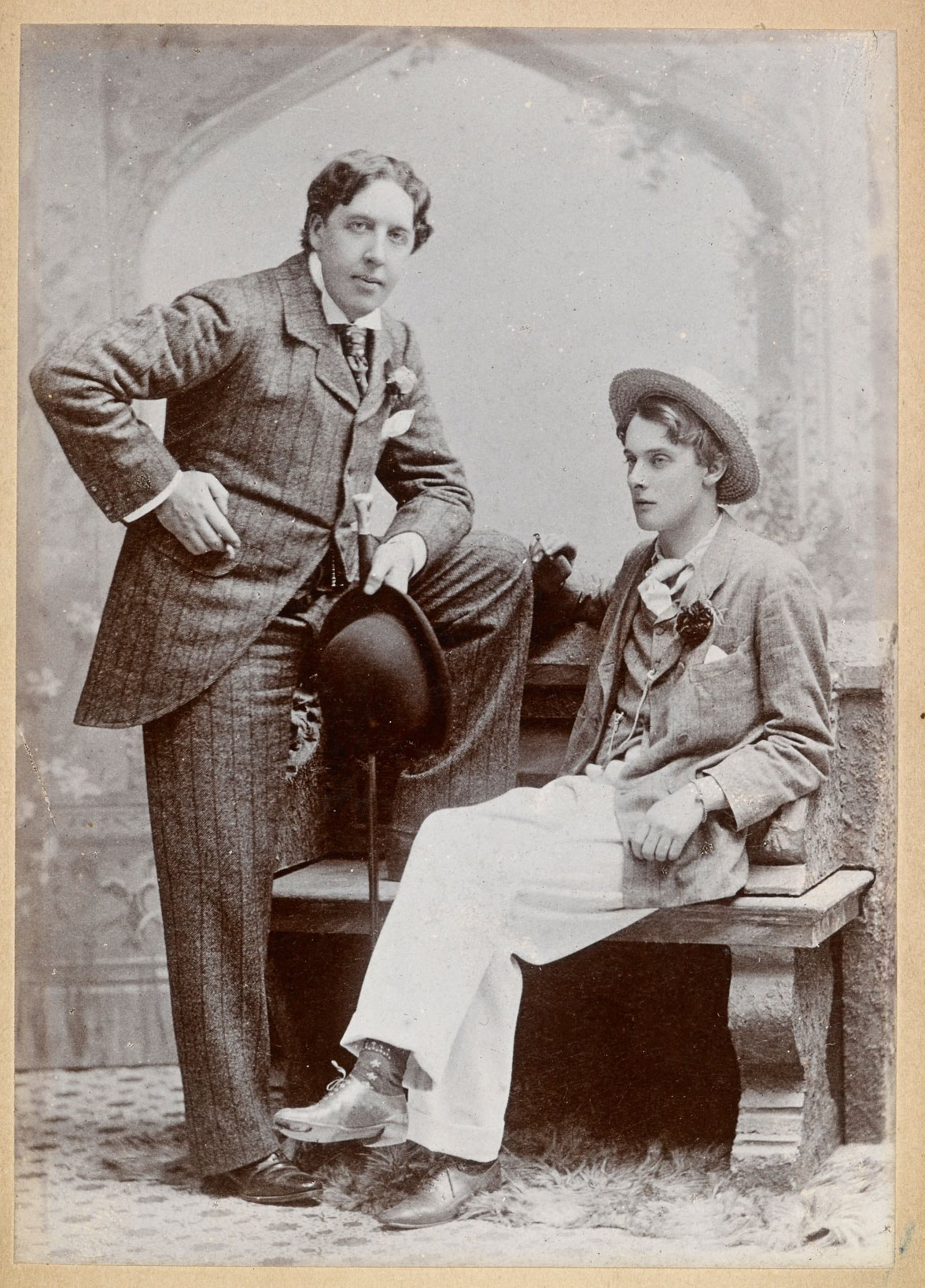
Oscar Wilde and Lord Alfred Douglas, May 1893

In 1891, Lionel Johnson brought Douglas to the home of Oscar Wilde in Tite Street, Chelsea, for afternoon tea. Wilde took an interest in Douglas but it was six months before they became intimate and their affair began. In 1894, the Robert Hichens novel The Green Carnation was published, a roman à clef satirically depicting Douglas's dependent relationship on Wilde.

Douglas has been described as spoiled, reckless, insolent and extravagant. He would spend money on boys and gambling, expecting Wilde to contribute to funding his tastes. They often argued and broke up, but would usually be reconciled.

Douglas had praised Wilde's play Salome in the Oxford magazine The Spirit Lamp, of which he was editor. Wilde had originally written Salome in French, and in 1893 he commissioned Douglas to translate it into English. Douglas's French was very poor and his translation was highly criticised; for example, a passage that runs "On ne doit regarder que dans les miroirs" ("One should look only in mirrors") he rendered "One must not look at mirrors". Douglas was angered at Wilde's criticism, and claimed that the errors were in fact in Wilde's original play. This led to a hiatus in the relationship and a row between the two, with angry messages being exchanged and even the involvement of the publisher John Lane and the illustrator Aubrey Beardsley when they themselves objected to the poor standard of Douglas's work. Beardsley complained to Robbie Ross: "For one week the numbers of telegraph and messenger boys who came to the door was simply scandalous". Wilde redid much of the translation himself, but in a gesture of reconciliation suggested that Douglas be dedicated as the translator rather than be credited, along with him, on the title page. Accepting this, Douglas, likened the difference between sharing the title page and having a dedication to "the difference between a tribute of admiration from an artist and a receipt from a tradesman".

In 1894, Douglas came and visited Wilde in Worthing, to the consternation of the latter's wife Constance.

On another occasion, while staying with Wilde in Brighton, Douglas fell ill with influenza and was nursed by Wilde, but failed to return the favour when Wilde himself fell ill having caught influenza in consequence. Instead Douglas moved to the luxurious Grand Hotel and on Wilde's 40th birthday sent him a letter informing him that he had charged Wilde with the hotel bill. Douglas also gave his old clothes to male prostitutes, but failed to remove from the pockets incriminating letters exchanged between him and Wilde, which were then used for blackmail.

Douglas's eldest brother Francis Viscount Drumlanrig died in a suspicious hunting accident in October 1894, as rumours circulated that he had been having a homosexual relationship with the future Prime Minister, Lord Rosebery, and that the cause of death was suicide. The Marquess of Queensberry thus embarked on a campaign to save his other son and began a public persecution of Wilde. Wilde had been openly flamboyant and his actions made the public suspicious even before the trial. The Marquess and a bodyguard confronted Wilde in Wilde's home; later, Queensberry planned to throw rotten vegetables at Wilde on the first night of The Importance of Being Earnest, but forewarned of this, Wilde was able to deny him access to the theatre.

== 1895 trials ==
With Douglas's avid support, but against the advice of friends such as Robbie Ross, Frank Harris and George Bernard Shaw, Wilde had Queensberry arrested and charged with criminal libel in a private prosecution, as sodomy was then a criminal offence. According to the libel laws of the time, since his authorship of the charge of sodomy was not in question, Queensberry could avoid conviction by demonstrating in court not only that the charge he had made was true but also that there was a public interest in having made the charge public. Edward Carson, Queensberry's lawyer, portrayed Wilde as a vicious older man who preyed upon naive young boys and with extravagant gifts and promises of a glamorous lifestyle seduced them into a life of homosexuality. Several highly suggestive erotic letters that Wilde had written to Douglas were introduced as evidence; Wilde claimed they were works of art. Wilde was questioned closely on the homoerotic themes in The Picture of Dorian Gray and The Chameleon, a single-issue magazine published by Douglas to which Wilde had contributed "Phrases and Philosophies for Use of the Young".

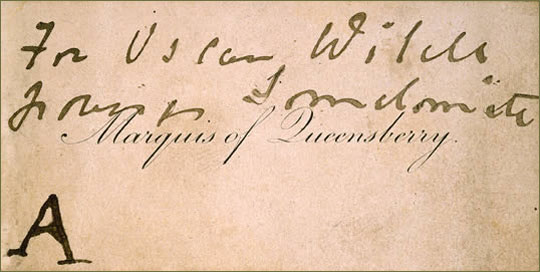
The calling card, labelled Exhibit A in the trial (bottom left corner)

Queensberry's attorney announced in court that he had located several male prostitutes who were to testify that they had had sex with Wilde. Wilde's lawyers advised him that this would make a conviction on the libel charge very unlikely; he then dropped the libel charge, on his lawyers' advice, to avoid further pointless scandal. Without a conviction, the libel law of the time meant that Wilde was responsible for Queensberry's considerable legal costs which, along with other debts, left him bankrupt. Based on the evidence raised during the case, Wilde was arrested the next day and charged with committing criminal sodomy and "gross indecency", a crime capable of being committed only by two men, which might include sexual acts other than sodomy.

Douglas's September 1892 poem "Two Loves" (published in the Oxford magazine The Chameleon in December 1894) was used against Wilde at the latter's trial. It ends with the famous line that refers to male homosexuality as the love that dare not speak its name, which is often attributed wrongly to Wilde. Wilde gave an eloquent but counter-productive explanation of the nature of this love on the witness stand. The trial resulted in a hung jury.

In 1895, when Wilde was released on bail during his trials, Douglas's cousin Sholto Johnstone Douglas stood surety for £500 of the bail money. The prosecutor opted to retry the case. Wilde was convicted on 25 May 1895 and sentenced to two years' hard labour, first at Pentonville, then Wandsworth, then famously in Reading Gaol. Douglas was forced into exile in Europe.

While in prison, Wilde wrote Douglas a long and critical letter titled De Profundis, describing how he felt about him. Wilde was not permitted to send it but it might have been sent to Douglas after Wilde's release. It was given to Robbie Ross with instructions to make a copy and send the original to Douglas. Douglas later said that he received only a letter from Ross with a few choice quotations and did not know there was a letter from Wilde until reference was made to it in a biography of Wilde on which Ross had consulted. After Wilde's release on 19 May 1897, the two reunited in August at Rouen but stayed together only a few months due to personal differences and various pressures on them.

== Italy and Paris ==
The meeting in Rouen was disapproved of by the friends and families of both men. During the later part of 1897, Wilde and Douglas lived together in Italy, but they separated due to financial pressures and for other personal reasons. Wilde spent the rest of his life mainly in Paris; Douglas returned to Britain in late 1898. The cohabitation period in Naples later became controversial. Wilde claimed Douglas had offered a home, but had no funds or ideas. When Douglas eventually gained funds from his late father's estate, he refused to grant Wilde a permanent allowance, although he gave him occasional sums. Wilde was still bankrupt when he died in 1900. Douglas served as chief mourner, but there was reportedly a graveside altercation between him and Robbie Ross that developed into a feud and foreshadowed the later litigation between the two former lovers of Wilde.

== Marriage ==
Lady Alfred Douglas

After Wilde's death, Douglas made a close friendship with Olive Custance, a bisexual heiress and poet. They married on 4 March 1902. Olive Custance was in a relationship with the writer Natalie Barney when she and Douglas first met. Barney and Douglas eventually became close friends and Barney was named godmother to their son, Raymond Wilfred Sholto Douglas, born on 17 November 1902.

The marriage grew stormy after Douglas became a Catholic in 1911. They separated in 1913, lived together for a time in the 1920s after Custance also converted, and then lived apart after she gave up her Catholicism. The health of their only child further strained the marriage, which by the end of the 1920s was all but over, although they never divorced.

== Repudiation of Wilde ==
In 1911, Douglas embraced Catholicism as Wilde had done earlier. More than a decade after Wilde's death, with the release of suppressed portions of Wilde's De Profundis letter in 1912, Douglas turned against his former friend, whose homosexuality he grew to condemn. He was a defence witness in the libel case brought by Maud Allan against Noel Pemberton Billing in 1918. Billing had accused Allan, who was performing Wilde's play Salome, of being part of a deliberate homosexual conspiracy to undermine the war effort.

Douglas also contributed to Billing's journal Vigilante as part of his campaign against Robbie Ross. He had written a poem calling Margot Asquith one "bound with Lesbian fillets", while her husband Prime Minister Herbert Asquith gave Ross money. During the trial he described Wilde as "the greatest force for evil that has appeared in Europe during the last three hundred and fifty years", adding that he intensely regretted having met Wilde and helped him with the English translation of Salome (written by Wilde in French), which he called "a most pernicious and abominable piece of work".

== Plain English ==
In 1920 Douglas founded a right-wing, Catholic, and deeply antisemitic weekly magazine called Plain English, in which he collaborated with Harold Sherwood Spencer and initially Thomas William Hodgson Crosland. It claimed to succeed The Academy, to which Douglas had been a contributing editor. Plain English had a brief run, ending in 1922. Douglas later admitted that its editorial policy was "strongly anti-Semitic".

From August 1920 (issue no. 8) Plain English began publishing a long series of articles called "The Jewish Peril", by Major-General Count Cherep-Spiridovitch, whose title was taken from the fore-title of George Shanks's version of a fraudulent work, The Protocols of the Elders of Zion. Plain English advertised from issue 20 The Britons' second edition of Shank's version of the Protocols. Douglas challenged the Jewish Guardian, published by the League of British Jews, to take him to court, suggesting they refrained from doing so because they were "well aware of the absolute truth of the allegations which we have made." The magazine suggested in 1921, "We need a Ku Klux Klan in this country," but a promotion for Ostara magazine was generally not well received by readers.

From 25 December 1920 it began publishing notorious articles alleging that a "powerful individual in the Admiralty" had alerted the Germans at the Battle of Jutland that the British had broken their code, and that Winston Churchill had falsified a report in return for a large sum of money from Ernest Cassel, who thereby profited. In May 1921 Douglas insinuated that Lord Kitchener had been murdered by Jews.

Douglas ceased to be editor after issue 67 in 1921, after a row with Spencer. He then produced a short-lived, almost identical rival called Plain Speech in 1921 with Herbert Moore Pim. Its first issue contained a letter from a correspondent in Germany praising "Herr Hittler" (so spelt) and "The German White Labour Party".

In 1920 he adhered to the idea of "the Jewish Peril", but noted, "Christian Charity forbids us to join in wholesale and indiscriminate abuse and vilification of an entire race." In 1921 he declared it was not acceptable to "shift responsibility" onto the Jews. In his 1929 Autobiography he wrote, "I feel now that it is ridiculous to make accusations against the Jews, attributing them qualities and methods which are really much more typically English than Jewish," and then indicated the country had only itself to blame if the Jews came in and trampled on it.

The historian Colin Holmes argued that while "Douglas had been to the forefront of anti-semitism in the early 1920s, he was quite unable to come to terms with the vicious racist anti-semitism in Germany" under the Nazis. Politically Douglas described himself as "a strong Conservative of the 'Diehard' variety".

== Libel actions ==
Douglas started his "litigious and libellous career" by gaining an apology and 50 guineas each from the Oxford and Cambridge university magazines Isis and Cambridge for defamatory references to him in an article on Wilde.

Douglas was plaintiff or defendant in several trials for civil or criminal libel. In 1913 he was charged with libelling his father-in-law. That same year he accused Arthur Ransome of libelling him in his book Oscar Wilde: A Critical Study. He saw the trial as a weapon against his enemy Ross, not understanding that Ross would not be called to give evidence. The court found in Ransome's favour and Douglas was bankrupted by the failed libel suit. Ransome removed the offending passages from the second edition.

The prime case was brought by the Crown on Winston Churchill's behalf in 1923. Douglas was found guilty of libelling Churchill and sentenced to six months in prison. Churchill had been accused as cabinet minister of falsifying an official report on the Battle of Jutland in 1916, when although suffering losses, the Royal Navy drove the German battle fleet off the high seas. Churchill was said to have reported that the British Navy had in fact been defeated, the supposed motive being that when the news was flashed, British security prices would tumble on the world's stock exchanges, allowing a group of named Jewish financiers to snap them up cheaply; Churchill's alleged reward was a houseful of furniture valued at £40,000. The allegations were made by Douglas in Plain English and later at a public meeting in London. A false report of a crushing British naval defeat had indeed been planted in the New York press by German interests, but by this time (after the failure of his Dardanelles Campaign) Churchill was unconnected with the Admiralty. As the attorney general noted in court on Churchill's behalf, there was "no plot, no phoney communiqué, no stock market raid and no present of fine furniture".

In 1924, while in prison, Douglas echoed Wilde's composition of De Profundis (From the Depths) during his incarceration and wrote his last major poetic work, In Excelsis (In the Highest) in 17 cantos. Since the prison authorities would not allow Douglas to take the manuscript with him on his release, he had to rewrite the work from memory.

== Later life ==
Douglas's feelings towards Wilde began to soften after Douglas's own incarceration in 1924. He wrote in Oscar Wilde: A Summing Up, "Sometimes a sin is also a crime (for example, a murder or theft), but this is not the case with homosexuality, any more than with adultery." In 1933 he gave a talk about poetry to the Catholic Poetry Society on 'The Catholic attitude to certain poets.' Of Wilde, Douglas said: 'Many years [after Wilde's death] and after I had become a Catholic, I reacted violently against him...Converts are very apt to be censorious and to be more Catholic than Catholics...I hope I am now more charitable and broad-minded than I was...After swinging to two extremes in my estimate of Wilde I have now got into what I believe to be the happy mean.' Similarly, in 1935 he wrote to the theatre manager Norman Marshall regarding Marshall's proposed production of a play about the Wilde scandal, closing his letter, 'Devoted as I still am and always will be to the memory of this brilliant and wonderful man and conscious as I am and always shall be about my own failings...Wilde was the author of what I consider to be, apart from Shakespeare, the finest comedy in the English language.'

Throughout the 1930s and up to his death, Douglas kept up correspondence with many people, including Marie Stopes and George Bernard Shaw. Anthony Wynn based his play Bernard and Bosie: A Most Unlikely Friendship on the letters between Shaw and Douglas. One of Douglas's final public appearances was a well-received lecture to the Royal Society of Literature on 2 September 1943 on The Principles of Poetry, published in an edition of 1,000 copies. He attacked the poetry of T. S. Eliot; the talk was praised by Arthur Quiller-Couch and Augustus John.

Harold Nicolson described his impression of Douglas after meeting him at a lunch party in 1936:

There is a little trace of his good looks left. His nose has assumed a curious beaklike shape, his mouth has twisted into shapes of nervous irritability, and his eyes, although still blue, are yellow and bloodshot. He makes nervous and twitching movements with freckled and claw-like hands. He stoops slightly and drags a leg. Yet behind this appearance of a little, cross, old gentleman flits the shape of a young man of the 'nineties, with little pathetic sunshine-flashes of the 1893 boyishness and gaiety. I had fully expected the self-pity, suspicion and implied irritability, but I had not foreseen that there would be any remnant of merriment and boyishness. Obviously the great tragedy of his life has scarred him deeply. He talked very frankly about his marriage and about his son, who is in a home at Northampton.

Douglas's only child, Raymond, was diagnosed in 1927, at the age of 24, with schizoaffective disorder and entered St Andrew's Hospital, a mental institution. Though decertified and discharged after five years, he suffered another breakdown and returned to the hospital. In February 1944, when his mother died of a cerebral haemorrhage at the age of 70, Raymond was able to attend her funeral, and in June he was again decertified. His conduct rapidly deteriorated, and in November he again returned to St Andrew's, where he stayed until his death on 10 October 1964.

== Death ==
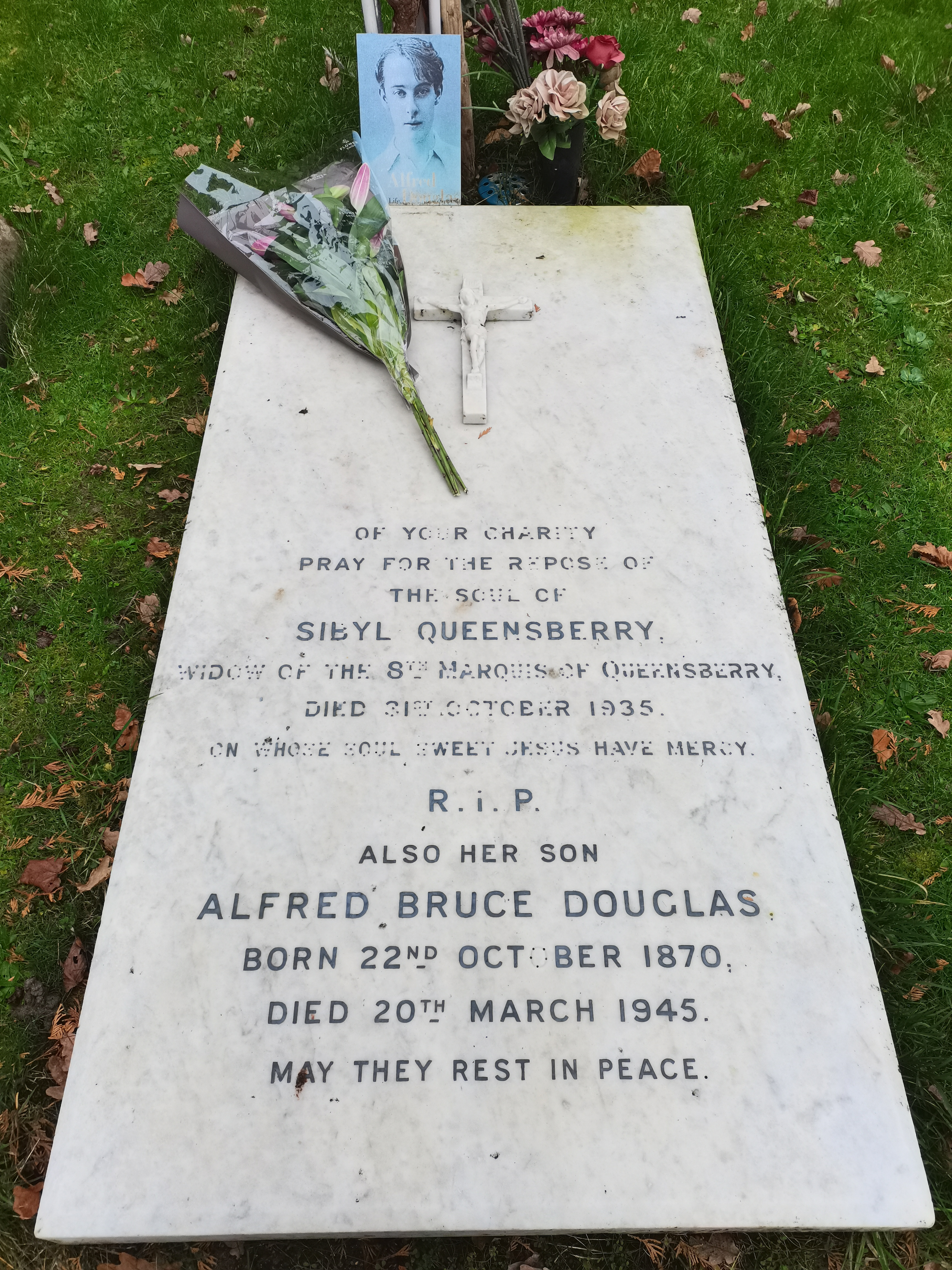
The grave of Alfred Douglas (and mother) at the Friary Church of St Francis and St Anthony, Crawley, Sussex, pictured in December 2021

Douglas died of congestive heart failure in Lancing, West Sussex, on 20 March 1945 at the age of 74. He was buried on 23 March at the Franciscan Friary, Crawley, alongside his mother, who had died on 31 October 1935 at the age of 90. They share a gravestone.

The elderly Douglas, living a reduced life in Hove in the 1940s, appears in the diaries of Henry Channon and in the first autobiography of Donald Sinden, whose son Marc Sinden claimed his father was one of only two people at the funeral. In fact the funeral report in The Times named some 20 mourners, including Sinden, with "other friends". He died at the home of Edward and Sheila Colman, who were the main beneficiaries in his will, inheriting the copyright to his work.

== Writings ==
Douglas published several volumes of poetry and two books about his relationship with Wilde, Oscar Wilde and Myself (1914, largely ghost-written by T. W. H. Crosland, assistant editor of the literary journal The Academy and later repudiated by Douglas) and Oscar Wilde: A Summing Up (1940). He also wrote two memoirs: The Autobiography of Lord Alfred Douglas (1929) and Without Apology (1938).

Douglas edited The Academy from 1907 to 1910, during which time he had an affair with the artist Romaine Brooks, who was also bisexual. The main love of her life, Natalie Clifford Barney, also had an affair with Wilde's niece Dorothy and even, in 1901, with Douglas's future wife Olive Custance, the year before the couple married. In 1912 and 1913, Douglas briefly edited the literary magazine The Antidote, published by Irene Osgood.

Of the six biographies of Douglas, the earlier ones by Braybrooke and Freeman were forbidden to quote from his copyright work, while De Profundis was unpublished. Later biographies were by Rupert Croft-Cooke, H. Montgomery Hyde (who also wrote about Wilde), Douglas Murray (who called Braybrooke's biography "a rehash and exaggeration of Douglas's book" [his autobiography]). The most recent is Alfred Douglas: A Poet's Life and His Finest Work by Caspar Wintermans in 2007.

In 1999, The University of Oxford established the Lord Alfred Douglas Memorial Prize for "...the best sonnet or other poem written in English and in strict rhyming metre." The award was established by Douglas's friend Sheila Colman, who, on her death, left a legacy of $36,000 to fund the award.

=== Poetry ===
- Poems (1896)
- Tails with a Twist "by a Belgian Hare" (1898)
- The City of the Soul (1899).
- The Duke of Berwick (1899)
- The Placid Pug (1906)
- The Pongo Papers and the Duke of Berwick (1907)
- Sonnets (1909)
- The Collected Poems of Lord Alfred Douglas (1919)
- In Excelsis (1924)
- The Complete Poems of Lord Alfred Douglas (1928)
- Sonnets (1935)
- Lyrics (1935)
- The Sonnets of Lord Alfred Douglas (1943)

=== Non-fiction ===
- Oscar Wilde and Myself (1914) (ghost-written by T. W. H. Crosland)
- Foreword to New Preface to the 'Life and Confessions of Oscar Wilde' by Frank Harris (1925)
- Introduction to Songs of Cell by Horatio Bottomley (1928)
- The Autobiography of Lord Alfred Douglas (1929; 2nd ed. 1931)
- My Friendship with Oscar Wilde (1932; retitled American version of his memoir)
- The True History of Shakespeare's Sonnets (1933)
- Introduction to The Pantomime Man by Richard Middleton (1933)
- Preface to Bernard Shaw, Frank Harris, and Oscar Wilde by Robert Harborough Sherard (1937)
- Without Apology (1938)
- Preface to Oscar Wilde: A Play by Leslie Stokes and Sewell Stokes (1938)
- Introduction to Brighton Aquatints by John Piper (1939)
- Ireland and the War Against Hitler (1940)
- Oscar Wilde: A Summing Up (1940)
- Introduction to Oscar Wilde and the Yellow Nineties by Frances Winwar (1941)
- The Principles of Poetry (1943)
- Preface to Wartime Harvest by Marie Carmichael Stopes (1944)

== In popular culture ==
In the films Oscar Wilde and The Trials of Oscar Wilde, both released in 1960, Douglas was portrayed by John Neville and John Fraser respectively. In the 1997 British film Wilde, Douglas was portrayed by Jude Law. In the 2018 film The Happy Prince, he was portrayed by Colin Morgan.

In the BBC drama Oscar (1985) he was portrayed by Robin Lermitte (credited as Robin McCallum); Michael Gambon played Wilde.

The queer history podcast Bad Gays covered Douglas in Episode 2 of their first season.
