= Fred Blackham =

Australian rules footballer

Personal information
- Full name: Frederick Albert Blackham
- Born: 6 April 1873; North Melbourne, Victoria
- Died: 31 January 1967 (aged 93); Melbourne
- Original team: Brighton

Playing career^{1}
Years	Club	Games (Goals)
1897	Melbourne	2 (0)
- ^{1} Playing statistics correct to the end of 1897.

Frederick Albert Blackham (6 April 1873 – 31 January 1967) was an Australian rules footballer who played with Melbourne in the Victorian Football League (VFL). His brother, Jack Blackham, played Test cricket for Australia.
