= Arthur Cherep-Spiridovich =

Russian noble and writer (1866–1926)

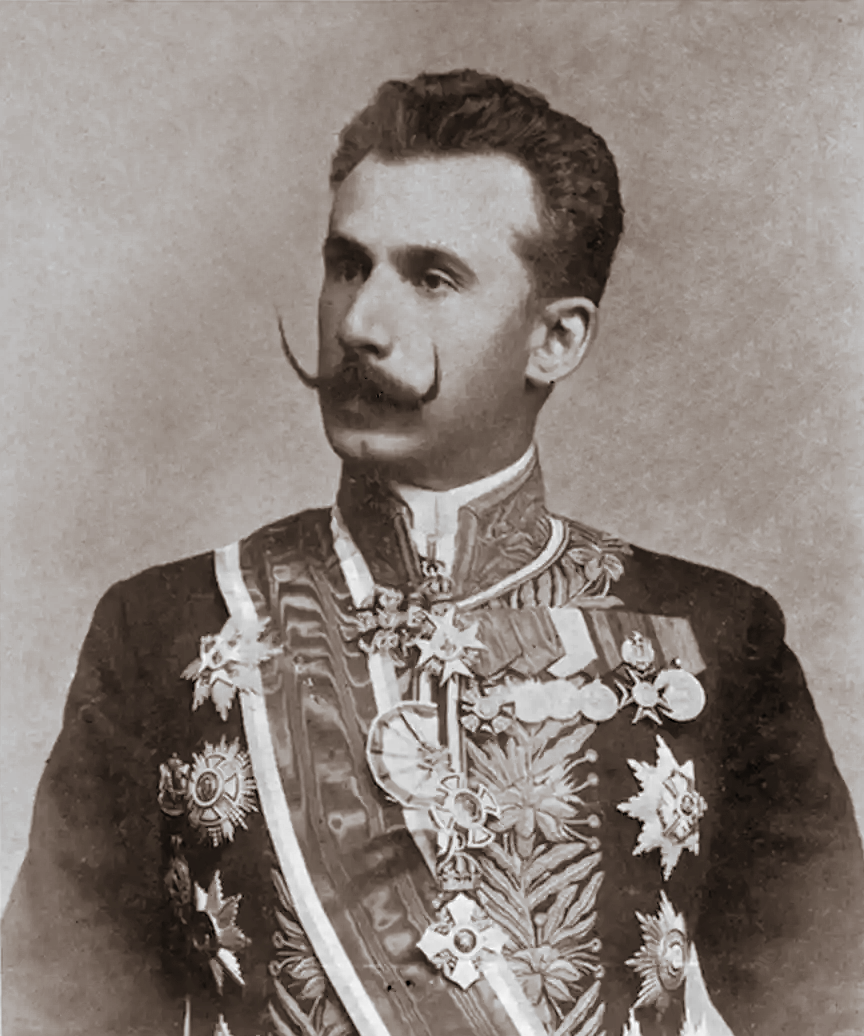
- Born: 8 September 1866; Russian Empire
- Died: 22 October 1926 (aged 60); Arrochar, Staten Island, New York City, U.S.
- Occupations: Russian diplomat, political activist.
- Writing career
- Notable works: The Secret World Government, or, "The Hidden Hand" (1926)

Major-General Count Arthur Cherep-Spiridovich (Russian: Артур Иванович Череп-Спиридович; 8 September 1866 – 22 October 1926) was a major-general in the Imperial Russian Navy who moved to the United States following the Bolshevik Revolution. He was a White Russian monarchist, and additionally he was heavily involved in Pan-Slavism, activism, and various chivalric orders and cultural organizations, especially in the White Russian diaspora community in America. He is perhaps best known for authoring a book titled The Secret World Government, or, "The Hidden Hand" (1926), which presents his theory that the world is being clandestinely governed by a group of 300 individuals of "Judeo-Mongol" ancestry.

== Biography ==
Cherep-Spiridovich claimed to be well versed in international affairs, and claimed a number of political successes and insights. He claimed to have been a Russian major-general, to have warned King Alexander I and Queen Draga Mašin of Serbia before their assassination in 1902, and to have warned Grand Duke Sergei Alexandrovich of Russia in 1904 before his 1905 assassination. He also claimed to have foreseen the First World War, and in the early 1920s he foresaw another international war.

Cherep-Spiridovich was president of the Slavonic Society of Russia and also of the Latino-Slavic League of Paris and Rome. Politically he was a supporter of the Tsar Nicholas II of Russia and an opponent of Bolshevism. According to Lord Alfred Douglas, well-known men like Henry Ford and newspapers like the Financial Times in London took him seriously and helped him to reach a fairly wide public.

He moved to Harlem, New York, in 1920 where he was detained at Ellis Island for a special inquiry by the Immigration Bureau before being admitted. In the US, he opened a branch of the Anglo-Latino-Slav League, where he advocated for unification of "white peoples of the globe against the domination of the colored peoples". He also organized the Universal Gentiles' League among Russians in the US.

After his arrival in the US, he became associated with anti-Semite Boris Brasol, who was involved with publication in the U.S. of The Protocols of the Elders of Zion. Cherep-Spiridovich wrote several anti-Semitic books and leaflets. On 8 February 1922, he stated he was preparing to publish a book titled The Unknown in History, but later on that same day he was stopped by armed men posing as US government officers, who seized a manuscript copy of the book in an effort to stop its publication. However, he had another manuscript copy of the book which was not confiscated. Partly as a reaction to this confiscation of a manuscript copy of his forthcoming book, he began recruiting people into the Universal Gentiles' League (aka the Universal Gentiles' Club), an organization he founded whose primary purpose was to raise awareness of and support for the issues and claims he planned to present in great detail in his forthcoming book. From a room in the Harlem neighborhood of Manhattan, New York City (probably from the headquarters of The Anti-Bolshevist Publishing Association, located at 15 East 128th Street, Manhattan) he began recruiting people into the Universal Gentiles' League. He began his recruitment campaign by mailing circulars to thousands of people (mostly to Russian emigres living in the U. S.), offering details about, and membership in, the League. In 1926 he finally published the book in question, under the title The Secret World Government, or, "The Hidden Hand" - The Unrevealed in History - 100 Historical "Mysteries" Explained. He also claimed the support of Henry Ford for his anti-Semitic beliefs.

Historians generally regard Arthur Cherep-Spiridovich as a marginal but illustrative figure within the wider White Russian émigré milieu, whose writings reflected the anxieties, conspiratorial thinking, and political radicalization common among displaced monarchist circles after the Bolshevik Revolution.

== Title of Count ==
Arthur often referred to himself as "count" Cherep-Spiridovich. This title of "count" had been conferred on him by Pope Pius X, not by the Russian government. Although he held the title of "count" legitimately as a member of the papal nobility, this did not confer on him any corresponding noble standing in Russia.

Arthur was a vigorous defender and promoter of Christianity (in the form of both Roman Catholicism and Orthodox Christianity) against the numerous anti-Christian and anti-gentile doctrines he perceived especially in the Babylonian Talmud, which he believed classified the behavior of Christians as ritually impure. His pro-Catholic activities in this regard were recognized by the Vatican, and formed the basis of his ennoblement by Pope Pius X to the rank of "count" in the papal nobility.

== Confusion of other individuals with Arthur ==
There were three other individuals alive at the same time as Arthur Cherep-Spiridovich (1866-1926), who were frequently confused with him in various records and accounts of events:

- (1) Major-General Alexander Spiridovich (Aleksandr Ivanovič Spiridovič) (1873-1952)
- (2) Albert Ivanovich Cherep-Spiridovich (died in August 1911)
- (3) Lieutenant-General (or General, or Count) Howard Victor Cherep-Spiridovich (aliases and/or pen-names of Howard Victor Broenstrup) (1886-1963)

Sometime between the death of Arthur on 22 October 1926 and 1930, Howard Victor Broenstrup (von Broenstrupp or von Broens-Trupp) (1886-1963), a patent attorney and Nazi propagandist in the United States, started using the aliases and/or pen-names Lieutenant-General (or General, or Count) Howard Victor Cherep-Spiridovich, apparently in an attempt to capitalize on the celebrity and notoriety which had become associated with the name "Count Cherep-Spiridovich" in the United States and Europe. The similarity of Broenstrup's aliases/pen-names with Arthur's name led many people who hadn't known the two men to mistakenly think they were the same person. Broenstrup used this confusion to his advantage - it allowed him to impersonate Arthur on many occasions, and to thereby capitalize on Arthur's celebrity, notoriety, and the mystery surrounding him.

== Death ==
Cherep-Spiridovich died on 22 October 1926 in his hotel room in the Barrett Manor, a hotel located in Arrochar, Staten Island, New York. The New York Times initially reported his death to be from accidental asphyxiation from a gas line, but after further investigation officials concluded (9 days later) that his death most likely was a suicide, because at the time of his death not only was he penniless and living in abject poverty, but his life's work of attempting to unite the 200 million Slavs in the U.S. and Europe into a republic had met with complete failure. Many Jewish sources including several newspapers from the time, also reported his death as a suicide.

Cherep-Spiridovich was buried in Saint Mary's Catholic Cemetery and Columbarium (located at 155 Parkinson Avenue and Kramer Street, Grasmere, Staten Island, New York 10307). Since he was penniless at the time of his death, several organizations (including the Russian Naval Club, the Russian Unity Society, and the Russian Editors' Association) came to his aid and paid his funeral and burial expenses, in order to save him from the indignity of being buried as a pauper in "Potter's Field".

== Works ==
- A Europe Without Turkey—the Security of France Requires (1913)
- Towards Disaster: Dangers and Remedies (1914)
- How to Save England (1920)
- Let Us Prevent the Second World War Already Prepared! (1921)
- The Secret World Government, or, "The Hidden Hand" - The Unrevealed in History - 100 Historical "Mysteries" Explained (The Anti-Bolshevist Publishing Association, 15 East 128th Street, New York) (1926) (A transcript may be found here

== Sources ==
- The Non-Existent Manuscript by Cesare G. De Michelis, (University of Nebraska Press: Lincoln and London, 2004), pp. 146, 161; ISBN 0-8032-1727-7
- Russia and Germany, A Century of Conflict by Walter Laqueur, (Boston/Toronto: Little, Brown and Company: 1965)
