= Sam Blackham =

English footballer

Personal information
- Full name: Samuel Blackham
- Date of birth: 19 August 1890
- Place of birth: Edmonton, London, England
- Date of death: 1956 (aged 65–66)
- Position: Full-back

Senior career*
Years	Team	Apps	(Gls)
1908–1909	Barnet Alston		
1909–1910	Tottenham Hotspur	0	(0)
1910–1911	Barrow		
1911–1922	Bradford Park Avenue	221	(0)
1922–1923	Halifax Town	6	(0)
1923–1924	Bradford Park Avenue	0	(0)
Total		227	(0)
- * Club domestic league appearances and goals

Samuel Blackham (19 August 1890 – 1956) was an English footballer who played in the Football League for Bradford Park Avenue and Halifax Town.
