= Blackham baronets =

Extinct baronetcy in the Baronetage of England

Blackham of London

The Blackham Baronetcy, of London, was a title in the Baronetage of England. It was created on 13 April 1696 by King William III for Richard Blackham, a woollen manufacturer and a Turkey merchant. The title became extinct on the death of his son the second Baronet John Blackham in 1728.

== Blackham Baronets, of London (1696) ==
- Sir Richard Blackham, 1st Baronet (died 1728)
- Sir John Blackham, 2nd Baronet (died 1728)

== Coat of arms ==
The Blackham coat of arms was created for Sir Richard Blackham in 1696 on the creation of the Blackham Baronetcy. Blackham of London Coat of Arms; Azure, two bars between nine cross crosslets. 3. 3. 3. Or.

== Sir Richard Blackham ==
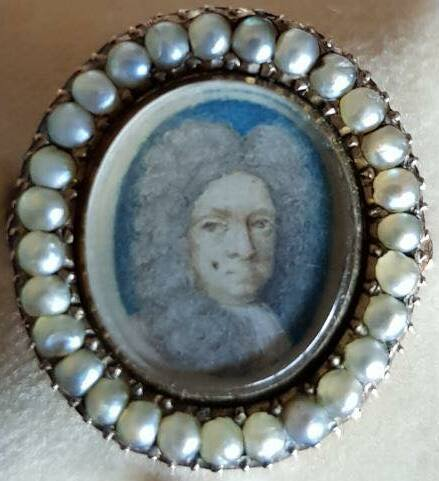
Sir Richard Blackham

Sir Richard Blackham was a merchant and woolen manufacturer. His family was 'from Warwickshire and Staffordshire extraction'. An ancestor with the same name was knighted by Charles I of England in 1631. Many of the Blackham family were merchants in London. In 1690 Blackham travelled to Ireland with William III of England where he was involved in clothing six thousand of Williams soldiers for the Battle of the Boyne. He also provided ships for the King during the Nine Years War.

In 1696 Blackham signed a contract with Captain Kidd who was commissioned by William III to set out on a pirate hunting expedition where he was to entitled to receive ten per cent of any recovered profits. However, as he needed additional funding for the voyage he made a deal with Blackham. In the agreement Kidd exchanged some of his promised shares in return for money.

Blackham was described by an early eighteenth-century source as "one of the greatest traders and promoters of the woollen manufactures in the kingdom". During the Nine Years' War, he exported large quantities of English woollen cloth and other English manufactured goods to the Ottoman Empire and markets across Europe. He continued trading without the protection of naval convoys despite the threat posed by French naval forces, at a time when the Levant fleet was reluctant to sail without a substantial escort. His trade was said to have helped maintain English exports to the Ottoman Empire and supported employment in the woollen manufacturing industry. Following a hearing before the House of Commons in a dispute with the Levant Company, Parliament ordered that he be admitted as a freeman of the company in recognition of his public services.

Blackham and his wife were apprehended for manufacturing counterfeit coins in 1705. In another instance in the Old Bailey he was found "guilty of Misprision of treason for melting down the coin of England, and making foreign coins of it".

Blackham was married to Elizabeth Appleyard born c.1690, with whom he had five children, three of whom died in infancy. Their son John survived and succeeded to the title. Elizabeth died circa December 1731 at St Katherine Coleman, London. She was buried on 11 December 1731 at St. Benet's, Gracechurch Street, London. Blackham died on 29 June 1728. He was buried at St Benet's, Gracechurch Street, London.

== Sir John Blackham ==
Sir Richard's son Sir John Blackham lived at Lyon's Inn, St Clement Danes, London.

He died on the 2nd of July 1728, surviving his father by only three days. He was buried on 9 July 1728 at St. Benet's, Gracechurch Street, London. The Baronetcy became extinct on his death.
