= Secretary of State for the Colonies =

British Cabinet minister

- Royal arms of His Majesty's Government

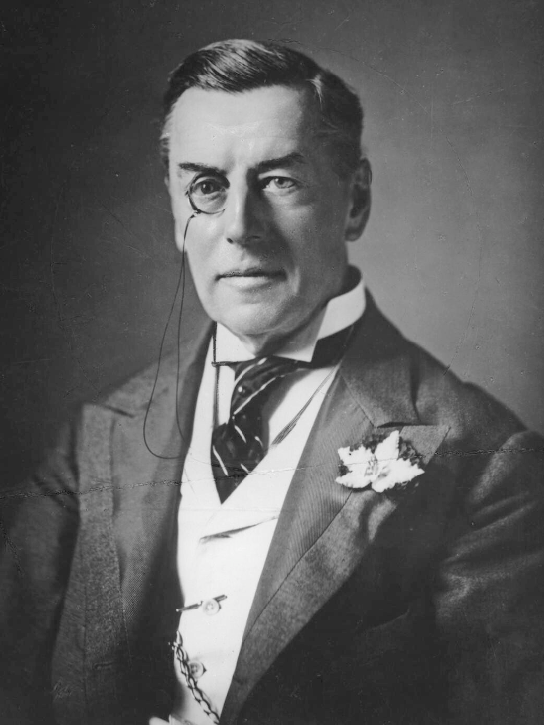
- Longest serving Joseph Chamberlain; 29 June 1895–16 September 1903
- Colonial Office
- Style: The Right Honourable
- Type: Secretary of state
- Member of: Cabinet; Privy Council
- Reports to: Prime Minister
- Nominator: Prime Minister
- Appointer: The Monarch (on the advice of the Prime Minister)
- Term length: At His Majesty's pleasure
- Formation: 27 February 1768 (1st time); 12 June 1854 (2nd time)
- First holder: The Earl of Hillsborough (1st time); Sir George Grey (2nd time)
- Final holder: Welbore Ellis (1st time); Frederick Lee (2nd time)
- Abolished: 8 March 1782 (1st time); 1 August 1966 (2nd time)
- Superseded by: Foreign Secretary
- Deputy: Under-Secretary of State for the Colonies

The secretary of state for the colonies or colonial secretary was the Cabinet of the United Kingdom's minister in charge of managing certain parts of the British Empire.

The colonial secretary never had responsibility for the provinces and princely states of India, which had its own secretary of state.

From 1768 until 1966, the secretary of state was supported by an under-secretary of state for the colonies (at times an under-secretary of state for war and the colonies), and latterly by a minister of state.

== History ==
Colonial responsibilities were previously held jointly by the lords of trade and plantations (board) and the secretary of state for the Southern Department, who was responsible for Ireland, the American colonies, and relations with the Catholic and Muslim states of Europe, as well as being jointly responsible for domestic affairs with the Secretary of State for the Northern Department.

=== Colonial Secretary 1768–1782 ===
The Colonial Secretary position was first created in 1768 to deal with the increasingly troublesome North American colonies, following passage of the Townsend Acts. Joint responsibility between the secretary and board first continued at this time, but subsequent diminution of the board's status led it to became an adjunct to the new secretary's department.

Following the loss of the American colonies, both the board and the short-lived secretaryship were dismissed by the king on 2 May 1782; both were abolished later by the Civil List and Secret Service Money Act 1782 (22 Geo. 3, c 82). Following this, colonial duties were given to the Home Secretary, then Lord Sydney.

=== 1782–1854 ===
Responsibility for the Colonies in the years between 1782 and 1854 included:

- Home Secretary 1782–1801
- Secretary of State for War and the Colonies 1801–1854
- Secretary of State for the Colonies from 1854

Following the Treaty of Paris 1783, a new board, named the Committee of Council on Trade and Plantations (later known as 'the First Committee') was established under William Pitt the Younger, by an Order in Council in 1784. In 1794, a new office was created for Henry Dundas – the secretary of state for war, which now took responsibility for the Colonies. The office was renamed the Secretary of State for War and the Colonies in 1801.

=== 1854–present ===
In 1854, military reforms led to the colonial and military responsibilities of this secretary of state being split into two separate offices, with Sir George Grey becoming the first secretary of state for the colonies under the new arrangement.

In the latter part of the nineteenth century, Britain gained control over a number of territories with the status of "protectorate". The ministerial responsibility for these territories was initially held by the Foreign Secretary.

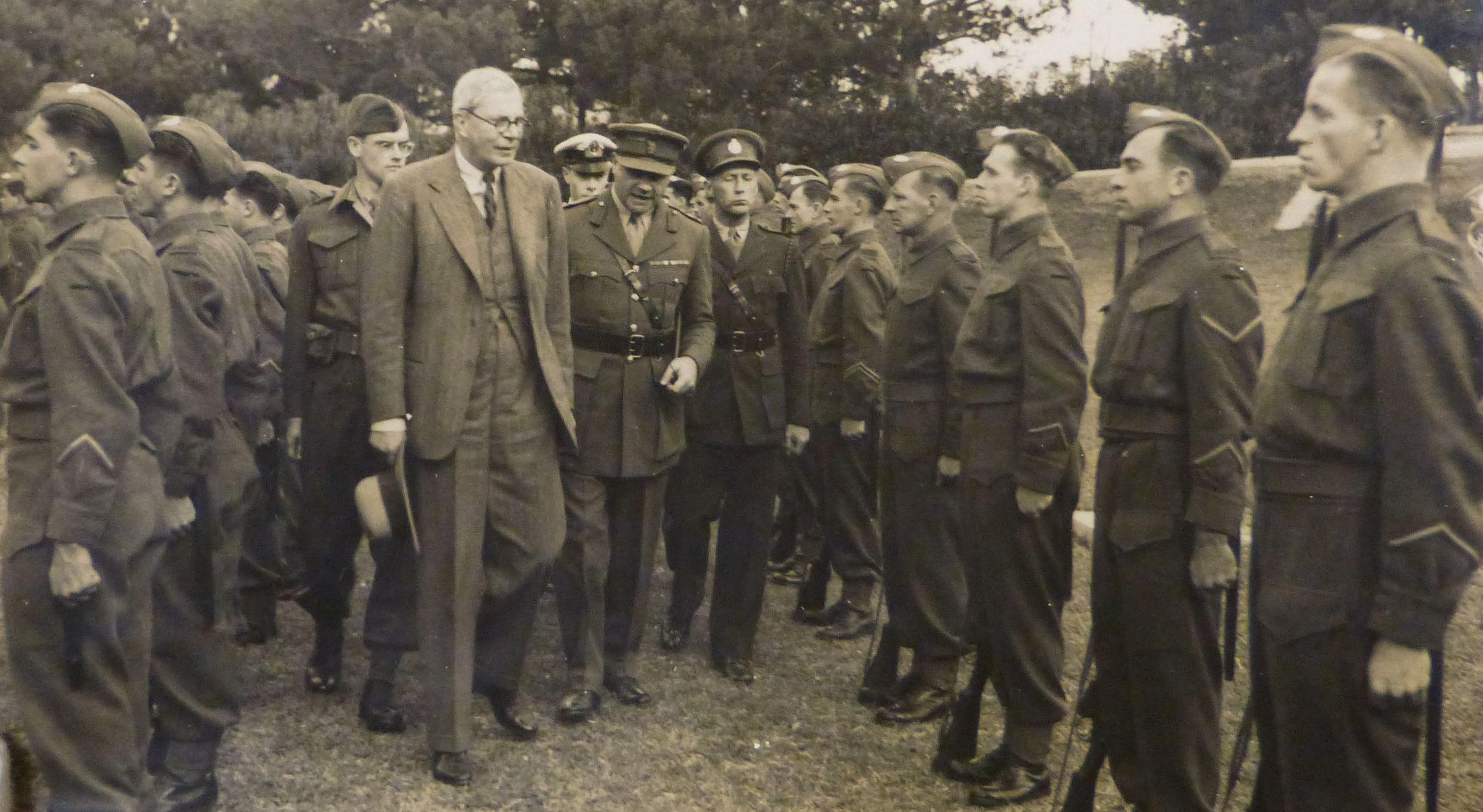
Oliver Stanley inspects the Bermuda Volunteer Rifle Corps at the Imperial Fortress of Bermuda, 30th December, 1944.

By the early years of the twentieth century the responsibility for each of the protectorate territories had been transferred to the colonial secretary as well. The League of Nations mandated territories acquired as a result of the Treaty of Versailles in 1919 became a further responsibility of the Colonial Office in the aftermath of the First World War.

In 1925, part of the Colonial Office was separated out as the Dominions Office, with its own secretary of state. The new office was responsible for dealing with the Dominions together with a small number of other territories (most notably Southern Rhodesia).

In the twenty years following the end of the Second World War, much of the British Empire was dismantled as its various territories gained independence. In consequence, the Colonial Office was merged in 1966 with the Commonwealth Relations Office (which until 1947 had been the Dominions Office) to form the Commonwealth Office, while ministerial responsibility was transferred to the secretary of state for Commonwealth affairs (previously known as the secretary of state for Commonwealth relations). In 1968, the Commonwealth Office was subsumed into the Foreign Office, which was renamed the Foreign and Commonwealth Office (FCO).

== List of secretaries of state for the colonies ==
=== Secretaries of state for the colonies (1768–1782) ===
Sometimes referred to as Secretary of State for the American Colonies.

Secretary of State for the Colonies
Secretary	Term of office		Ministry	Monarch (Reign)
Wills Hill; 1st Earl of Hillsborough	27 February 1768	27 August 1772	Grafton	George III (1760–1820)
Wills Hill; 1st Earl of Hillsborough	27 February 1768	27 August 1772	North	George III (1760–1820)
William Legge; 2nd Earl of Dartmouth	27 August 1772	10 November 1775	North	George III (1760–1820)
Lord George Germain; MP for East Grinstead	10 November 1775	February; 1782	North	George III (1760–1820)
Welbore Ellis; MP for Weymouth and Melcombe Regis	February; 1782	8 March 1782	North	George III (1760–1820)

Office abolished in 1782 after the loss of the American Colonies.

=== Secretaries of state for the colonies (1854–1966) ===
Secretary of State for the Colonies	Term of office		Party	Ministry	Monarch (Reign)
Sir George Grey, Bt. MP for Morpeth	12 June 1854	8 February 1855	Whig	Aberdeen (Peelite–Whig)	Victoria (1837–1901)
Sidney Herbert; MP for South Wiltshire	8 February 1855	23 February 1855	Whig	Palmerston I	Victoria (1837–1901)
Lord John Russell; MP for City of London	23 February 1855	21 July 1855	Whig	Palmerston I	Victoria (1837–1901)
Sir William Molesworth, Bt. MP for Southwark	21 July 1855	21 November 1855	Radical	Palmerston I	Victoria (1837–1901)
Henry Labouchere; MP for Taunton	21 November 1855	21 February 1858	Whig	Palmerston I	Victoria (1837–1901)
Edward Stanley; Lord Stanley; MP for King's Lynn	26 February 1858	5 June 1858	Conservative	Derby–Disraeli II	Victoria (1837–1901)
Sir Edward Bulwer-Lytton; MP for Hertfordshire	5 June 1858	11 June 1859	Conservative	Derby–Disraeli II	Victoria (1837–1901)
Henry Pelham-Clinton; 5th Duke of Newcastle (1811–1864)	18 June 1859	7 April 1864	Liberal	Palmerston II	Victoria (1837–1901)
Edward Cardwell; MP for Oxford	7 April 1864	26 June 1866	Liberal	Palmerston II	Victoria (1837–1901)
Edward Cardwell; MP for Oxford	7 April 1864	26 June 1866	Liberal	Russell II	Victoria (1837–1901)
Henry Herbert; 4th Earl of Carnarvon (1831–1890)	6 July 1866	8 March 1867	Conservative	Derby–Disraeli III	Victoria (1837–1901)
Richard Temple-Grenville; 3rd Duke of Buckingham and Chandos (1823–1889)	8 March 1867	1 December 1868	Conservative	Derby–Disraeli III	Victoria (1837–1901)
Granville Leveson-Gower; 2nd Earl Granville (1815–1891)	9 December 1868	6 July 1870	Liberal	Gladstone I	Victoria (1837–1901)
John Wodehouse; 1st Earl of Kimberley (1826–1902)	6 July 1870	17 February 1874	Liberal	Gladstone I	Victoria (1837–1901)
Henry Herbert; 4th Earl of Carnarvon	21 February 1874	4 February 1878	Conservative	Disraeli II	Victoria (1837–1901)
Sir Michael Hicks Beach, Bt. MP for Gloucestershire East	4 February 1878	21 April 1880	Conservative	Disraeli II	Victoria (1837–1901)
John Wodehouse; 1st Earl of Kimberley (1826–1902)	21 April 1880	16 December 1882	Liberal	Gladstone II	Victoria (1837–1901)
Edward Stanley; 15th Earl of Derby (1826–1893)	16 December 1882	9 June 1885	Liberal	Gladstone II	Victoria (1837–1901)
Frederick Stanley; MP for Blackpool	24 June 1885	28 January 1886	Conservative	Salisbury I	Victoria (1837–1901)
Granville Leveson-Gower; 2nd Earl Granville (1815–1891)	6 February 1886	20 July 1886	Liberal	Gladstone III	Victoria (1837–1901)
Edward Stanhope; MP for Horncastle	3 August 1886	14 January 1887	Conservative	Salisbury II	Victoria (1837–1901)
Henry Holland; 1st Baron Knutsford	14 January 1887	11 August 1892	Conservative	Salisbury II	Victoria (1837–1901)
George Robinson; 1st Marquess of Ripon (1827–1909)	18 August 1892	21 June 1895	Liberal	Gladstone IV	Victoria (1837–1901)
George Robinson; 1st Marquess of Ripon (1827–1909)	18 August 1892	21 June 1895	Liberal	Rosebery	Victoria (1837–1901)
Joseph Chamberlain; MP for Birmingham West	29 June 1895	16 September 1903	Liberal Unionist	Salisbury (III & IV) (Con.–Lib.U.)	Victoria (1837–1901)
Joseph Chamberlain; MP for Birmingham West	29 June 1895	16 September 1903	Liberal Unionist	Salisbury (III & IV) (Con.–Lib.U.)	Edward VII (1901–1910)
Joseph Chamberlain; MP for Birmingham West	29 June 1895	16 September 1903	Liberal Unionist	Balfour (Con.–Lib.U.)	Edward VII (1901–1910)
Alfred Lyttelton; MP for Warwick and Leamington	11 October 1903	4 December 1905	Liberal Unionist	Balfour (Con.–Lib.U.)	Edward VII (1901–1910)
Victor Bruce; 9th Earl of Elgin (1849–1917)	10 December 1905	12 April 1908	Liberal	Campbell-Bannerman	Edward VII (1901–1910)
Robert Crewe-Milnes; 1st Marquess of Crewe (1858–1945)	12 April 1908	3 November 1910	Liberal	Asquith (I–III)	Edward VII (1901–1910)
Robert Crewe-Milnes; 1st Marquess of Crewe (1858–1945)	12 April 1908	3 November 1910	Liberal	Asquith (I–III)	George V (1910–1936)
Lewis Vernon Harcourt; MP for Rossendale	3 November 1910	25 May 1915	Liberal	Asquith (I–III)	George V (1910–1936)
Bonar Law; MP for Bootle	25 May 1915	10 December 1916	Conservative	Asquith Coalition (Lib.–Con.–Lab.)	George V (1910–1936)
Walter Long; MP for Westminster St George's (Note: MP for Strand until 1918; thereafter MP for Westminster St George's.) (1854–1924)	10 December 1916	10 January 1919	Conservative	Lloyd George (I & II) (Lib.–Con.–Lab.)	George V (1910–1936)
Alfred Milner; 1st Viscount Milner (1854–1925)	10 January 1919	13 February 1921	Liberal	Lloyd George (I & II) (Lib.–Con.–Lab.)	George V (1910–1936)
Winston Churchill; MP for Dundee	13 February 1921	19 October 1922	Liberal	Lloyd George (I & II) (Lib.–Con.–Lab.)	George V (1910–1936)
Victor Cavendish; 9th Duke of Devonshire (1868–1938)	24 October 1922	22 January 1924	Conservative	Law	George V (1910–1936)
Victor Cavendish; 9th Duke of Devonshire (1868–1938)	24 October 1922	22 January 1924	Conservative	Baldwin I	George V (1910–1936)
James Henry Thomas; MP for Derby	22 January 1924	3 November 1924	Labour	MacDonald I	George V (1910–1936)
Leo Amery; MP for Birmingham Sparkbrook	6 November 1924	4 June 1929	Conservative	Baldwin II	George V (1910–1936)
Sidney Webb; 1st Baron Passfield (1859–1947)	7 June 1929	24 August 1931	Labour	MacDonald II	George V (1910–1936)
James Henry Thomas; MP for Derby	25 August 1931	5 November 1931	National Labour	National I (N.Lab.–Con.–Lib.N.–Lib.)	George V (1910–1936)
Philip Cunliffe-Lister; MP for Hendon	5 November 1931	7 June 1935	Conservative	National II (N.Lab.–Con.–Lib.N.–Lib.)	George V (1910–1936)
Malcolm MacDonald; MP for Bassetlaw	7 June 1935	22 November 1935	National Labour	National III (Con.–N.Lab.–Lib.N.)	George V (1910–1936)
James Henry Thomas; MP for Derby	22 November 1935	22 May 1936	National Labour	National III (Con.–N.Lab.–Lib.N.)	George V (1910–1936)
James Henry Thomas; MP for Derby	22 November 1935	22 May 1936	National Labour	National III (Con.–N.Lab.–Lib.N.)	Edward VIII (1936)
William Ormsby-Gore; MP for Stafford	28 May 1936	16 May 1938	Conservative	National III (Con.–N.Lab.–Lib.N.)	Edward VIII (1936)
William Ormsby-Gore; MP for Stafford	28 May 1936	16 May 1938	Conservative	National III (Con.–N.Lab.–Lib.N.)	George VI (1936–1952)
William Ormsby-Gore; MP for Stafford	28 May 1936	16 May 1938	Conservative	National IV (Con.–N.Lab.–Lib.N.)	George VI (1936–1952)
Malcolm MacDonald; MP for Ross and Cromarty	16 May 1938	12 May 1940	National Labour	National IV (Con.–N.Lab.–Lib.N.)	George VI (1936–1952)
Malcolm MacDonald; MP for Ross and Cromarty	16 May 1938	12 May 1940	National Labour	Chamberlain War (Con.–N.Lab.–Lib.N.)	George VI (1936–1952)
George Lloyd; 1st Baron Lloyd (1879–1941)	12 May 1940	4 February 1941	Conservative	Churchill War (All parties)	George VI (1936–1952)
Walter Guinness; 1st Baron Moyne (1880–1944)	8 February 1941	22 February 1942	Conservative	Churchill War (All parties)	George VI (1936–1952)
Robert Gascoyne-Cecil; Viscount Cranborne; MP for South Dorset	22 February 1942	22 November 1942	Conservative	Churchill War (All parties)	George VI (1936–1952)
Oliver Stanley; MP for Westmorland	22 November 1942	26 July 1945	Conservative	Churchill War (All parties)	George VI (1936–1952)
Oliver Stanley; MP for Westmorland	22 November 1942	26 July 1945	Conservative	Churchill Caretaker (Con.–N.Lib.)	George VI (1936–1952)
George Henry Hall; MP for Aberdare	3 August 1945	4 October 1946	Labour	Attlee (I & II)	George VI (1936–1952)
Arthur Creech Jones; MP for Shipley	4 October 1946	28 February 1950	Labour	Attlee (I & II)	George VI (1936–1952)
Jim Griffiths; MP for Llanelli	28 February 1950	26 October 1951	Labour	Attlee (I & II)	George VI (1936–1952)
Oliver Lyttelton; MP for Aldershot	28 October 1951	28 July 1954	Conservative	Churchill III	George VI (1936–1952)
Oliver Lyttelton; MP for Aldershot	28 October 1951	28 July 1954	Conservative	Churchill III	Elizabeth II (1952–2022)
Alan Lennox-Boyd; MP for Mid Bedfordshire	28 July 1954	14 October 1959	Conservative	Churchill III	Elizabeth II (1952–2022)
Alan Lennox-Boyd; MP for Mid Bedfordshire	28 July 1954	14 October 1959	Conservative	Eden	Elizabeth II (1952–2022)
Alan Lennox-Boyd; MP for Mid Bedfordshire	28 July 1954	14 October 1959	Conservative	Macmillan (I & II)	Elizabeth II (1952–2022)
Iain Macleod; MP for Enfield West	14 October 1959	9 October 1961	Conservative	Macmillan (I & II)	Elizabeth II (1952–2022)
Reginald Maudling; MP for Barnet	9 October 1961	13 July 1962	Conservative	Macmillan (I & II)	Elizabeth II (1952–2022)
Duncan Sandys; MP for Streatham	13 July 1962	16 October 1964	Conservative	Macmillan (I & II)	Elizabeth II (1952–2022)
Duncan Sandys; MP for Streatham	13 July 1962	16 October 1964	Conservative	Douglas-Home	Elizabeth II (1952–2022)
Anthony Greenwood; MP for Rossendale	18 October 1964	23 December 1965	Labour	Wilson (I & II)	Elizabeth II (1952–2022)
Frank Pakenham; 7th Earl of Longford (1905–2001)	23 December 1965	6 April 1966	Labour	Wilson (I & II)	Elizabeth II (1952–2022)
Frederick Lee; MP for Newton	6 April 1966	1 August 1966	Labour	Wilson (I & II)	Elizabeth II (1952–2022)

Responsibility for the colonies held by:

- Secretary of State for Commonwealth Affairs 1966–1968
- Secretary of State for Foreign and Commonwealth Affairs 1968–present

Following the British Nationality Act 1981, the term "colony" ceased to be used; Britain's rule over Hong Kong, the last significant colony, ceased in 1997. Britain retains certain overseas territories.

== Secretaries from the colonies ==
A few title holders were born in colonies under their portfolio and some beyond:

- Bonar Law – born in pre-Canada colony of New Brunswick and later moved to the United Kingdom
- Victor Bruce, 9th Earl of Elgin – born in Canada during his father's, James Bruce, 8th Earl of Elgin, term as Governor General of Canada and a British appointee
- Alfred Milner, 1st Viscount Milner – born in Grand Duchy of Hesse (now in Germany) to Charles Milner (who had English roots from his father)
- Leo Amery – born in British India to an English father serving in India

== See also ==
- Colonial Land and Emigration Commission

History of English and British government departments with responsibility for foreign affairs and those with responsibility for the colonies, dominions and the Commonwealth
Northern Department; 1660–1782; Secretaries — Undersecretaries	Southern Department; 1660–1768; Secretaries — Undersecretaries		—
Northern Department; 1660–1782; Secretaries — Undersecretaries	Southern Department; 1768–1782; Secretaries — Undersecretaries; 1782: diplomatic responsibilities transferred to new Foreign Office	Colonial Office; 1768–1782; Secretaries — Undersecretaries	—
Foreign Office; 1782–1968; Secretaries — Ministers — Undersecretaries	Home Office; 1782–1794; Secretaries — Undersecretaries		—
Foreign Office; 1782–1968; Secretaries — Ministers — Undersecretaries	War Office; 1794–1801; Secretaries — Undersecretaries		—
Foreign Office; 1782–1968; Secretaries — Ministers — Undersecretaries	War and Colonial Office; 1801–1854; Secretaries — Undersecretaries		—
Foreign Office; 1782–1968; Secretaries — Ministers — Undersecretaries	Colonial Office; 1854–1925; Secretaries — Undersecretaries		India Office; 1858–1937; Secretaries — Undersecretaries
Foreign Office; 1782–1968; Secretaries — Ministers — Undersecretaries	Colonial Office; 1925–1966; Secretaries — Ministers — Undersecretaries	Dominions Office; 1925–1947; Secretaries — Undersecretaries	India Office; 1858–1937; Secretaries — Undersecretaries
Foreign Office; 1782–1968; Secretaries — Ministers — Undersecretaries	Colonial Office; 1925–1966; Secretaries — Ministers — Undersecretaries	Dominions Office; 1925–1947; Secretaries — Undersecretaries	India Office and Burma Office; 1937–1947; Secretaries — Undersecretaries
Foreign Office; 1782–1968; Secretaries — Ministers — Undersecretaries	Colonial Office; 1925–1966; Secretaries — Ministers — Undersecretaries	Commonwealth Relations Office; 1947–1966; Secretaries — Ministers — Undersecretaries	
Foreign Office; 1782–1968; Secretaries — Ministers — Undersecretaries	Commonwealth Office; 1966–1968; Secretaries — Ministers — Undersecretaries		
Foreign and Commonwealth Office; 1968–2020; Secretaries — Ministers — Undersecretaries
Foreign, Commonwealth and Development Office; Since 2020; Secretaries — Ministers — Undersecretaries
