= Secretary of State for Commonwealth Affairs =

British government official overseeing post-Empire relations

The secretary of state for commonwealth affairs was a British Cabinet minister responsible for dealing with the United Kingdom's relations with members of the Commonwealth of Nations (its former colonies). The minister's department was the Commonwealth Office.

The position was created on 1 August 1966 by the merger of the old positions of secretary of state for commonwealth relations and secretary of state for the colonies. In 1968 the position was merged with that of secretary of state for foreign affairs to create the new position of secretary of state for foreign and Commonwealth affairs.

== Secretaries of state for commonwealth affairs, 1966–1968 ==
Name	Term of office		Political party	P.M.	F.Sec.
Herbert Bowden; MP for Leicester South West	1 August 1966	29 August 1967	Labour	Wilson	Stewart
Herbert Bowden; MP for Leicester South West	1 August 1966	29 August 1967	Labour	Wilson	G.Brown
George Thomson; MP for Dundee East	29 August 1967	17 October 1968	Labour	Wilson	G.Brown
George Thomson; MP for Dundee East	29 August 1967	17 October 1968	Labour	Wilson	Stewart

== Shadow secretaries of state for commonwealth affairs ==
Name	Entered office	Left office	Political party	Shadow Cabinet
Reginald Maudling; MP for Barnet	1 August 1966	21 April 1968	Conservative	Heath
Alec Douglas-Home; MP for Kinross and Western Perthshire	21 April 1968	17 October 1968	Conservative	Heath

History of English and British government departments with responsibility for foreign affairs and those with responsibility for the colonies, dominions and the Commonwealth
Northern Department; 1660–1782; Secretaries — Undersecretaries	Southern Department; 1660–1768; Secretaries — Undersecretaries		—
Northern Department; 1660–1782; Secretaries — Undersecretaries	Southern Department; 1768–1782; Secretaries — Undersecretaries; 1782: diplomatic responsibilities transferred to new Foreign Office	Colonial Office; 1768–1782; Secretaries — Undersecretaries	—
Foreign Office; 1782–1968; Secretaries — Ministers — Undersecretaries	Home Office; 1782–1794; Secretaries — Undersecretaries		—
Foreign Office; 1782–1968; Secretaries — Ministers — Undersecretaries	War Office; 1794–1801; Secretaries — Undersecretaries		—
Foreign Office; 1782–1968; Secretaries — Ministers — Undersecretaries	War and Colonial Office; 1801–1854; Secretaries — Undersecretaries		—
Foreign Office; 1782–1968; Secretaries — Ministers — Undersecretaries	Colonial Office; 1854–1925; Secretaries — Undersecretaries		India Office; 1858–1937; Secretaries — Undersecretaries
Foreign Office; 1782–1968; Secretaries — Ministers — Undersecretaries	Colonial Office; 1925–1966; Secretaries — Ministers — Undersecretaries	Dominions Office; 1925–1947; Secretaries — Undersecretaries	India Office; 1858–1937; Secretaries — Undersecretaries
Foreign Office; 1782–1968; Secretaries — Ministers — Undersecretaries	Colonial Office; 1925–1966; Secretaries — Ministers — Undersecretaries	Dominions Office; 1925–1947; Secretaries — Undersecretaries	India Office and Burma Office; 1937–1947; Secretaries — Undersecretaries
Foreign Office; 1782–1968; Secretaries — Ministers — Undersecretaries	Colonial Office; 1925–1966; Secretaries — Ministers — Undersecretaries	Commonwealth Relations Office; 1947–1966; Secretaries — Ministers — Undersecretaries	
Foreign Office; 1782–1968; Secretaries — Ministers — Undersecretaries	Commonwealth Office; 1966–1968; Secretaries — Ministers — Undersecretaries		
Foreign and Commonwealth Office; 1968–2020; Secretaries — Ministers — Undersecretaries			Department for International Development; 1997–2020; Secretaries
Foreign, Commonwealth and Development Office; Since 2020; Secretaries — Ministers — Undersecretaries
