= Under-Secretary of State for Commonwealth Relations =

The Under-Secretary of State for Commonwealth Relations was a junior ministerial post in the United Kingdom Government from 1947 until 1966. The holder was responsible for assisting the Secretary of State for Commonwealth Relations in dealing with British relationship with members of the Commonwealth of Nations (its former colonies). The position was created out of the old position of Under-Secretary of State for Dominion Affairs.

After 1966 the post was merged with the Under-Secretary of State for the Colonies and became the Under-Secretary of State for Commonwealth Affairs.

== Officeholders ==
- 1947: Arthur Bottomley
- 1947: Patrick Gordon Walker
- 1948: Archibald Carter
- 1950: Angus Holden, 3rd Baron Holden
- 1950: David Rees Williams
- 1951: George Bingham, 6th Earl of Lucan
- 1951: John Foster
- 1954: Douglas Dodds-Parker
- 1955: Allan Noble
- 1956: Lord John Hope
- 1957: Cuthbert Alport
- 1959: Richard Thompson
- 1960: Andrew Cavendish, 11th Duke of Devonshire (to 1962)
- 1961: Bernard Braine (to 1962)
- 1962: John Tilney (to 1964)
- 1964: Stephen Taylor, Baron Taylor, also Under-Secretary of State for the Colonies
- 1965: Frank Beswick, Baron Beswick, also Under-Secretary of State for the Colonies until 1 August 1966

History of English and British government departments with responsibility for foreign affairs and those with responsibility for the colonies, dominions and the Commonwealth
Northern Department; 1660–1782; Secretaries — Undersecretaries	Southern Department; 1660–1768; Secretaries — Undersecretaries		—
Northern Department; 1660–1782; Secretaries — Undersecretaries	Southern Department; 1768–1782; Secretaries — Undersecretaries; 1782: diplomatic responsibilities transferred to new Foreign Office	Colonial Office; 1768–1782; Secretaries — Undersecretaries	—
Foreign Office; 1782–1968; Secretaries — Ministers — Undersecretaries	Home Office; 1782–1794; Secretaries — Undersecretaries		—
Foreign Office; 1782–1968; Secretaries — Ministers — Undersecretaries	War Office; 1794–1801; Secretaries — Undersecretaries		—
Foreign Office; 1782–1968; Secretaries — Ministers — Undersecretaries	War and Colonial Office; 1801–1854; Secretaries — Undersecretaries		—
Foreign Office; 1782–1968; Secretaries — Ministers — Undersecretaries	Colonial Office; 1854–1925; Secretaries — Undersecretaries		India Office; 1858–1937; Secretaries — Undersecretaries
Foreign Office; 1782–1968; Secretaries — Ministers — Undersecretaries	Colonial Office; 1925–1966; Secretaries — Ministers — Undersecretaries	Dominions Office; 1925–1947; Secretaries — Undersecretaries	India Office; 1858–1937; Secretaries — Undersecretaries
Foreign Office; 1782–1968; Secretaries — Ministers — Undersecretaries	Colonial Office; 1925–1966; Secretaries — Ministers — Undersecretaries	Dominions Office; 1925–1947; Secretaries — Undersecretaries	India Office and Burma Office; 1937–1947; Secretaries — Undersecretaries
Foreign Office; 1782–1968; Secretaries — Ministers — Undersecretaries	Colonial Office; 1925–1966; Secretaries — Ministers — Undersecretaries	Commonwealth Relations Office; 1947–1966; Secretaries — Ministers — Undersecretaries	
Foreign Office; 1782–1968; Secretaries — Ministers — Undersecretaries	Commonwealth Office; 1966–1968; Secretaries — Ministers — Undersecretaries		
Foreign and Commonwealth Office; 1968–2020; Secretaries — Ministers — Undersecretaries			Department for International Development; 1997–2020; Secretaries
Foreign, Commonwealth and Development Office; Since 2020; Secretaries — Ministers — Undersecretaries
