= Northern Department =

Former British government department (1660–1782)

Department overview
- Formed: 1660
- Dissolved: 1782
- Superseding Department: Foreign Office, Home Office
- Jurisdiction: Kingdom of Great Britain
- Minister responsible: Secretary of State for the Northern Department

The Northern Department was a department of the government of the Kingdom of England from 1660 to 1707 and later the Kingdom of Great Britain from 1707 until 1782 when its functions were reorganised into the new Home Office and Foreign Office.

== History ==
The Northern Department was, together with the Southern Department, responsible for both foreign and domestic affairs. Foreign affairs were split between the two departments on a geographical basis, with the Northern Department taking responsibility for Russia, Sweden, Denmark-Norway, Poland, the Netherlands, and the Holy Roman Empire. Responsibility for domestic affairs was shared between the two departments. After England united with Scotland to form the Kingdom of Great Britain, the two departments also split responsibility for Scottish affairs, except during those times when there was an appointed Secretary of State for Scotland. Responsibility for overseas military strategy was also shared between the two departments.

It was administered by the Secretary of State for the Northern Department.

In 1782, the Northern and Southern Departments were reorganised, with the Foreign Office taking over their foreign responsibilities and the Home Office taking over their domestic responsibilities (including colonies).

History of English and British government departments with responsibility for foreign affairs and those with responsibility for the colonies, dominions and the Commonwealth
Northern Department; 1660–1782; Secretaries — Undersecretaries	Southern Department; 1660–1768; Secretaries — Undersecretaries		—
Northern Department; 1660–1782; Secretaries — Undersecretaries	Southern Department; 1768–1782; Secretaries — Undersecretaries; 1782: diplomatic responsibilities transferred to new Foreign Office	Colonial Office; 1768–1782; Secretaries — Undersecretaries	—
Foreign Office; 1782–1968; Secretaries — Ministers — Undersecretaries	Home Office; 1782–1794; Secretaries — Undersecretaries		—
Foreign Office; 1782–1968; Secretaries — Ministers — Undersecretaries	War Office; 1794–1801; Secretaries — Undersecretaries		—
Foreign Office; 1782–1968; Secretaries — Ministers — Undersecretaries	War and Colonial Office; 1801–1854; Secretaries — Undersecretaries		—
Foreign Office; 1782–1968; Secretaries — Ministers — Undersecretaries	Colonial Office; 1854–1925; Secretaries — Undersecretaries		India Office; 1858–1937; Secretaries — Undersecretaries
Foreign Office; 1782–1968; Secretaries — Ministers — Undersecretaries	Colonial Office; 1925–1966; Secretaries — Ministers — Undersecretaries	Dominions Office; 1925–1947; Secretaries — Undersecretaries	India Office; 1858–1937; Secretaries — Undersecretaries
Foreign Office; 1782–1968; Secretaries — Ministers — Undersecretaries	Colonial Office; 1925–1966; Secretaries — Ministers — Undersecretaries	Dominions Office; 1925–1947; Secretaries — Undersecretaries	India Office and Burma Office; 1937–1947; Secretaries — Undersecretaries
Foreign Office; 1782–1968; Secretaries — Ministers — Undersecretaries	Colonial Office; 1925–1966; Secretaries — Ministers — Undersecretaries	Commonwealth Relations Office; 1947–1966; Secretaries — Ministers — Undersecretaries	
Foreign Office; 1782–1968; Secretaries — Ministers — Undersecretaries	Commonwealth Office; 1966–1968; Secretaries — Ministers — Undersecretaries		
Foreign and Commonwealth Office; 1968–2020; Secretaries — Ministers — Undersecretaries
Foreign, Commonwealth and Development Office; Since 2020; Secretaries — Ministers — Undersecretaries

== See also ==
- Secretaries of State for the Northern Department
