= Under-Secretary of State for Dominion Affairs =

The position of Under-Secretary of State for Dominion Affairs was a British ministerial position, subordinate to that of Secretary of State for Dominion Affairs, created in 1925. The Dominions Office dealt with British relations with the Dominions – Canada, Australia, New Zealand, South Africa, Newfoundland, and the Irish Free State. The Dominions Office also dealt with relations with Southern Rhodesia.

In 1947 the office was replaced by the Under-Secretary of State for Commonwealth Relations.

== Under-Secretaries of State for Dominion Affairs, 1925–1947 ==
- 1925: George Villiers, 6th Earl of Clarendon
- 1927: Simon Joseph Fraser, 16th Lord Lovat
- 1929: Ivor Windsor-Clive, 2nd Earl of Plymouth
- 1929: Arthur Ponsonby
- 1929: William Lunn
- 1931: Malcolm MacDonald
- 1935: Edward Stanley, Baron Stanley
- 1935: Douglas Hacking
- 1936: Edward Cavendish, Marquess of Hartington
- 1940: Geoffrey Shakespeare
- 1942: Paul Emrys-Evans
- 1945: John Parker
- 1946: Arthur Bottomley

== Permanent Under-Secretaries of State for Dominion Affairs, 1925–1947 ==
The post lasted as long as the office itself, from 1925 to 1947 with the last Permanent Under-Secretary of State for Dominion Affairs, Sir Eric Machtig, transferring in 1947 to become the Permanent Under-Secretary of State for Commonwealth Relations, jointly with A. Carter formerly of the India Office.

Name	Entered office	Left office
Sir Charles Davis	1925	1930
Sir Edward Harding	1930	1939
Sir Eric Machtig (acting)	1939	1940
Sir Cosmo Parkinson	1940	1940
Sir Eric Machtig	1940	1947

History of English and British government departments with responsibility for foreign affairs and those with responsibility for the colonies, dominions and the Commonwealth
Northern Department; 1660–1782; Secretaries — Undersecretaries	Southern Department; 1660–1768; Secretaries — Undersecretaries		—
Northern Department; 1660–1782; Secretaries — Undersecretaries	Southern Department; 1768–1782; Secretaries — Undersecretaries; 1782: diplomatic responsibilities transferred to new Foreign Office	Colonial Office; 1768–1782; Secretaries — Undersecretaries	—
Foreign Office; 1782–1968; Secretaries — Ministers — Undersecretaries	Home Office; 1782–1794; Secretaries — Undersecretaries		—
Foreign Office; 1782–1968; Secretaries — Ministers — Undersecretaries	War Office; 1794–1801; Secretaries — Undersecretaries		—
Foreign Office; 1782–1968; Secretaries — Ministers — Undersecretaries	War and Colonial Office; 1801–1854; Secretaries — Undersecretaries		—
Foreign Office; 1782–1968; Secretaries — Ministers — Undersecretaries	Colonial Office; 1854–1925; Secretaries — Undersecretaries		India Office; 1858–1937; Secretaries — Undersecretaries
Foreign Office; 1782–1968; Secretaries — Ministers — Undersecretaries	Colonial Office; 1925–1966; Secretaries — Ministers — Undersecretaries	Dominions Office; 1925–1947; Secretaries — Undersecretaries	India Office; 1858–1937; Secretaries — Undersecretaries
Foreign Office; 1782–1968; Secretaries — Ministers — Undersecretaries	Colonial Office; 1925–1966; Secretaries — Ministers — Undersecretaries	Dominions Office; 1925–1947; Secretaries — Undersecretaries	India Office and Burma Office; 1937–1947; Secretaries — Undersecretaries
Foreign Office; 1782–1968; Secretaries — Ministers — Undersecretaries	Colonial Office; 1925–1966; Secretaries — Ministers — Undersecretaries	Commonwealth Relations Office; 1947–1966; Secretaries — Ministers — Undersecretaries	
Foreign Office; 1782–1968; Secretaries — Ministers — Undersecretaries	Commonwealth Office; 1966–1968; Secretaries — Ministers — Undersecretaries		
Foreign and Commonwealth Office; 1968–2020; Secretaries — Ministers — Undersecretaries			Department for International Development; 1997–2020; Secretaries
Foreign, Commonwealth and Development Office; Since 2020; Secretaries — Ministers — Undersecretaries
