= Secretary of State for Commonwealth Relations =

UK government cabinet minister 1947–1966

The secretary of state for Commonwealth relations was a secretary of state in the Government of the United Kingdom, responsible for dealing with the United Kingdom's relations with members of the Commonwealth of Nations (its former colonies). The minister's department was the Commonwealth Relations Office (CRO).

The position was created in 1947 out of the old positions of Secretary of State for Dominion Affairs and Secretary of State for India. In 1966, the position was merged with that of the Secretary of State for the Colonies to form that of Secretary of State for Commonwealth Affairs, which was in turn merged with the Secretary of State for Foreign Affairs in 1968 to create the new position of Secretary of State for Foreign and Commonwealth Affairs. The equivalent position today is the Secretary of State for Foreign, Commonwealth and Development Affairs.

== Secretaries of state for Commonwealth relations, 1947–1966 ==
Portrait	Name	Term of office		Political party	Ministry
	Christopher Addison; 1st Viscount Addison	7 July 1947	7 October 1947	Labour	Attlee (I & II)
	Philip Noel-Baker; MP for Derby	7 October 1947	28 February 1950	Labour	Attlee (I & II)
	Patrick Gordon Walker; MP for Smethwick	28 February 1950	26 October 1951	Labour	Attlee (I & II)
	General Hastings Ismay; 1st Baron Ismay	28 October 1951	12 March 1952	–	Churchill III
	Robert Gascoyne-Cecil; 5th Marquess of Salisbury	12 March 1952	24 November 1952	Conservative	Churchill III
	Philip Cunliffe-Lister; 1st Viscount Swinton	24 November 1952	7 April 1955	Conservative	Churchill III
	Alec Douglas-Home; 14th Earl of Home	7 April 1955	27 July 1960	Conservative	Eden
	Alec Douglas-Home; 14th Earl of Home	7 April 1955	27 July 1960	Conservative	Macmillan (I & II)
	Duncan Sandys; MP for Streatham	27 July 1960	16 October 1964	Conservative	Macmillan (I & II)
	Duncan Sandys; MP for Streatham	27 July 1960	16 October 1964	Conservative	Douglas-Home
	Arthur Bottomley; MP for Middlesbrough East	18 October 1964	1 August 1966	Labour	Wilson (I & II)

== Shadow secretaries of state for commonwealth relations ==
Name	Entered office	Left office	Political party	Shadow Cabinet
Patrick Gordon Walker; MP for Smethwick	15 July 1955	15 February 1956	Labour	Attlee
Patrick Gordon Walker; MP for Smethwick	15 July 1955	15 February 1956	Labour	Gaitskell
Arthur Creech Jones; MP for Wakefield	15 February 1956	24 January 1958	Labour	Gaitskell
Arthur Bottomley; MP for Rochester and Chatham	24 January 1958	November 1959	Labour	Gaitskell
Hilary Marquand; MP for Middlesbrough East	November 1959	November 1961	Labour	Gaitskell
John Strachey; MP for Dundee West	November 1961	15 July 1963	Labour	Gaitskell
John Strachey; MP for Dundee West	November 1961	15 July 1963	Labour	Brown
John Strachey; MP for Dundee West	November 1961	15 July 1963	Labour	Wilson
Unknown	15 July 1963	16 October 1964	Labour	Wilson
Duncan Sandys; MP for Streatham	16 October 1964	5 August 1965	Conservative	Douglas-Home
Selwyn Lloyd; MP for Wirral	5 August 1965	19 April 1966	Conservative	Heath
Reginald Maudling; MP for Barnet	19 April 1966	1 August 1966	Conservative	Heath

History of English and British government departments with responsibility for foreign affairs and those with responsibility for the colonies, dominions and the Commonwealth
Northern Department; 1660–1782; Secretaries — Undersecretaries	Southern Department; 1660–1768; Secretaries — Undersecretaries		—
Northern Department; 1660–1782; Secretaries — Undersecretaries	Southern Department; 1768–1782; Secretaries — Undersecretaries; 1782: diplomatic responsibilities transferred to new Foreign Office	Colonial Office; 1768–1782; Secretaries — Undersecretaries	—
Foreign Office; 1782–1968; Secretaries — Ministers — Undersecretaries	Home Office; 1782–1794; Secretaries — Undersecretaries		—
Foreign Office; 1782–1968; Secretaries — Ministers — Undersecretaries	War Office; 1794–1801; Secretaries — Undersecretaries		—
Foreign Office; 1782–1968; Secretaries — Ministers — Undersecretaries	War and Colonial Office; 1801–1854; Secretaries — Undersecretaries		—
Foreign Office; 1782–1968; Secretaries — Ministers — Undersecretaries	Colonial Office; 1854–1925; Secretaries — Undersecretaries		India Office; 1858–1937; Secretaries — Undersecretaries
Foreign Office; 1782–1968; Secretaries — Ministers — Undersecretaries	Colonial Office; 1925–1966; Secretaries — Ministers — Undersecretaries	Dominions Office; 1925–1947; Secretaries — Undersecretaries	India Office; 1858–1937; Secretaries — Undersecretaries
Foreign Office; 1782–1968; Secretaries — Ministers — Undersecretaries	Colonial Office; 1925–1966; Secretaries — Ministers — Undersecretaries	Dominions Office; 1925–1947; Secretaries — Undersecretaries	India Office and Burma Office; 1937–1947; Secretaries — Undersecretaries
Foreign Office; 1782–1968; Secretaries — Ministers — Undersecretaries	Colonial Office; 1925–1966; Secretaries — Ministers — Undersecretaries	Commonwealth Relations Office; 1947–1966; Secretaries — Ministers — Undersecretaries	
Foreign Office; 1782–1968; Secretaries — Ministers — Undersecretaries	Commonwealth Office; 1966–1968; Secretaries — Ministers — Undersecretaries		
Foreign and Commonwealth Office; 1968–2020; Secretaries — Ministers — Undersecretaries
Foreign, Commonwealth and Development Office; Since 2020; Secretaries — Ministers — Undersecretaries
