= Foreign, Commonwealth and Development Office =

UK Government ministerial department

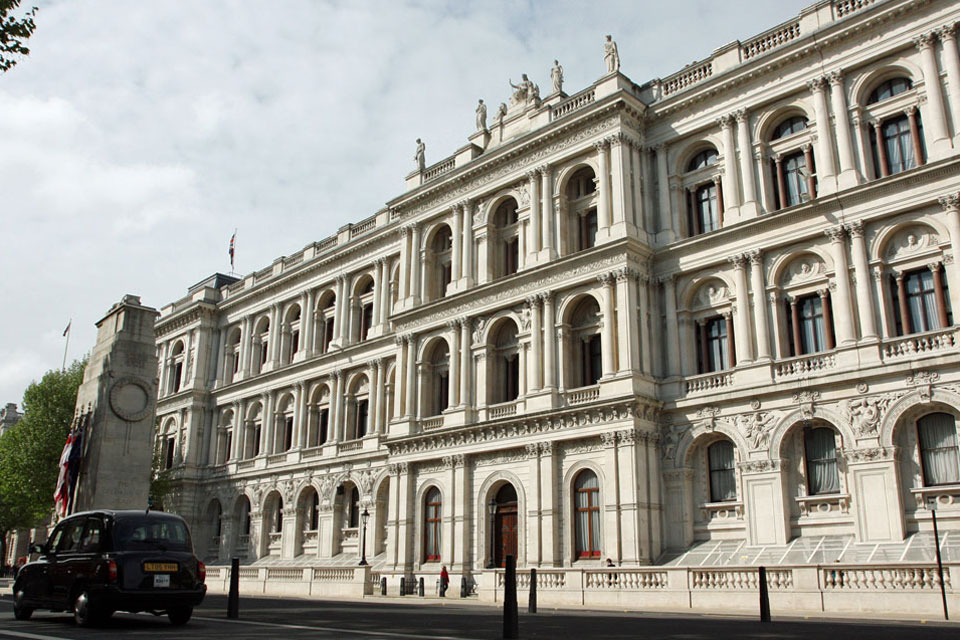
- FCDO Main Building, Westminster

Department overview
- Formed: 1782; 244 years ago (as the Foreign Office)
- Preceding agencies: Commonwealth Office; Foreign Office; Department for International Development
- Jurisdiction: Government of the United Kingdom
- Headquarters: King Charles Street, London Abercrombie House, East Kilbride
- Employees: 8,098 (2024/25)
- Annual budget: £8.172bn (resource) & £2.759bn (capital) in 2024–25
- Secretary of State responsible: Ed Miliband MP, Foreign Secretary
- Department executives: Lindy Cameron, Permanent Under-Secretary for Foreign, Commonwealth & Development Affairs and Head of HM Diplomatic Service; Nick Dyer, Second Permanent Under-Secretary for Foreign, Commonwealth & Development Affairs
- Child agencies: FCDO Services; Wilton Park
- Website: gov.uk/fcdo

The Foreign, Commonwealth and Development Office (FCDO), or Foreign Office is the ministry of foreign affairs and a ministerial department of the government of the United Kingdom.

The office was created on 2 September 2020 through the merger of the Foreign and Commonwealth Office (FCO) and the Department for International Development (DFID). The FCO was itself created in 1968 by the merger of the Foreign Office (FO) and the Commonwealth Office, with the Foreign Office itself initially being established in 1782. The department is responsible for representing and promoting British interests worldwide.

The head of the FCDO is the secretary of state for foreign, Commonwealth and development affairs, commonly abbreviated to "foreign secretary". This is regarded as one of the four most prestigious positions in the Cabinet – the Great Offices of State – alongside those of Prime Minister, Chancellor of the Exchequer and Home Secretary. Ed Miliband was appointed Foreign Secretary on 20 July 2026 as part of Andy Burnham's cabinet.

The FCDO is managed day-to-day by a civil servant, the permanent under-secretary of state for foreign affairs, who also acts as the Head of His Majesty's Diplomatic Service. Lindy Cameron took office as permanent under-secretary on 19 October 2026, succeeding Sir Oliver Robbins who was dismissed on 16 April 2026.

The expenditure, administration and policy of the FCDO are scrutinised by the Foreign Affairs Select Committee.

== Responsibilities ==
According to the FCDO website, the department's key responsibilities (as of 2020) are as follows:

- Safeguarding the UK's national security by countering terrorism and weapons proliferation, and working to reduce conflict.
- Building the UK's prosperity by increasing exports and investment, opening markets, ensuring access to resources, and promoting sustainable global growth.
- Supporting British nationals around the world through modern and efficient consular services.

In addition to those responsibilities, the FCDO is responsible for the British Overseas Territories, which had previously been administered from 1782 to 1801 by the Home Office, from 1801 to 1854 by the War and Colonial Office, from 1854 to 1966 by the Colonial Office, from 1966 to 1968 by the Commonwealth Office, and from 1968 by the Foreign and Commonwealth Office (this did not include protectorates, which fell under the purview of the Foreign Office, or to British India, which had been administered by the East India Company until 1858, and thereafter by the India Office).

This arrangement has been subject to criticism in the UK and in the overseas territories. For example, the chief minister of Anguilla, Victor Banks, said: "We are not foreign; neither are we members of the Commonwealth, so we should have a different interface with the UK that is based on mutual respect". There have been numerous suggestions on ways to improve the relationship between the overseas territories and the UK. Suggestions have included setting up a dedicated department to handle relations with the overseas territories, similarly to the French Ministry of the Overseas, or alternatively the absorption of the Overseas Territories Directorate (OTD) in the Cabinet Office, thus affording the overseas territories with better connections to the centre of government.

== Ministers ==
The FCDO ministers are as follows, with cabinet ministers in bold:

Minister	Portrait	Office	Portfolio
**Ed Miliband** MP		Secretary of State for Foreign, Commonwealth and Development Affairs	Overarching responsibility for the departmental portfolio and oversight of the ministerial team; Cabinet; National Security Council (NSC); strategy; intelligence policy; honours.
**Hamish Falconer** MP		Minister of State for Intergovernmental Relations and European Relations	
Kirsty McNeill MP		Minister of State for International Development	Africa; migration; development and humanitarian; International finance; climate and energy security; violence against women and girls
Stephen Doughty MP		Minister of State for the Middle East, North Africa, Afghanistan and Pakistan	Middle East and North Africa; Afghanistan and Pakistan; consular and crisis
Uma Kumaran MP		Parliamentary Under-Secretary of State for Overseas Territories, Caribbean, Global Tech & AI	Overseas Territories; Caribbean; global tech & AI; violence against women and girls; departmental operations
Chris Elmore MP		Parliamentary Under-Secretary of State for the Americas, Multilateral and Human Rights	Latin America; US and Canada; UN, multilateral and human rights;Commonwealth; protocol; British Council and World Service
Stewart Wood, Baron Wood of Anfield		Parliamentary Under-Secretary of State for Europe, Eastern Europe, International Security and Growth	Europe (bilateral); Eastern Europe and Central Asia; defence and international security; national and economic security; growth
Rosie Winterton, Baroness Winterton of Doncaster		Parliamentary Under-Secretary of State for Indo-Pacific	Indo-Pacific; Small Island Developing States; migration; legal and treaties

== History ==
History of English and British government departments with responsibility for foreign affairs and those with responsibility for the colonies, dominions and the Commonwealth
Northern Department; 1660–1782; Secretaries — Undersecretaries	Southern Department; 1660–1768; Secretaries — Undersecretaries		—
Northern Department; 1660–1782; Secretaries — Undersecretaries	Southern Department; 1768–1782; Secretaries — Undersecretaries; 1782: diplomatic responsibilities transferred to new Foreign Office	Colonial Office; 1768–1782; Secretaries — Undersecretaries	—
Foreign Office; 1782–1968; Secretaries — Ministers — Undersecretaries	Home Office; 1782–1794; Secretaries — Undersecretaries		—
Foreign Office; 1782–1968; Secretaries — Ministers — Undersecretaries	War Office; 1794–1801; Secretaries — Undersecretaries		—
Foreign Office; 1782–1968; Secretaries — Ministers — Undersecretaries	War and Colonial Office; 1801–1854; Secretaries — Undersecretaries		—
Foreign Office; 1782–1968; Secretaries — Ministers — Undersecretaries	Colonial Office; 1854–1925; Secretaries — Undersecretaries		India Office; 1858–1937; Secretaries — Undersecretaries
Foreign Office; 1782–1968; Secretaries — Ministers — Undersecretaries	Colonial Office; 1925–1966; Secretaries — Ministers — Undersecretaries	Dominions Office; 1925–1947; Secretaries — Undersecretaries	India Office; 1858–1937; Secretaries — Undersecretaries
Foreign Office; 1782–1968; Secretaries — Ministers — Undersecretaries	Colonial Office; 1925–1966; Secretaries — Ministers — Undersecretaries	Dominions Office; 1925–1947; Secretaries — Undersecretaries	India Office and Burma Office; 1937–1947; Secretaries — Undersecretaries
Foreign Office; 1782–1968; Secretaries — Ministers — Undersecretaries	Colonial Office; 1925–1966; Secretaries — Ministers — Undersecretaries	Commonwealth Relations Office; 1947–1966; Secretaries — Ministers — Undersecretaries	
Foreign Office; 1782–1968; Secretaries — Ministers — Undersecretaries	Commonwealth Office; 1966–1968; Secretaries — Ministers — Undersecretaries		
Foreign and Commonwealth Office; 1968–2020; Secretaries — Ministers — Undersecretaries			Department for International Development; 1997–2020; Secretaries
Foreign, Commonwealth and Development Office; Since 2020; Secretaries — Ministers — Undersecretaries

=== Eighteenth century ===
The Foreign Office was formed in March 1782 by combining the Southern and Northern Departments of the secretary of state, each of which covered both foreign and domestic affairs in their parts of the kingdom. The two departments' foreign affairs responsibilities became the Foreign Office, whilst their domestic affairs responsibilities were assigned to the Home Office. The Home Office is technically the senior.

=== Nineteenth century ===
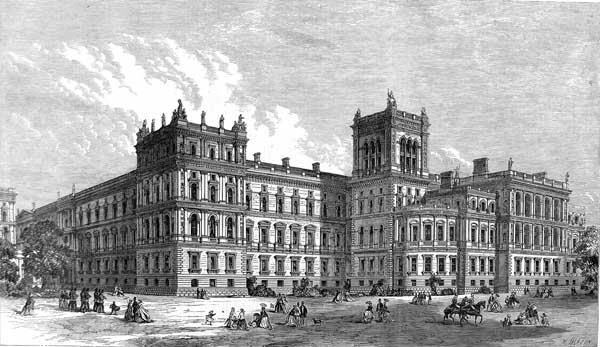
The western end of the FCDO Main Building in 1866, facing St James's Park. It was then occupied by the Foreign and India Offices, while the Home and Colonial Offices occupied the Whitehall end.

During the 19th century, it was not infrequent for the Foreign Office to approach The Times newspaper and ask for continental intelligence, which was often superior to that conveyed by official sources. Examples of journalists who specialized in foreign affairs and were well connected to politicians included: Henry Southern, Valentine Chirol, Harold Nicolson, and Robert Bruce Lockhart.

=== Twentieth century ===
During the First World War, the Arab Bureau was set up within the British Foreign Office as a section of the Cairo Intelligence Department. During the early Cold War an important department was the Information Research Department (IRD) which was used to create propaganda against socialist and anti-colonial movements. In 1922 after the end of the First World War the recently created Government Code and Cypher School moved from the Admiralty to the Foreign Office.

The Foreign Office hired its first woman diplomat, Monica Milne, in 1946.

=== The Foreign and Commonwealth Office (1968–2020) ===
The FCO was formed on 17 October 1968, from the merger of the short-lived Commonwealth Office and the Foreign Office. The Commonwealth Office had been created only in 1966, by the merger of the Commonwealth Relations Office and the Colonial Office, the Commonwealth Relations Office having been formed by the merger of the Dominions Office and the India Office in 1947—with the Dominions Office having been split from the Colonial Office in 1925.

The Foreign and Commonwealth Office held responsibility for international development issues between 1970 and 1974, and again between 1979 and 1997.

The National Archives website contains a government timeline to show the departments responsible for foreign and commonwealth affairs from 1945.

==== Under New Labour (1997–2010) ====
From 1997, international development became the responsibility of the separate Department for International Development.

When David Miliband took over as Foreign Secretary in June 2007, he set in hand a review of the FCO's strategic priorities. One of the key messages of these discussions was the conclusion that the existing framework of ten international strategic priorities, dating from 2003, was no longer appropriate. Although the framework had been useful in helping the FCO plan its work and allocate its resources, there was agreement that it needed a new framework to drive its work forward.

The new strategic framework consists of three core elements:

- A flexible global network of staff and offices, serving the whole of the UK Government.
- Three essential services that support the British economy, British nationals abroad and managed migration for Britain. These services are delivered through UK Trade & Investment (UKTI), consular teams in Britain and overseas, and UK Visas and Immigration.
- Four policy goals:
  - countering terrorism and weapons proliferation and their causes
  - preventing and resolving conflict
  - promoting a low-carbon, high-growth, global economy
  - developing effective international institutions, in particular the United Nations and the European Union.

In August 2005, a report by management consultant group Collinson Grant was made public by Andrew Mackinlay. The report severely criticised the FCO's management structure, noting:

- The Foreign Office could be "slow to act".
- Delegation is lacking within the management structure.
- Accountability was poor.
- The FCO could feasibly cut 1,200 jobs.
- At least £48 million could be saved annually.

The Foreign Office commissioned the report to highlight areas which would help it achieve its pledge to reduce spending by £87 million over three years. In response to the report being made public, the Foreign Office stated it had already implemented the report's recommendations.

In 2009, Gordon Brown created the position of Chief Scientific Adviser (CSA) to the FCO. The first science adviser was David Clary.

On 25 April 2010, the department apologised after The Sunday Telegraph obtained a "foolish" document calling for the upcoming September visit of Pope Benedict XVI to be marked by the launch of "Benedict-branded" condoms, the opening of an abortion clinic and the blessing of a same-sex marriage.

==== Coalition and Conservatives (2010–2020) ====
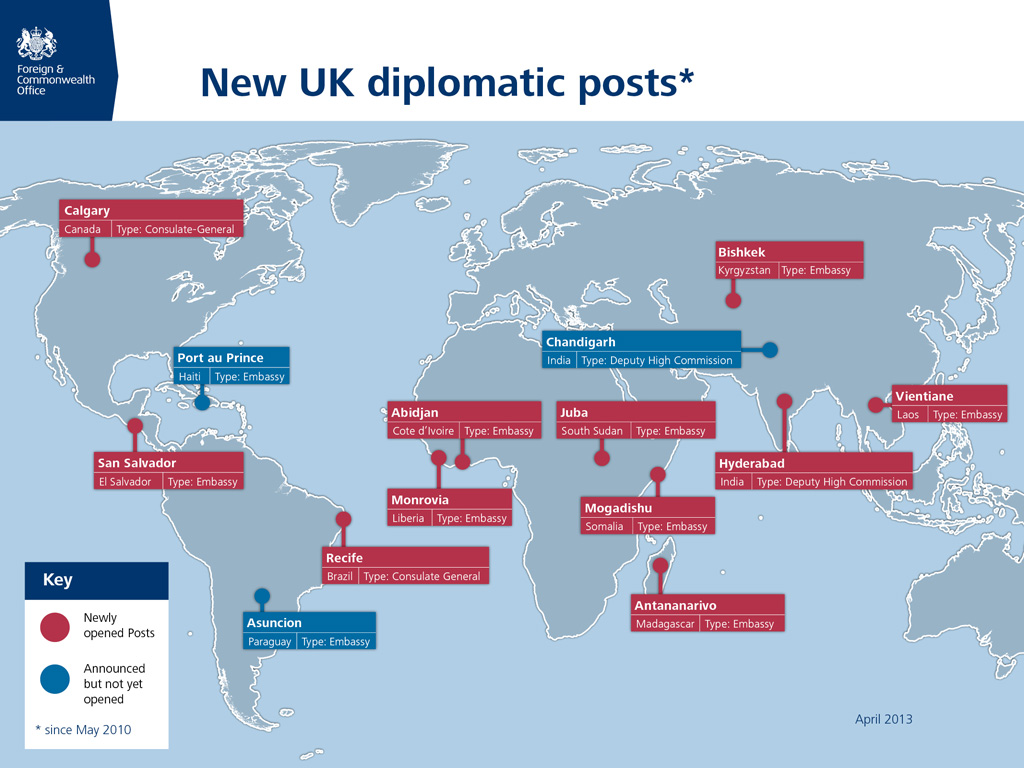
New UK Diplomatic Posts – April 2013

In 2012, the Foreign Office was criticised by Gerald Steinberg of the Jerusalem-based research institute NGO Monitor, saying that the Foreign Office and the Department for International Development provided more than £500,000 in funding to Palestinian NGOs which he said "promote political attacks on Israel". In response, a spokesman for the Foreign Office said "we are very careful about who and what we fund. The objective of our funding is to support efforts to achieve a two-state solution. Funding a particular project for a limited period of time does not mean that we endorse every single action or public comment made by an NGO or by its employees."

In September 2012, the FCO and the Canadian Department of Foreign Affairs signed a Memorandum of Understanding on diplomatic cooperation, which promotes the co-location of embassies, the joint provision of consular services, and common crisis response. The project has been criticised for further diminishing the UK's influence in Europe.

In 2011, the then foreign secretary, William Hague, announced the government's intention to open a number of new diplomatic posts in order to enhance the UK's overseas network. As such, eight new embassies and six new consulates were opened around the world.

=== Foreign, Commonwealth and Development Office (2020–2022) ===
On 16 June 2020, Prime Minister Boris Johnson announced the merger of the FCO with the Department for International Development. This was following the decision in the February 2020 cabinet reshuffle to give cross-departmental briefs to all junior ministers in the Department for International Development and the Foreign Office. The merger, which created the Foreign, Commonwealth and Development Office, took place in September 2020 with a stated aim of ensuring that aid is spent "in line with the UK's priorities overseas". The merger was criticised by three former prime ministers – Gordon Brown, Tony Blair and David Cameron – with Cameron saying that it would mean "less respect for the UK overseas". The chief executive of Save the Children, Kevin Watkins, called it "reckless, irresponsible and a dereliction of UK leadership" that "threatens to reverse hard-won gains in child survival, nutrition and poverty".

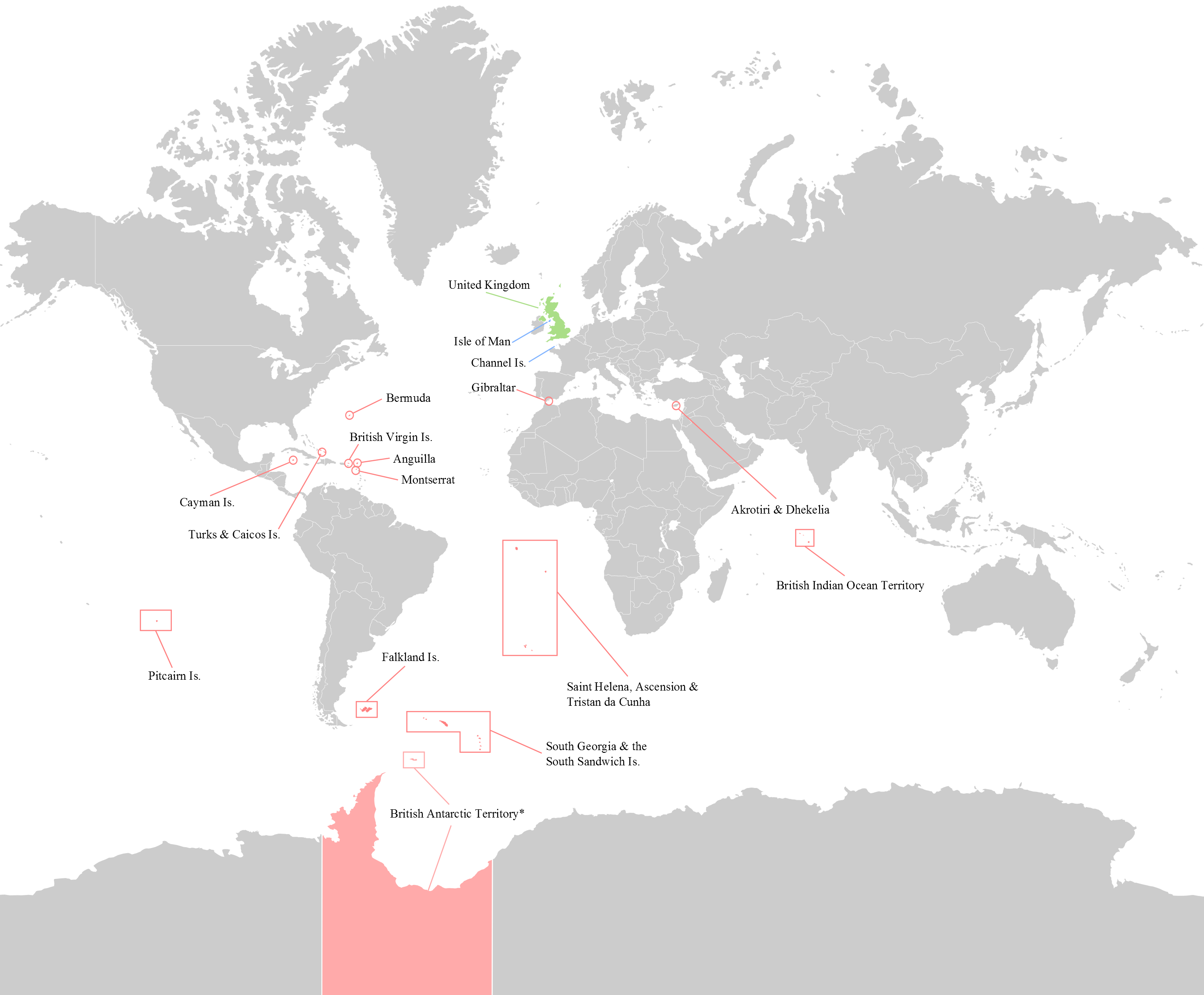
A map of the UK, British Overseas Territories & Crown Dependencies

In November 2021, it was reported that an employment tribunal had ruled that the FCDO had racially discriminated against Sonia Warner, a black senior civil servant, by treating her unfairly in a disciplinary process.

On 21 February 2022, UK Minister for Africa Vicky Ford announced a new £74 million financial package to support women entrepreneurs across Nigeria, who own businesses and small and medium enterprises (SMEs).

In 2022, Maria Bamieh settled an employment claim against the Foreign Office for more than £400,000 shortly before her claim was due to be heard by an employment tribunal. She said that the Foreign Office failed to support her when she attempted to expose corruption at the EU's rule of law mission (EULEX). The Foreign Office said: "We have agreed to settle this long-running case without any admission of liability and continue to strongly refute these allegations."

== International Academy ==
Following a prior announcement by the then Foreign Secretary William Hague, the Diplomatic Academy was established in February 2015. The centre was established in order to create a cross-government centre of excellence for all civil servants working on international issues. The academy serves to broaden the department's network and engage in collaborative work with academic and diplomatic partners. The institution was renamed the International Academy as part of the 2020 creation of the Foreign, Commonwealth and Development Office.

== Programme Funds ==
The FCDO, through its core departmental budget, funds projects which are in line with its policy priorities outlined in its Single Departmental Plan. This funding includes both Official Development Assistance (ODA), and non-ODA funds. The funds are used for a wide range of projects and serve to support traditional diplomatic activities.

The FCDO plays a key role in delivering two, major UK government funds which work to support the government's National Security Strategy and Aid Strategy.

- The Conflict, Stability and Security Fund (CSSF) – Used to support cross-governmental efforts at reducing conflict-related risks in countries which the UK has important interests.
- The Prosperity Fund – Supports economic development and reform in the UK's partner countries.
- The Global Innovation Fund – Invests in evidence-based innovations with the potential to positively impact the lives of people living on less than $5 per day.

The FCDO also supports a number of academic funds:

- Chevening scholarships
- Marshall scholarships
- Domestic Programme Fund
- Overseas Territories Environment and Climate Fund (Darwin Plus)
- Science and Innovation Network

=== 2021 aid budget cuts ===
In 2021, the UK government cut its overseas aid budget from 0.7% to 0.5% of Gross National Income despite UK legislation against such a move. These cuts, amounting to £4 billion, reduced funding for humanitarian intervention by 44% in places like Yemen and Syria. It also cut funding for the fight against polio, malaria and HIV/AIDS. Funding for girls education worldwide was also reduced by 25%.

=== Investments ===
The Global Innovation Fund (GIF) announced the first two investments made under its 'Innovating for Climate Resilience fund', which was launched at COP26 with support from the UK's Foreign Commonwealth and Development Office (FCDO) and in partnership with the Adaptation Research Alliance and the Global Resilience Partnership.

=== UNRWA funding ===
According to the FCDO and Foreign Secretary, the UK committed over £100 million in aid to the OPTs (Occupied Palestinian territories) for the 2023/2024 period, of which £35 million was specifically provided to UNRWA before it was suspended in January 2024. The funding was suspended after allegations surfaced that members of staff at UNRWA had been involved in the 7 October attacks by Hamas in Israel in 2023; however, in July 2024, UK Foreign Secretary David Lammy announced that the UK would resume funding to UNRWA.

== FCDO Services ==
In April 2006, a new executive agency was established, FCO Services (now FCDO Services), to provide corporate service functions. It moved to Trading Fund status in April 2008, so that it had the ability to provide services similar to those it already offers to the FCDO to other government departments and even to outside businesses.

As of 2017, Sir Simon Gass is Non-Executive Director and Chair of the FCDO Services Board.

FCDO Services operates globally in 250 destinations across 168 countries; with office regions covering Asia & Pacific, Europe & Central Asia, Middle East & Africa and The Americas.

The services FCDO Services offer are "Digital and Cloud", "Securing your Buildings and Spaces", "Logistics", "Translation and Interpreting" and "Technical Security from UK NACE".

It is accountable to the Secretary of State for Foreign, Commonwealth and Development Affairs, and provides secure support services to the FCDO, other government departments and foreign governments and bodies with which the UK has close links.

Since 2011, FCDO Services has been developing the Government Secure Application Environment (GSAE) on a secure cloud computing platform to support UK government organisations. It also manages the UK National Authority for Counter Eavesdropping (UK NACE) which helps protect UK assets from physical, electronic and cyber attack.

FCDO Services is a public sector organisation, it is not funded by the public and has to rely on the income it produces to meet its costs, by providing services on a commercial basis to customers both in the UK and throughout the world. Its accounting officer and chief executive is accountable to the secretary of state for foreign, Commonwealth and development affairs and to Parliament, for the organisation's performance and conduct.

== Global Response Office ==
The FCDO Global Response Office operates 24/7, every day of the year. It takes calls from British Nationals overseas, usually in emergency situations such as lost passports, hospitalisations, deaths and arrests.

== Library of the Foreign and Commonwealth Office and Records Department ==
The historical records of the FCO was transferred to a permanent loan to King's College London in 2007, likely from the review to reduce due to cost reduction of non-core activities at the FCO. The collection consists of 90,000 artifacts from the early 16th century (mainly of Tudor England) to present.

== Buildings ==
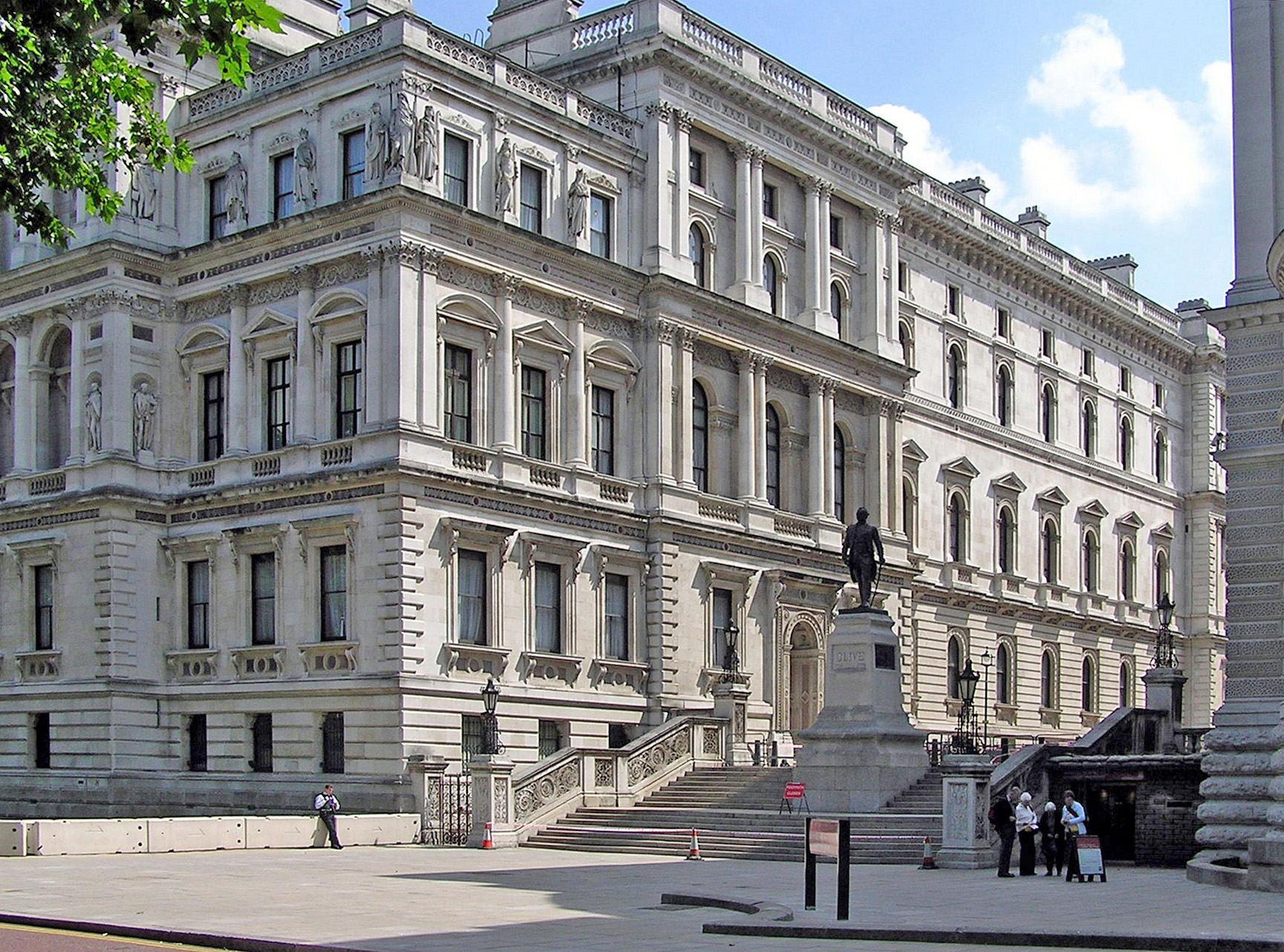
The FCDO Joint Headquarters King Charles Street viewed from Horse Guards Road, with the Statue of Robert Clive and the entrance to the Churchill War Rooms visible

As well as embassies abroad, the FCDO has premises within the UK:

- Foreign and Commonwealth Office Joint Headquarters Kings Charles Street, Whitehall, King Charles St, London
- Joint Headquarters Abercrombie House, East Kilbride
- Hanslope Park, Hanslope, Milton Keynes. Location of FCDO Services, HMGCC and Technical Security Department of the UK Secret Intelligence Service)
- Lancaster House, St James's, London. A mansion in the St James's district in the West End of London which the Foreign Office holds on lease from the Crown. It is used primarily for hospitality, entertaining foreign dignitaries and housing the Government Wine Cellar.

The FCO formerly also used the following building:

- Old Admiralty Building, Whitehall, London

=== Main Building ===
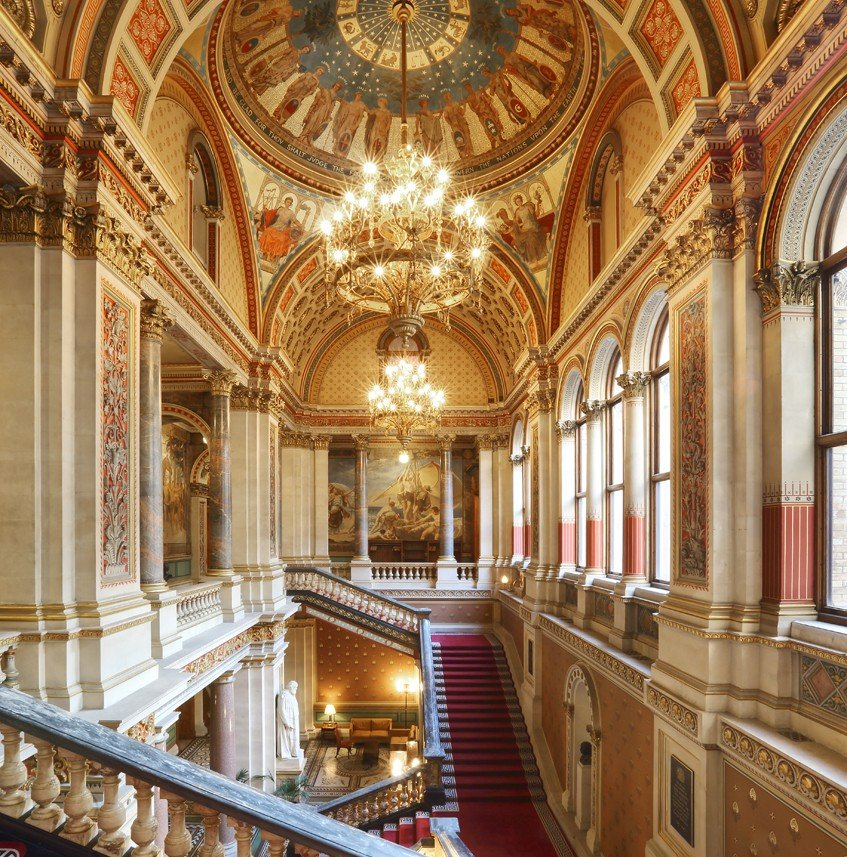
The Grand Staircase which houses Sigismund Goetze's Empire Murals

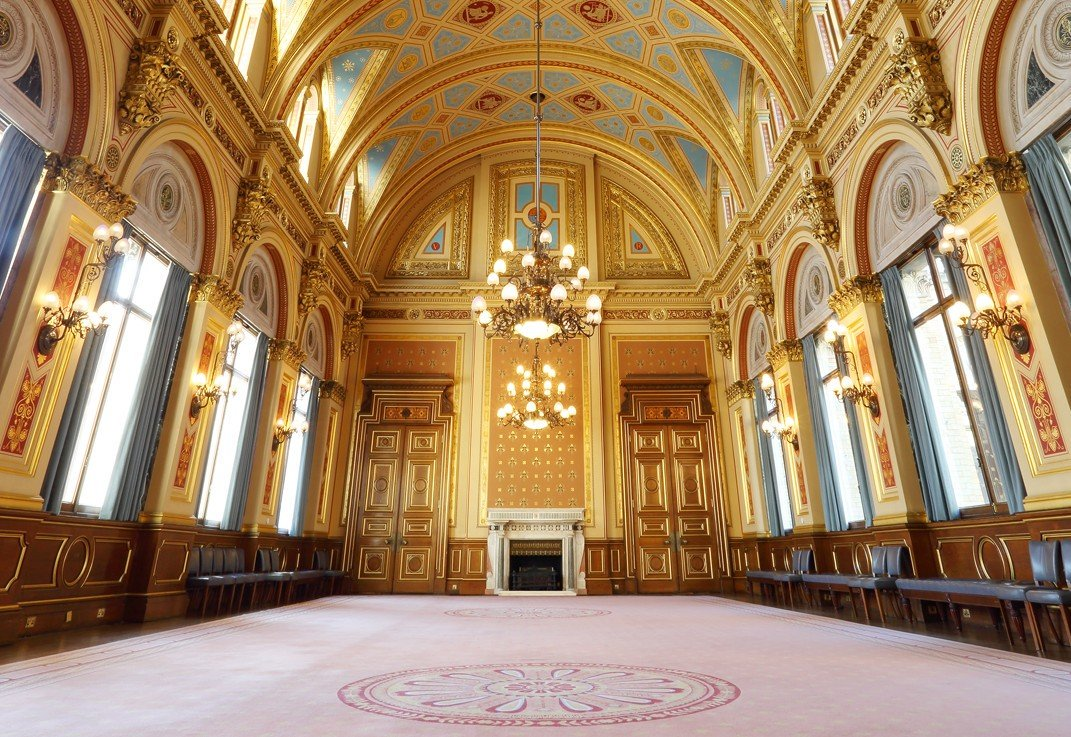
The Grand Locarno Room

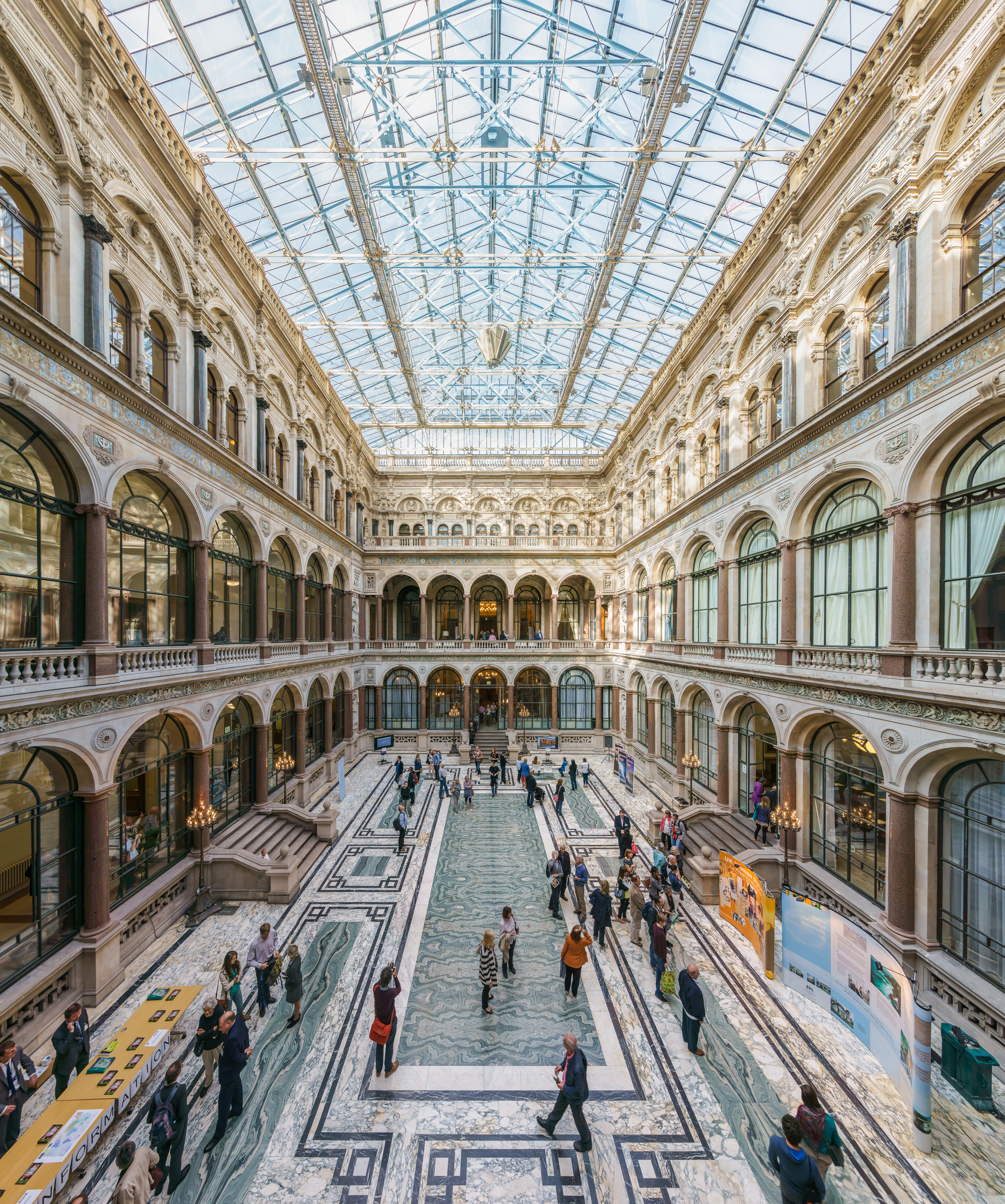
The Durbar Court at the former India Office, now part of the FCDO

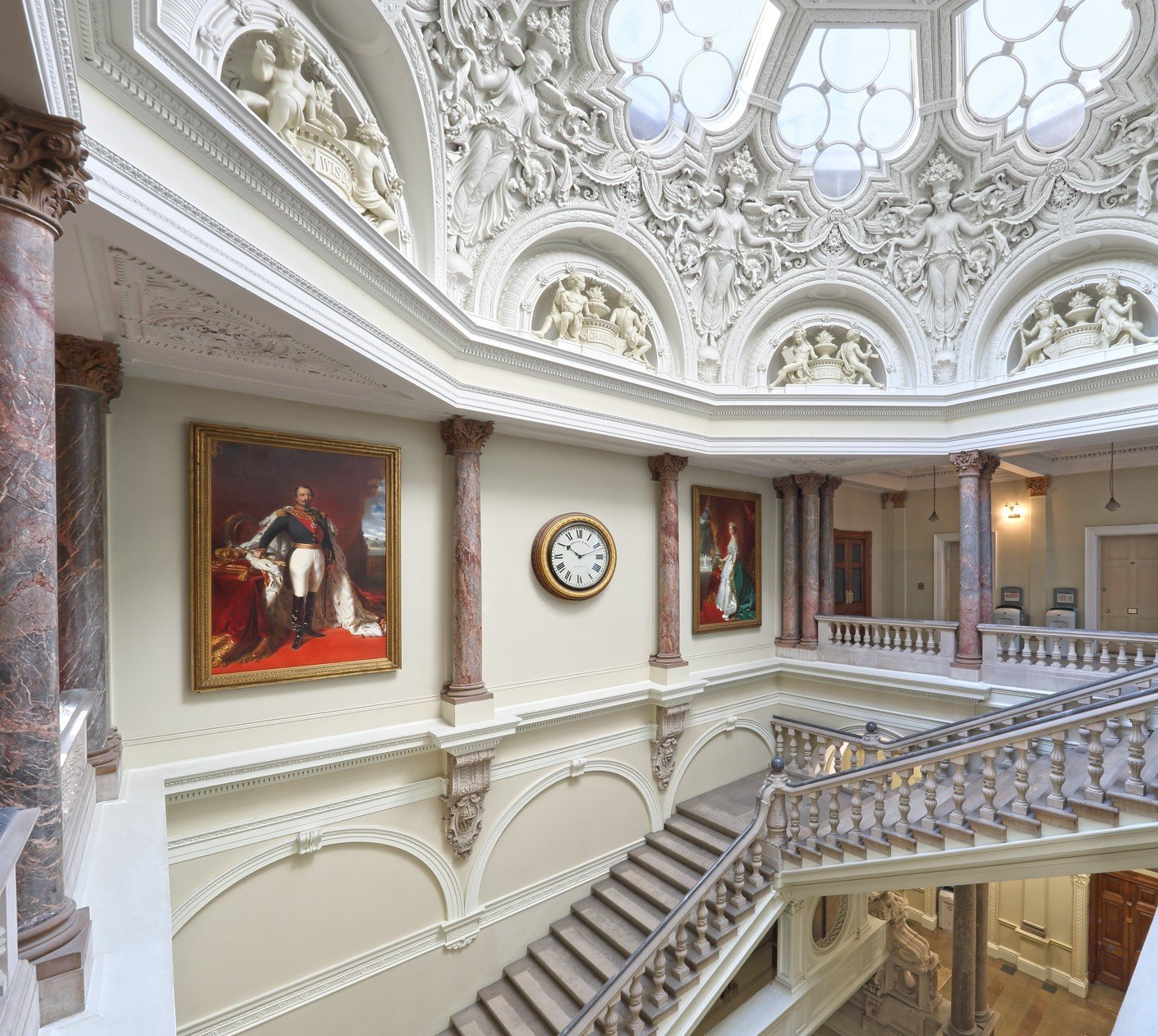
The Muse Staircase

The Foreign, Commonwealth and Development Office occupies a building which originally provided premises for four separate government departments: the Foreign Office, the India Office, the Colonial Office, and the Home Office. Construction on the building began in 1861 and finished in 1868, on the plot of land bounded by Whitehall, King Charles Street, Horse Guards Road and Downing Street. The building was designed by the architect George Gilbert Scott. Its architecture is in the Italianate style; Scott had initially envisaged a Gothic design, but Lord Palmerston, then prime minister, insisted on a classical style. The English sculptors Henry Hugh Armstead and John Birnie Philip produced a number of allegorical figures ("Art", "Law", "Commerce", etc.) for the exterior.

In 1925 the Foreign Office played host to the signing of the Locarno Treaties, aimed at reducing tension in Europe. The ceremony took place in a suite of rooms that had been designed for banqueting, which subsequently became known as the Locarno Suite. During the Second World War, the Locarno Suite's fine furnishings were removed or covered up, and it became home to a Foreign Office code-breaking department.

Due to increasing numbers of staff, the offices became increasingly cramped and much of the fine Victorian interior was covered over—especially after the Second World War. In the 1960s, demolition was proposed, as part of major redevelopment plan for the area drawn up by the architect Leslie Martin. A subsequent public outcry prevented these proposals from ever being implemented. Instead, the Foreign Office became a Grade I listed building in 1970. In 1978, the Home Office moved to a new building, easing overcrowding.

With a new sense of the building's historical value, it underwent a 17-year, £100 million restoration process, completed in 1997. The Locarno Suite, used as offices and storage since the Second World War, was fully restored for use in international conferences. The building is now open to the public each year over Open House Weekend.

In 2014 refurbishment to accommodate all Foreign and Commonwealth Office employees into one building was started by Mace.

== Devolution ==
International relations are handled centrally from Whitehall on behalf of the whole of the United Kingdom and its dependencies. However, the devolved administrations also maintain an overseas presence in the European Union, the U.S. and China alongside British diplomatic missions. These offices aim to promote their own economies and ensure that devolved interests are taken into account in British foreign policy. Ministers from devolved administrations can attend international negotiations when agreed with the British Government, e.g. EU fisheries negotiations.

== See also ==
- Foreign and Commonwealth Office Migrated Archives
- Palmerston (cat), former resident Chief Mouser of the Foreign and Commonwealth Office
- Office for Conflict, Stabilisation and Mediation
- List of development aid agencies
