= Secretary of State for Dominion Affairs =

UK government cabinet minister; 1925–1947

- Royal Arms as used by His Majesty's Government
- Style: The Right Honourable
- Appointer: The Monarch (on the advice of the Prime Minister)
- Term length: At His Majesty's pleasure
- Inaugural holder: Leo Amery
- Formation: 11 June 1925
- Final holder: The Viscount Addison
- Abolished: 7 July 1947
- Deputy: Under-Secretary of State for Dominion Affairs

The position of secretary of state for dominion affairs was a secretary of state in the Government of the United Kingdom, responsible for British relations with the Empire’s dominions – Canada, Australia, New Zealand, South Africa, Newfoundland, and the Irish Free State – and the self-governing Crown colony of Southern Rhodesia.

When initially created in 1925, the office was held in tandem with that of secretary of state for the colonies; this arrangement persisted until June 1930. On two subsequent occasions the offices were briefly held by the same person.

The secretary of state was supported by an under-secretary of state for dominion affairs. In 1947, the name of the office was changed to the secretary of state for commonwealth relations.

== Secretaries of state for dominion affairs, 1925–1947 ==
Conservative Labour National Labour
Portrait	Name Honorifics & constituency	Term of office		Political party	Prime Minister	Foreign Secretary
	Leo Amery; MP for Birmingham Sparkbrook (also Sec.State for the Colonies)	11 June 1925	4 June 1929	Conservative	Baldwin	Chamberlain
	Sidney Webb, 1st Baron Passfield (also Sec.State for the Colonies)	7 June 1929	5 June 1930	Labour	MacDonald	Henderson
	James Henry Thomas; MP for Derby (also Sec.State for the Colonies, Aug–Nov 1931)	5 June 1930	22 November 1935	Labour	MacDonald	Henderson
	James Henry Thomas; MP for Derby (also Sec.State for the Colonies, Aug–Nov 1931)	5 June 1930	22 November 1935	National Labour	MacDonald	Reading Simon
	Malcolm MacDonald; MP for Ross and Cromarty	22 November 1935	16 May 1938	National Labour	Baldwin	Hoare Eden
	Malcolm MacDonald; MP for Ross and Cromarty	22 November 1935	16 May 1938	National Labour	Chamberlain	Hoare Eden
	Edward Stanley, Lord Stanley; MP for Fylde	16 May 1938	16 October 1938†	Conservative	Chamberlain	Halifax
	Malcolm MacDonald; MP for Ross and Cromarty (also Sec.State for the Colonies)	31 October 1938	29 January 1939	National Labour	Chamberlain	Halifax
	Sir Thomas Inskip; MP for Fareham	29 January 1939	3 September 1939	Conservative	Chamberlain	Halifax
	Anthony Eden; MP for Warwick and Leamington	3 September 1939	14 May 1940	Conservative	Chamberlain	Halifax
	Thomas Inskip, 1st Viscount Caldecote	14 May 1940	3 October 1940	Conservative	Churchill	Halifax
	Robert Gascoyne-Cecil, Viscount Cranborne; MP for South Dorset until 1941; Baron Cecil of Essendon after 1941	3 October 1940	19 February 1942	Conservative	Churchill	Eden
	Clement Attlee; MP for Limehouse	19 February 1942	24 September 1943	Labour	Churchill	Eden
	Robert Gascoyne-Cecil, Viscount Cranborne; Baron Cecil of Essendon	24 September 1943	26 July 1945	Conservative	Churchill	Eden
	Christopher Addison, 1st Viscount Addison	3 August 1945	7 July 1947	Labour	Attlee	Bevin

Viscount Addison took up the new post of secretary of state for commonwealth relations on 7 July 1947.

== Notes ==
History of English and British government departments with responsibility for foreign affairs and those with responsibility for the colonies, dominions and the Commonwealth
Northern Department; 1660–1782; Secretaries — Undersecretaries	Southern Department; 1660–1768; Secretaries — Undersecretaries		—
Northern Department; 1660–1782; Secretaries — Undersecretaries	Southern Department; 1768–1782; Secretaries — Undersecretaries; 1782: diplomatic responsibilities transferred to new Foreign Office	Colonial Office; 1768–1782; Secretaries — Undersecretaries	—
Foreign Office; 1782–1968; Secretaries — Ministers — Undersecretaries	Home Office; 1782–1794; Secretaries — Undersecretaries		—
Foreign Office; 1782–1968; Secretaries — Ministers — Undersecretaries	War Office; 1794–1801; Secretaries — Undersecretaries		—
Foreign Office; 1782–1968; Secretaries — Ministers — Undersecretaries	War and Colonial Office; 1801–1854; Secretaries — Undersecretaries		—
Foreign Office; 1782–1968; Secretaries — Ministers — Undersecretaries	Colonial Office; 1854–1925; Secretaries — Undersecretaries		India Office; 1858–1937; Secretaries — Undersecretaries
Foreign Office; 1782–1968; Secretaries — Ministers — Undersecretaries	Colonial Office; 1925–1966; Secretaries — Ministers — Undersecretaries	Dominions Office; 1925–1947; Secretaries — Undersecretaries	India Office; 1858–1937; Secretaries — Undersecretaries
Foreign Office; 1782–1968; Secretaries — Ministers — Undersecretaries	Colonial Office; 1925–1966; Secretaries — Ministers — Undersecretaries	Dominions Office; 1925–1947; Secretaries — Undersecretaries	India Office and Burma Office; 1937–1947; Secretaries — Undersecretaries
Foreign Office; 1782–1968; Secretaries — Ministers — Undersecretaries	Colonial Office; 1925–1966; Secretaries — Ministers — Undersecretaries	Commonwealth Relations Office; 1947–1966; Secretaries — Ministers — Undersecretaries	
Foreign Office; 1782–1968; Secretaries — Ministers — Undersecretaries	Commonwealth Office; 1966–1968; Secretaries — Ministers — Undersecretaries		
Foreign and Commonwealth Office; 1968–2020; Secretaries — Ministers — Undersecretaries
Foreign, Commonwealth and Development Office; Since 2020; Secretaries — Ministers — Undersecretaries
