= Under-Secretary of State for War and the Colonies =

Junior Ministerial post in the United Kingdom government

The Under-Secretary of State for War and the Colonies was a junior Ministerial post in the United Kingdom government, subordinate to the Secretary of State for War and the Colonies.

In 1801 the offices of Under-Secretary of State for War and Under-Secretary of State for the Colonies were merged to create the new office. They were separated again in 1854.

== Under-Secretaries of State for War and the Colonies, 1801-1854 ==
Name	Entered office	Left office
John Sullivan	1801	1804
Edward Cooke	1804	1806
Sir George Shee, 1st Baronet and Sir James Cockburn, 9th Baronet	1806	1807
Edward Cooke and Charles Stewart	1807	1809
Frederick Robinson and Charles Jenkinson	1809	1809
Charles Jenkinson and Henry Bunbury	1809	1810
Henry Bunbury and Robert Peel	1810	1812
Henry Bunbury and Henry Goulburn	1812	1816
Henry Goulburn	1816	1821
R. W. Horton	1821	1827
Edward Stanley	1827	1828
Lord Francis Leveson-Gower	1828	1828
Horace Twiss	1828	1830
Henry Grey, Viscount Howick	1830	1833
Sir John George Shaw-Lefevre	1833	1834
Sir George Grey, 2nd Baronet	1834	1834
John Stuart-Wortley	1834	1835
William Ewart Gladstone	1835	1835
Sir George Grey, 2nd Baronet	1835	1839
Henry Labouchere	1839	1839
Robert Vernon Smith	1839	1841
George William Hope	1841	1846
George Lyttelton, 4th Baron Lyttelton	1846	1846
Benjamin Hawes	1846	1851
Frederick Peel	1851	1852
John Cuffe, 3rd Earl of Desart	1852	1852
Frederick Peel	1852	1854

Separate posts of Under-Secretary of State for War and Under-Secretary of State for the Colonies re-established 1854

History of English and British government departments with responsibility for foreign affairs and those with responsibility for the colonies, dominions and the Commonwealth
Northern Department; 1660–1782; Secretaries — Undersecretaries	Southern Department; 1660–1768; Secretaries — Undersecretaries		—
Northern Department; 1660–1782; Secretaries — Undersecretaries	Southern Department; 1768–1782; Secretaries — Undersecretaries; 1782: diplomatic responsibilities transferred to new Foreign Office	Colonial Office; 1768–1782; Secretaries — Undersecretaries	—
Foreign Office; 1782–1968; Secretaries — Ministers — Undersecretaries	Home Office; 1782–1794; Secretaries — Undersecretaries		—
Foreign Office; 1782–1968; Secretaries — Ministers — Undersecretaries	War Office; 1794–1801; Secretaries — Undersecretaries		—
Foreign Office; 1782–1968; Secretaries — Ministers — Undersecretaries	War and Colonial Office; 1801–1854; Secretaries — Undersecretaries		—
Foreign Office; 1782–1968; Secretaries — Ministers — Undersecretaries	Colonial Office; 1854–1925; Secretaries — Undersecretaries		India Office; 1858–1937; Secretaries — Undersecretaries
Foreign Office; 1782–1968; Secretaries — Ministers — Undersecretaries	Colonial Office; 1925–1966; Secretaries — Ministers — Undersecretaries	Dominions Office; 1925–1947; Secretaries — Undersecretaries	India Office; 1858–1937; Secretaries — Undersecretaries
Foreign Office; 1782–1968; Secretaries — Ministers — Undersecretaries	Colonial Office; 1925–1966; Secretaries — Ministers — Undersecretaries	Dominions Office; 1925–1947; Secretaries — Undersecretaries	India Office and Burma Office; 1937–1947; Secretaries — Undersecretaries
Foreign Office; 1782–1968; Secretaries — Ministers — Undersecretaries	Colonial Office; 1925–1966; Secretaries — Ministers — Undersecretaries	Commonwealth Relations Office; 1947–1966; Secretaries — Ministers — Undersecretaries	
Foreign Office; 1782–1968; Secretaries — Ministers — Undersecretaries	Commonwealth Office; 1966–1968; Secretaries — Ministers — Undersecretaries		
Foreign and Commonwealth Office; 1968–2020; Secretaries — Ministers — Undersecretaries
Foreign, Commonwealth and Development Office; Since 2020; Secretaries — Ministers — Undersecretaries
