= Colonial Office =

Former UK government ministry

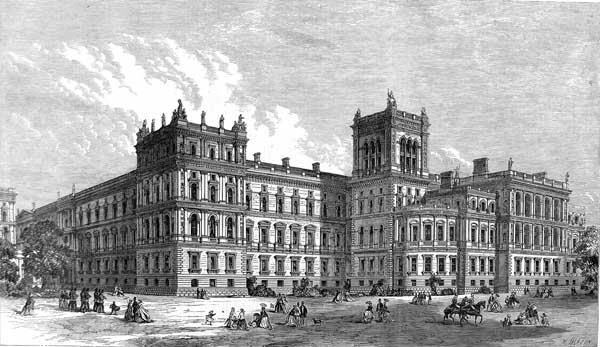
The Whitehall headquarters of the Foreign, India, Home, and Colonial Offices in 1866. It was at that time occupied by all four government departments; it presently serves a single department, now called the Foreign, Commonwealth and Development Office.

The Colonial Office was a government department of the Kingdom of Great Britain and later of the United Kingdom, first created in 1768 from the Southern Department to deal with colonial affairs in North America (particularly the Thirteen Colonies, as well as the Canadian territories recently won from France), until merged into the new Home Office in 1782. In 1801, colonial affairs were transferred to the War Office in the lead up to the Napoleonic Wars, which became the War and Colonial Office to oversee and protect the colonies of the British Empire. The Colonial Office was re-created as a separate department in 1854, under the colonial secretary. It was finally merged into the Commonwealth Office in 1966.

Despite its name, the Colonial Office was responsible for much, but not all, of Britain's Imperial territories; the protectorates fell under the purview of the Foreign Office, and the British Presidencies in India were ruled by the East India Company until 1858, when the India Office was formed to oversee the administration of the new Viceroyalty of India (the Crown ruled India directly through a Viceroy after the Indian Rebellion), while the role of the Colonial Office in the affairs of the Dominions was replaced by the Dominion Office in 1925.

The department for much of its history was headed by the Secretary of State for the Colonies, known informally as the Colonial Secretary.

== First Colonial Office (1768–1782) ==
Prior to 1768, responsibility for the affairs of the British colonies was part of the duties of the Secretary of State for the Southern Department and a committee of the Privy Council known as the Board of Trade and Plantations. Separately, the Indian Department was responsible for relations with indigenous nations in North America from 1755 onwards.

In 1768 the separate American or Colonial Department was established, in order to deal with colonial affairs in British America. With the loss of thirteen of its colonies, however, the department was abolished in 1782. Responsibility for the remaining colonies was given to the Home Office, and subsequently in 1801 transferred to the War Department.

== War and Colonial Office (1801–1854) ==
The War Office was renamed the War and Colonial Office in 1801, under a new Secretary of State for War and the Colonies, to reflect the increasing importance of the colonies. In 1825 a new post of Under-Secretary of State for the Colonies was created within this office. It was held by Robert William Hay initially. His successors were James Stephen, Herman Merivale, Frederic Rogers, Robert Herbert and Robert Henry Meade.

From 1824, the British Empire (excepting India, which was administered separately by the East India Company and then the India Office) was divided by the War and Colonial Office into the following administrative departments:

=== North America ===
- Bermuda
- British North America (part of which became the Province of Canada in the 1840s)
- Newfoundland

=== West Indies ===
- Jamaica
- British Windward Islands
- British Honduras
- British West Indies
- British Guiana
- British Leeward Islands

=== Mediterranean and Africa ===
- Malta
- Gibraltar
- Ionian Islands
- Sierra Leone and the West African Forts, Consulates to the Barbary States
- Cape Colony (South Africa)

=== Australian colonies ===
- South Australia
- New South Wales
- Swan River Colony (Western Australia)
- Van Diemen's Land (Tasmania)

=== Eastern colonies ===
- Ceylon
- Mauritius

== Second Colonial Office (1854–1966) ==
In 1854, the War and Colonial Office was divided in two, the War Office and a new Colonial Office, created to deal specifically with affairs in the colonies and assigned to the Secretary of State for the Colonies. The Colonial Office did not have responsibility for all British possessions overseas: for example, both the British Raj and other British territories near India, were under the authority of the India Office from 1858. Other, more informal protectorates, such as the Khedivate of Egypt, fell under the authority of the Foreign Office.

After 1878, when the Emigration Commission was abolished, an Emigration Department was created in the Colonial Office. This was merged with the General Department in 1894, before its complete abolition in 1896.

The increasing independence of the Dominions—Australia, Canada, New Zealand, Newfoundland and South Africa—following the 1907 Imperial Conference, led to the formation of a separate Dominion Division within the Colonial Office. From 1925 onwards the UK ministry included a separate Secretary of State for Dominion Affairs.

After the Cairo Conference held in March 1921, the Colonial Office was charged for the Palestine Mandate administration in substitution of the Foreign Office.

On 16 April 1947, the Irgun placed a bomb at the Colonial Office which failed to detonate. The plot was linked to the 1946 Embassy bombing.

After the Dominion of India and Dominion of Pakistan gained independence in 1947, the Dominion Office was merged with the India Office to form the Commonwealth Relations Office.

In 1966, the Commonwealth Relations Office was re-merged with the Colonial Office, forming the Commonwealth Office. Two years later, this department was itself merged into the Foreign Office, establishing the Foreign and Commonwealth Office.

The Colonial Office had its offices in the Foreign and Commonwealth Office Main Building in Whitehall.

== The Colonial Office List ==
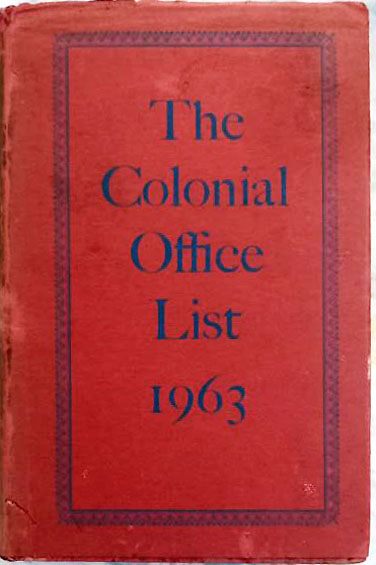

From 1862, the Colonial Office published historical and statistical information concerning the United Kingdom's colonial dependencies in The Colonial Office List, though between 1926 and 1940 it was known as The Dominions Office and Colonial Office List. It later became known as the Commonwealth Relations Office Year Book and Commonwealth Office Year Book. In addition to the official List published by the Colonial Office, an edited version was also produced by Waterlow and Sons. It can be difficult to distinguish between the two versions in library catalogue descriptions. For example, The Sydney Stock and Station Journal of 3 December 1915 commented:

This used to be the "Colonial Office Journal," but it looked – or sounded – too official, so they changed it to "The Colonial Journal." But it is still edited by Sir W. H. Mercer, K.C.M.G., one of the Crown Agents for the Colonies, but it is printed by Waterlow and Sons, London Wall. It comes as near to being an "Official publication" as possible, but we'll assume that it isn't.

== Timeline ==
History of English and British government departments with responsibility for foreign affairs and those with responsibility for the colonies, dominions and the Commonwealth
Northern Department; 1660–1782; Secretaries — Undersecretaries	Southern Department; 1660–1768; Secretaries — Undersecretaries		—
Northern Department; 1660–1782; Secretaries — Undersecretaries	Southern Department; 1768–1782; Secretaries — Undersecretaries; 1782: diplomatic responsibilities transferred to new Foreign Office	Colonial Office; 1768–1782; Secretaries — Undersecretaries	—
Foreign Office; 1782–1968; Secretaries — Ministers — Undersecretaries	Home Office; 1782–1794; Secretaries — Undersecretaries		—
Foreign Office; 1782–1968; Secretaries — Ministers — Undersecretaries	War Office; 1794–1801; Secretaries — Undersecretaries		—
Foreign Office; 1782–1968; Secretaries — Ministers — Undersecretaries	War and Colonial Office; 1801–1854; Secretaries — Undersecretaries		—
Foreign Office; 1782–1968; Secretaries — Ministers — Undersecretaries	Colonial Office; 1854–1925; Secretaries — Undersecretaries		India Office; 1858–1937; Secretaries — Undersecretaries
Foreign Office; 1782–1968; Secretaries — Ministers — Undersecretaries	Colonial Office; 1925–1966; Secretaries — Ministers — Undersecretaries	Dominions Office; 1925–1947; Secretaries — Undersecretaries	India Office; 1858–1937; Secretaries — Undersecretaries
Foreign Office; 1782–1968; Secretaries — Ministers — Undersecretaries	Colonial Office; 1925–1966; Secretaries — Ministers — Undersecretaries	Dominions Office; 1925–1947; Secretaries — Undersecretaries	India Office and Burma Office; 1937–1947; Secretaries — Undersecretaries
Foreign Office; 1782–1968; Secretaries — Ministers — Undersecretaries	Colonial Office; 1925–1966; Secretaries — Ministers — Undersecretaries	Commonwealth Relations Office; 1947–1966; Secretaries — Ministers — Undersecretaries	
Foreign Office; 1782–1968; Secretaries — Ministers — Undersecretaries	Commonwealth Office; 1966–1968; Secretaries — Ministers — Undersecretaries		
Foreign and Commonwealth Office; 1968–2020; Secretaries — Ministers — Undersecretaries
Foreign, Commonwealth and Development Office; Since 2020; Secretaries — Ministers — Undersecretaries

== See also ==
- Colonial Land and Emigration Commission
- Colonial Service
- List of British Empire-related topics
