= Southern Department (Great Britain) =

Former British government department (1660–1782)

Department overview
- Formed: 1660
- Dissolved: 1782
- Superseding Department: Home Office; Foreign Office
- Jurisdiction: Kingdom of England, Kingdom of Great Britain
- Minister responsible: Secretary of State for the Southern Department

The Southern Department was a department of the government of the Kingdom of England and later the Kingdom of Great Britain from 1660 until 1782 when its functions (and the functions of the Northern Department) were reorganised into the new Home Office and Foreign Office. The department was tasked with home affairs, foreign affairs in parts of Southern Europe, and with governing the English and later British colonies, among other matters.

== History ==
The department was initially established in 1660. It had a variety of responsibilities, including Irish policy, the Channel Islands, and foreign affairs concerning southern European powers such as France, Spain, Portugal, Switzerland, Italian states and the Ottoman Empire. Colonial policy was also the responsibility of the Southern Department until 1768, at which time it was assigned to the newly created Secretary of State for the Colonies. Domestic affairs in England and Wales were shared indifferently between the Southern and Northern Departments. Scotland, which joined with England into the Kingdom of Great Britain after 1707, was at times represented by a separate Secretary of State for Scotland, though at others (1725–1741 and 1746–1782) it too was represented by the Northern and Southern Departments.

It was administered by the Secretary of State for the Southern Department. The Southern Department's opposite number within government was the Northern Department, responsible for government dealings in northern Europe. In 1782, the Northern and Southern Departments were reorganised, with the Foreign Office taking over their foreign affairs responsibilities and Home Office taking over their domestic, military affairs, and colonial responsibilities. (Military and colonial affairs were later transferred to a new offices).

History of English and British government departments with responsibility for foreign affairs and those with responsibility for the colonies, dominions and the Commonwealth
Northern Department; 1660–1782; Secretaries — Undersecretaries	Southern Department; 1660–1768; Secretaries — Undersecretaries		—
Northern Department; 1660–1782; Secretaries — Undersecretaries	Southern Department; 1768–1782; Secretaries — Undersecretaries; 1782: diplomatic responsibilities transferred to new Foreign Office	Colonial Office; 1768–1782; Secretaries — Undersecretaries	—
Foreign Office; 1782–1968; Secretaries — Ministers — Undersecretaries	Home Office; 1782–1794; Secretaries — Undersecretaries		—
Foreign Office; 1782–1968; Secretaries — Ministers — Undersecretaries	War Office; 1794–1801; Secretaries — Undersecretaries		—
Foreign Office; 1782–1968; Secretaries — Ministers — Undersecretaries	War and Colonial Office; 1801–1854; Secretaries — Undersecretaries		—
Foreign Office; 1782–1968; Secretaries — Ministers — Undersecretaries	Colonial Office; 1854–1925; Secretaries — Undersecretaries		India Office; 1858–1937; Secretaries — Undersecretaries
Foreign Office; 1782–1968; Secretaries — Ministers — Undersecretaries	Colonial Office; 1925–1966; Secretaries — Ministers — Undersecretaries	Dominions Office; 1925–1947; Secretaries — Undersecretaries	India Office; 1858–1937; Secretaries — Undersecretaries
Foreign Office; 1782–1968; Secretaries — Ministers — Undersecretaries	Colonial Office; 1925–1966; Secretaries — Ministers — Undersecretaries	Dominions Office; 1925–1947; Secretaries — Undersecretaries	India Office and Burma Office; 1937–1947; Secretaries — Undersecretaries
Foreign Office; 1782–1968; Secretaries — Ministers — Undersecretaries	Colonial Office; 1925–1966; Secretaries — Ministers — Undersecretaries	Commonwealth Relations Office; 1947–1966; Secretaries — Ministers — Undersecretaries	
Foreign Office; 1782–1968; Secretaries — Ministers — Undersecretaries	Commonwealth Office; 1966–1968; Secretaries — Ministers — Undersecretaries		
Foreign and Commonwealth Office; 1968–2020; Secretaries — Ministers — Undersecretaries
Foreign, Commonwealth and Development Office; Since 2020; Secretaries — Ministers — Undersecretaries

== See also ==
- Northern Department
- Secretaries of state for the Southern Department
- Secretaries of state for the Northern Department
- Secretary of State (England)

== Bibliography ==
- Thomson, Mark A. (1932). The Secretaries of State: 1681-1782. London: Frank Cass.
