= Southern Department =

There are a number of government agencies and administrative divisions with the title of Southern Department.

- Southern Department (United Kingdom)
- Southern Department (United States), see Departments of the Continental Army, or Department (United States Army)
- Southern Department of British North America (1755–1783), see Indian Department#Indian Department for British North America 1755–1867

== See also ==
- Sud (department), Haiti
