= Secretary of State for India =

Former position in British government

- Royal Arms as used by His Majesty's Government
- India Office
- Member of: British Cabinet; Privy Council
- Seat: Westminster, London
- Appointer: The British Monarch (on advice of the Prime Minister)
- Term length: At His Majesty's pleasure
- Constituting instrument: Government of India Act
- Precursor: President of the Board of Control
- Formation: 2 August 1858
- First holder: Lord Stanley
- Final holder: William Hare, 5th Earl of Listowel
- Abolished: 14 August 1947
- Deputy: Under-Secretary of State for India

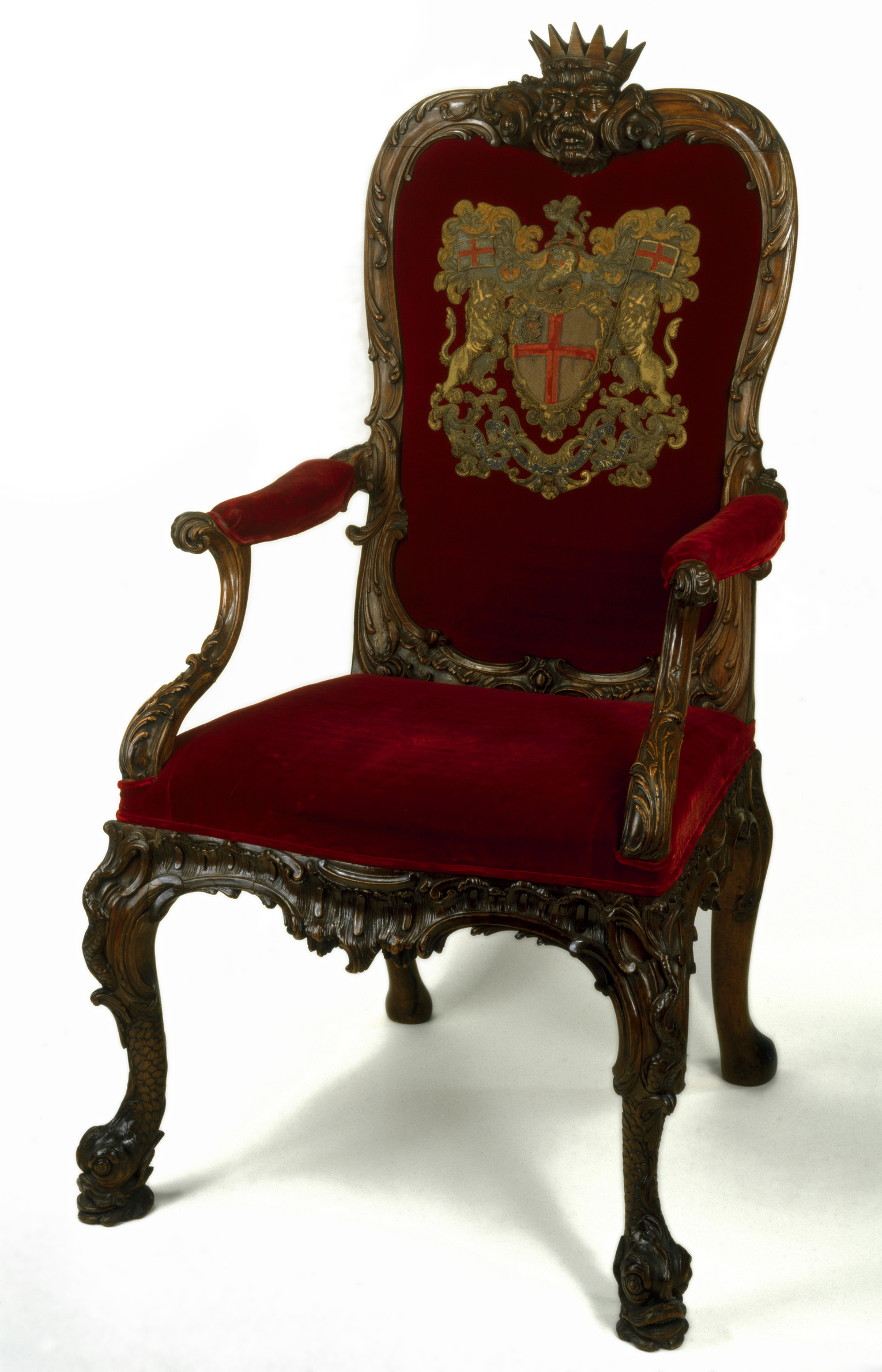
The ceremonial seat of the Chairman of the Court of Directors of the East India Company, and subsequently that of the Secretary of State for India

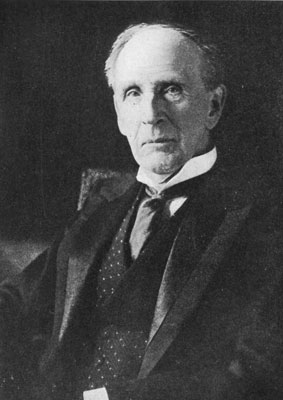
The 1st Viscount Morley of Blackburn, Secretary of State for India from 1905 to 1910 and again briefly, as acting Secretary, in 1911

His (or Her) Majesty's Principal Secretary of State for India, known for short as the India secretary or the Indian secretary, was the secretary of state with responsibility for the India Office in Whitehall that oversaw relations and administration of the Indian subcontinent under the British Raj. The post was created in 1858 when the East India Company's rule in Bengal ended and India, except for the Princely States, was brought officially under the British Crown from London and the officeholder was a member of the British Cabinet.

In 1937, the India Office was reorganised which separated Burma and Aden under a new Burma Office, but the same secretary of state headed both departments and a new title was established as His Majesty's Principal Secretary of State for India and Burma. The India Office and its secretary of state were abolished in August 1947, when the United Kingdom granted independence in the Indian Independence Act, which created two new independent dominions, India and Pakistan. Burma soon achieved independence separately in early 1948.

== Secretaries of state for India, 1858–1937 ==
Portrait	Name	Term of office		Political party	Prime Minister
	Edward Stanley, Lord Stanley; MP for King's Lynn	2 August 1858	11 June 1859	Conservative	Edward Smith-Stanley, 14th Earl of Derby
	Sir Charles Wood; MP for Halifax until 1865; MP for Ripon after 1865	18 June 1859	16 February 1866	Liberal	Henry John Temple, 3rd Viscount Palmerston
	Sir Charles Wood; MP for Halifax until 1865; MP for Ripon after 1865	18 June 1859	16 February 1866	Liberal	John Russell, 1st Earl Russell
	George Robinson, 3rd Earl de Grey	16 February 1866	26 June 1866	Liberal	John Russell, 1st Earl Russell
	Robert Gascoyne-Cecil, Viscount Cranborne; MP for Stamford	6 July 1866	8 March 1867	Conservative	Edward Smith-Stanley, 14th Earl of Derby
	Sir Stafford Northcote; MP for North Devonshire	8 March 1867	1 December 1868	Conservative	Edward Smith-Stanley, 14th Earl of Derby
	Sir Stafford Northcote; MP for North Devonshire	8 March 1867	1 December 1868	Conservative	Benjamin Disraeli
	George Campbell, 8th Duke of Argyll	9 December 1868	17 February 1874	Liberal	William Ewart Gladstone
	Robert Gascoyne-Cecil, 3rd Marquess of Salisbury	21 February 1874	2 April 1878	Conservative	Benjamin Disraeli
	Gathorne Gathorne-Hardy, 1st Viscount Cranbrook	2 April 1878	21 April 1880	Conservative	Benjamin Disraeli
	Spencer Cavendish, Marquess of Hartington; MP for North East Lancashire	28 April 1880	16 December 1882	Liberal	William Ewart Gladstone
	John Wodehouse, 1st Earl of Kimberley	16 December 1882	9 June 1885	Liberal	William Ewart Gladstone
	Lord Randolph Churchill; MP for Paddington South	24 June 1885	28 January 1886	Conservative	Robert Gascoyne-Cecil, 3rd Marquess of Salisbury
	John Wodehouse, 1st Earl of Kimberley	6 February 1886	20 July 1886	Liberal	William Ewart Gladstone
	R. A. Cross, 1st Viscount Cross	3 August 1886	11 August 1892	Conservative	Robert Gascoyne-Cecil, 3rd Marquess of Salisbury
	John Wodehouse, 1st Earl of Kimberley	18 August 1892	10 March 1894	Liberal	William Ewart Gladstone
	Henry Fowler; MP for Wolverhampton East	10 March 1894	21 June 1895	Liberal	Archibald Primrose, 5th Earl of Rosebery
	Lord George Hamilton; MP for Ealing	4 July 1895	9 October 1903	Conservative	Robert Gascoyne-Cecil, 3rd Marquess of Salisbury (Unionist Coalition)
	Lord George Hamilton; MP for Ealing	4 July 1895	9 October 1903	Conservative	Arthur Balfour (Unionist Coalition)
	William St John Brodrick; MP for Guildford	9 October 1903	4 December 1905	Irish Unionist	Arthur Balfour (Unionist Coalition)
	John Morley; MP for Montrose Burghs until 1908; Viscount Morley of Blackburn after 1908	10 December 1905	3 November 1910	Liberal	Sir Henry Campbell-Bannerman
	John Morley; MP for Montrose Burghs until 1908; Viscount Morley of Blackburn after 1908	10 December 1905	3 November 1910	Liberal	H. H. Asquith
	Robert Crewe-Milnes, 1st Earl of Crewe	3 November 1910	7 March 1911	Liberal	H. H. Asquith
	John Morley, 1st Viscount Morley of Blackburn	7 March 1911	25 May 1911	Liberal	H. H. Asquith
	Robert Crewe-Milnes, 1st Marquess of Crewe	25 May 1911	25 May 1915	Liberal	H. H. Asquith
	Austen Chamberlain; MP for Birmingham West	25 May 1915	17 July 1917	Conservative	H. H. Asquith (Coalition) David Lloyd George (Coalition)
	Edwin Montagu; MP for Chesterton until 1918; MP for Cambridgeshire after 1918	17 July 1917	19 March 1922	Liberal	H. H. Asquith (Coalition) David Lloyd George (Coalition)
	William Peel, 2nd Viscount Peel	19 March 1922	22 January 1924	Conservative	Bonar Law
	William Peel, 2nd Viscount Peel	19 March 1922	22 January 1924	Conservative	Stanley Baldwin
	Sydney Olivier, 1st Baron Olivier	22 January 1924	3 November 1924	Labour	Ramsay MacDonald
	F. E. Smith, 1st Earl of Birkenhead	6 November 1924	18 October 1928	Conservative	Stanley Baldwin
	William Peel, 2nd Viscount Peel	18 October 1928	4 June 1929	Conservative	Stanley Baldwin
	William Wedgwood Benn; MP for Aberdeen North	7 June 1929	24 August 1931	Labour	Ramsay MacDonald
	Sir Samuel Hoare; MP for Chelsea	25 August 1931	7 June 1935	Conservative	Ramsay MacDonald (1st & 2nd National Min.)
	Lawrence Dundas, 2nd Marquess of Zetland	7 June 1935	28 May 1937	Conservative	Stanley Baldwin (3rd National Min.)

== Secretaries of state for India and Burma, 1937–1947 ==
Portrait	Name	Term of office		Political party	Prime Minister
	Lawrence Dundas, 2nd Marquess of Zetland	28 May 1937	13 May 1940	Conservative	Neville Chamberlain (4th National Min.; War Coalition)
	Leo Amery; MP for Birmingham Sparkbrook	13 May 1940	26 July 1945	Conservative	Winston Churchill (War Coalition; Caretaker Min.)
	Frederick Pethick-Lawrence, 1st Baron Pethick-Lawrence	3 August 1945	17 April 1947	Labour	Clement Attlee
	The Right Honourable; William Hare, 5th Earl of Listowel	17 April 1947	14 August 1947	Labour	Clement Attlee

== Secretaries of state for Burma, 1947–1948 ==
Portrait	Name	Term of office		Political party	Prime Minister
	The Right Honourable; William Hare, 5th Earl of Listowel	14 August 1947	4 January 1948	Labour	Clement Attlee

== See also ==
- India Office
- British Raj
- British rule in Burma
- Governor-General of India
- Imperial Civil Service
- Government of India Act

History of English and British government departments with responsibility for foreign affairs and those with responsibility for the colonies, dominions and the Commonwealth
Northern Department; 1660–1782; Secretaries — Undersecretaries	Southern Department; 1660–1768; Secretaries — Undersecretaries		—
Northern Department; 1660–1782; Secretaries — Undersecretaries	Southern Department; 1768–1782; Secretaries — Undersecretaries; 1782: diplomatic responsibilities transferred to new Foreign Office	Colonial Office; 1768–1782; Secretaries — Undersecretaries	—
Foreign Office; 1782–1968; Secretaries — Ministers — Undersecretaries	Home Office; 1782–1794; Secretaries — Undersecretaries		—
Foreign Office; 1782–1968; Secretaries — Ministers — Undersecretaries	War Office; 1794–1801; Secretaries — Undersecretaries		—
Foreign Office; 1782–1968; Secretaries — Ministers — Undersecretaries	War and Colonial Office; 1801–1854; Secretaries — Undersecretaries		—
Foreign Office; 1782–1968; Secretaries — Ministers — Undersecretaries	Colonial Office; 1854–1925; Secretaries — Undersecretaries		India Office; 1858–1937; Secretaries — Undersecretaries
Foreign Office; 1782–1968; Secretaries — Ministers — Undersecretaries	Colonial Office; 1925–1966; Secretaries — Ministers — Undersecretaries	Dominions Office; 1925–1947; Secretaries — Undersecretaries	India Office; 1858–1937; Secretaries — Undersecretaries
Foreign Office; 1782–1968; Secretaries — Ministers — Undersecretaries	Colonial Office; 1925–1966; Secretaries — Ministers — Undersecretaries	Dominions Office; 1925–1947; Secretaries — Undersecretaries	India Office and Burma Office; 1937–1947; Secretaries — Undersecretaries
Foreign Office; 1782–1968; Secretaries — Ministers — Undersecretaries	Colonial Office; 1925–1966; Secretaries — Ministers — Undersecretaries	Commonwealth Relations Office; 1947–1966; Secretaries — Ministers — Undersecretaries	
Foreign Office; 1782–1968; Secretaries — Ministers — Undersecretaries	Commonwealth Office; 1966–1968; Secretaries — Ministers — Undersecretaries		
Foreign and Commonwealth Office; 1968–2020; Secretaries — Ministers — Undersecretaries
Foreign, Commonwealth and Development Office; Since 2020; Secretaries — Ministers — Undersecretaries
