= Frederick Bovenschen =

British civil servant

Bovenschen in 1948.

Sir Frederick Carl Bovenschen, KCB, KBE (26 March 1884 – 9 November 1977) was a British civil servant. He was (with Sir Eric Speed) Joint Permanent Under-Secretary of State for War from 1942 to 1945.

He was appointed a Companion of the Order of the Bath (CB) in the 1927 Birthday Honours, appointed a Knight Commander of the Order of the British Empire (KBE) in the 1928 Birthday Honours, and promoted to Knight Commander of the Order of the Bath (KCB) in the 1943 Birthday Honours.
