= Eric Speed =

British civil servant

Sir Eric Bourne Bentinck Speed, KCB, KBE, MC (26 January 1895 – 28 June 1971) was a British civil servant. He was Permanent Under-Secretary of State for War, jointly with Sir Frederick Bovenschen from 1942 to 1945, and then until 1948.
