= Under-Secretary of State for War =

Defunct British government position

Under-Secretary of State for War was a British government position, first applied to Evan Nepean (appointed in 1794). In 1801 the offices for War and the Colonies were merged and the post became that of Under-Secretary of State for War and the Colonies. The position was re-instated in 1854 and remained until 1947, when it was combined with that of Financial Secretary to the War Office. In 1964 the War Office, Admiralty and Air Ministry were merged to form the Ministry of Defence, and the post was abolished.

== Parliamentary under-secretaries of state for war ==
=== 1794–1801 ===
| Name | Period |
|---|---|
| Evan Nepean | 1794–1795 |
| William Huskisson | 1795–1801 |

See Under-Secretary of State for War and the Colonies for the period 1801-1854.

=== 1854–1947 ===
| Name | Period |
|---|---|
| Henry Roberts | 1854–1855 |
| Frederick Peel | 1855–1857 |
| Sir John Ramsden, 5th Baronet | 1857–1858 |
| Charles Hardinge, 2nd Viscount Hardinge | 1858–March 1859 |
| James St Clair-Erskine, 3rd Earl of Rosslyn | March 1859–June 1859 |
| George Robinson, 3rd Earl de Grey | June 1859–January 1861 |
| Thomas Baring | January 1861–July 1861 |
| George Robinson, 3rd Earl de Grey | July 1861–1863 |
| Spencer Cavendish, Marquess of Hartington | 1863–February 1866 |
| Frederick Hamilton-Temple-Blackwood, 5th Baron Dufferin and Claneboye | February 1866–July 1866 |
| William Lygon Pakenham, 4th Earl of Longford | July 1866–1868 |
| Thomas Baring, 2nd Baron Northbrook | 1868–1872 |
| Henry Petty-FitzMaurice, 5th Marquess of Lansdowne | 1872–1874 |
| George Herbert, 13th Earl of Pembroke | 1874–1875 |
| George Cadogan, 5th Earl Cadogan | 1875–1878 |
| William Keppel, Viscount Bury | 1878–1880 |
| Albert Parker, 3rd Earl of Morley | 1880–1885 |
| William Keppel, Viscount Bury | 1885–February 1886 |
| William Mansfield, 2nd Baron Sandhurst | February 1886–August 1886 |
| Robert Harris, 4th Baron Harris | August 1886–1890 |
| Adelbert Cust, 3rd Earl Brownlow | 1890–1892 |
| William Mansfield, 2nd Baron Sandhurst | 1892–January 1895 |
| Robert Collier, 2nd Baron Monkswell | January 1895–July 1895 |
| St John Brodrick | July 1895–1898 |
| George Wyndham | 1898–1900 |
| George Somerset, 3rd Baron Raglan | 1900–1902 |
| Albert Yorke, 6th Earl of Hardwicke | 1902–1903 |
| Richard Hely-Hutchinson, 6th Earl of Donoughmore | 1903–1905 |
| Newton Wallop, 6th Earl of Portsmouth | 1905–1908 |
| Auberon Herbert, 9th Baron Lucas of Crudwell | 1908–1911 |
| J. E. B. Seely | 1911–1912 |
| Harold Tennant | 1912–1916 |
| Edward Stanley, 17th Earl of Derby | 1916 |
| Ian Macpherson | 1916–1918 |
| William Peel, 2nd Viscount Peel | 1919–1921 |
| Robert Sanders | 1921–1922 |
| Walter Guinness | 1922–1923 |
| Wilfrid Ashley | 1923–1924 |
| Clement Attlee | 1924 |
| Richard Onslow, 5th Earl of Onslow | 1924–1928 |
| George Sutherland-Leveson-Gower, 5th Duke of Sutherland | 1928–1929 |
| Herbrand Sackville, 9th Earl De La Warr | 1929–1930 |
| Dudley Aman, 1st Baron Marley | 1930–1931 |
| Office vacant | 1931 |
| James Stanhope, 7th Earl Stanhope | 1931–1934 |
| Donald Howard, 3rd Baron Strathcona and Mount Royal | 1934–1939 |
| Geoffrey FitzClarence, 5th Earl of Munster | 1939 |
| John Lyttelton, 9th Viscount Cobham | 1939–1940 |
| Henry Page Croft, 1st Baron Croft and Sir Edward Grigg | 1940–1942 |
| Henry Page Croft, 1st Baron Croft and Arthur Henderson | 1942–1943 |
| Henry Page Croft, 1st Baron Croft | 1943–1945 |
| Harry Nathan, 1st Baron Nathan | 1945–1946 |
| Frank Pakenham, Baron Pakenham | 1946–April 1947 |

In April 1947 the office was combined with that of Financial Secretary to the War Office.

=== Financial secretaries to the War Office, 1947–1964 ===
| Name | Period |
|---|---|
| John Freeman | 1947–? |
| Michael Stewart | ?–1951 |
| Woodrow Wyatt | 1951 |
| James Hutchison | 1951–1954 |
| Fitzroy Maclean | 1954–1957 |
| Julian Amery | 1957–1958 |
| Hugh Fraser | 1958–1960 |
| James Ramsden | 1960–1963 |
| Peter Kirk | 1963–April 1964 |

Office reorganised 1 April 1964

== Permanent under-secretaries of state for war, 1854–1966 ==
| Name | Period |
|---|---|
| G. C. Mundy | 1854–1857 |
| Sir Benjamin Hawes | 1857–1862 |
| Sir Edward Lugard | 1862–1871 |
| John Vivian. | 1871–1878 |
| Sir Ralph Wood Thompson | 1878–1895 |
| Sir Arthur Haliburton | 1895–1897 |
| Sir Ralph Henry Knox | 1897–1901 |
| Sir Edward Ward | 1901–1914 |
| Sir Reginald Brade | 1914–1920 |
| Sir Herbert Creedy | 1920–1939 |
| Sir P. J. Grigg | 1939–1942 |
| Sir Frederick Bovenschen and Sir Eric Speed | 1942–1945 |
| Sir E. Speed | 1945–1948 |
| Sir G. Turner | 1949–1956 |
| Sir Edward Playfair | 1956–1960 |
| Sir Richard Way | 1960–1963 |
| A. Drew | 1963–1964 |
