= Burma Office =

Historical British government department

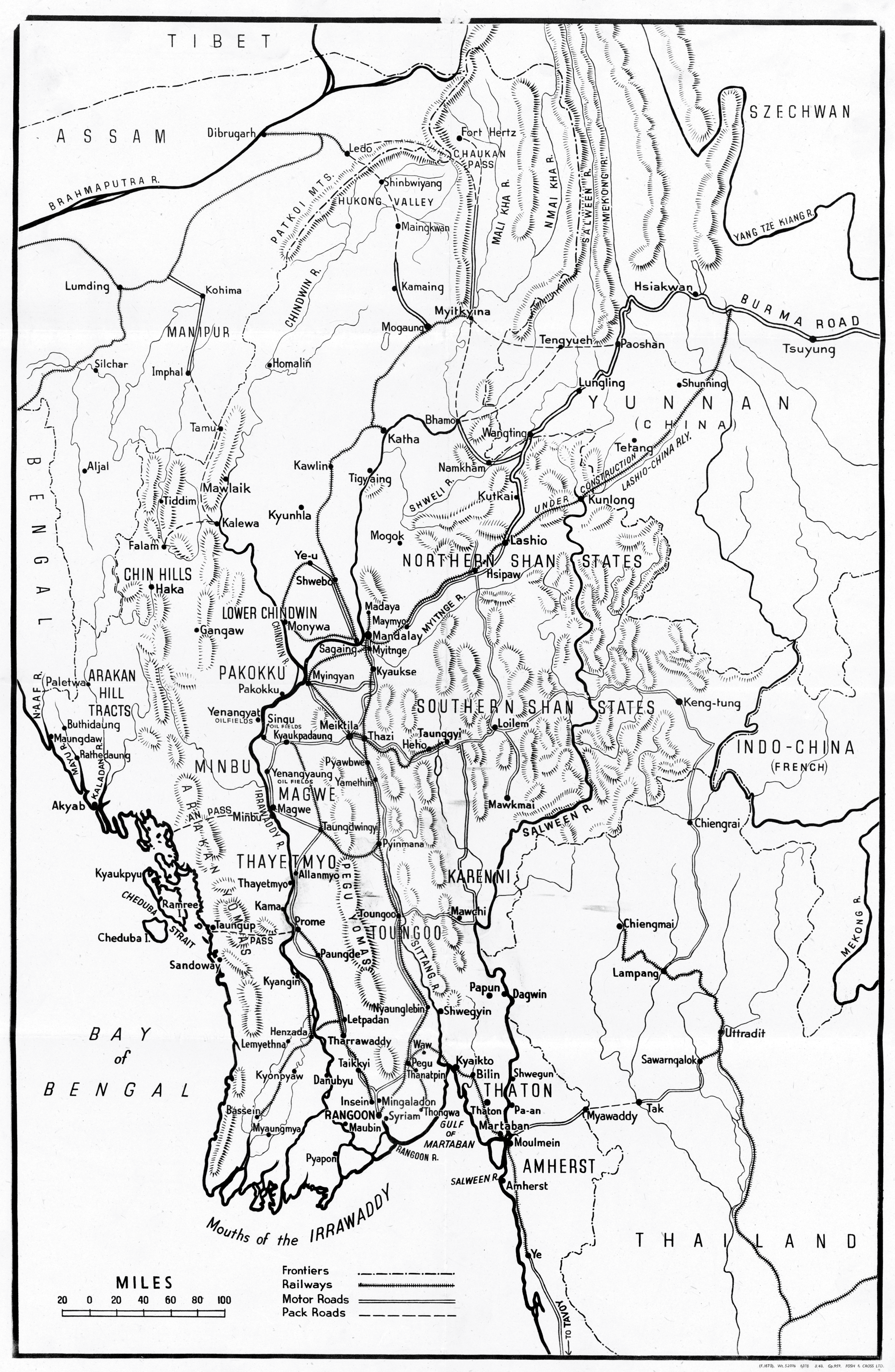
Map of Burma (1941)

The Burma Office was a British government department created in 1937 to oversee the administration of Burma. The department was headed until 1947 by the Secretary of State for India and Burma, a member of the British cabinet, and then for a few months until January 1948 by the Secretary of State for Burma.

== Creation and end of the Burma Office ==
With the administrative reforms of the Government of India Acts of 1919 and 1935, a tentative devolution of authority to legislative bodies and local governments in South Asia was begun. In 1937, as provided for in the 1935 act, these reforms led to the separation of Burma from India and the creation in London of the Burma Office, constitutionally separate from the India Office, although the two shared the same Secretary of State and were housed in the same building. The new Burma Office came into existence on 1 April 1937.

In August 1947, two newly independent dominions of India and Pakistan resulted from the partition of British India. In September 1947, a constitution to create the Union of Burma, an independent republic outside the Commonwealth, was approved, and in October the Nu-Attlee agreement was signed, granting Burma independence. Thus the Burma Office was dissolved and the last Secretary of State for Burma, William Hare, 5th Earl of Listowel, left the British Cabinet. In the words of the Commonwealth Office Year Book,

On 4th January 1948 Burma ceased to be part of His Majesty's dominions and became a foreign country. The Burma Office ceased to exist on 3rd January 1948 and the staff were transferred to the Commonwealth Relations Office.

== Timeline ==
- 1937: Separation of Burma from British India, establishment of the Burma Office
- 1947: Announcements of imminent independence of India, Pakistan and Burma
- 15 August 1947: Partition of India into independent India and Pakistan, end of India Office
- 4 January 1948: Independence of Burma and abolition of Burma Office

== Burma Office records ==
Unlike other British Government records, the Burma Office records, like those of the India Office, are not in The National Archives at Kew but are deposited with the India Office Records in the British Library, London, where they form part of the Asia, Pacific and Africa Collections. The catalogue is searchable online in the catalogues.

== See also ==
- Secretary of State for India
- India Office
