= 1935 Birthday Honours =

British government recognitions

The 1935 Birthday Honours for the British Empire were announced on 3 June 1935 to celebrate the Birthday and Silver Jubilee of King George V.

The recipients of honours are displayed here as they were styled before their new honour, and arranged by honour, with classes (Knight Grand Cross, etc.) and then divisions (Military, Civil, etc.) as appropriate.

== United Kingdom ==
=== Viscounts ===
- The Right Honourable Charles, Baron Bledisloe, G.C.M.G., K.B.E. Lately Governor-General of New Zealand.

=== Barons ===
- Sir Arthur Balfour, Bt., K.B.E., LL.D., J.P. For public services.
- Edward Charles Grenfell, Esq., M.P., Member of Parliament for the City of London since 1922. For political and public services.
- Sir William James Peake Mason, Bt., J.P. For political and public services in the County of Somerset.
- Sir George Ernest May, Bt., K.B.E., Chairman, Import Duties Advisory Committee.
- The Right Honourable Sir Frederick Edward Grey Ponsonby, G.C.B., G.C.V.O., Treasurer to His Majesty The King and Keeper of the Privy Purse.
- Colonel the Right Honourable Sir Clive Wigram, G.C.B., G.C.V.O., C.S.I., Private Secretary to His Majesty The King.

=== Privy Councillors ===
- Clement Richard Attlee, Esq., M.P., Member of Parliament for the Limehouse Division since 1922. Deputy leader of the Labour Party in the House of Commons.
- Leslie Hore-Belisha, Esq., M.P., Member of Parliament for Devonport since 1923. Minister of Transport since 1934.
- Captain Robert Croft Bourne, M.P., Member of Parliament for Oxford since 1924. Deputy Chairman of the House of Commons since 1931.

=== Baronets ===
- Sir (Robert) Burton Chadwick, Member of Parliament for Barrow-in-Furness, 1918–22, and for Wallasey, 1922–31. Parliamentary Secretary to the Board of Trade, 1924–28. Founder and first Deputy Master of the Honourable Company of Master Mariners. For political and public services.
- Lieutenant-Colonel Cuthbert Morley Headlam, D.S.Q., O.B.E., T.D., J.P., D.L., M.P., Member of Parliament for Barnard Castle, 1924–29, and since 1931. Parliamentary and Financial Secretary to the Admiralty, 1926–29. Parliamentary Secretary to the Ministry of Pensions, 1931–32, and to the Ministry of Transport, 1932–34. For political and public services.
- Sir Henry Jackson, M.A., M.B., M.P. For services in connection with transport questions.
- Councillor Sir Crawford McCullagh, J.P., D.L., Lord Mayor of Belfast.
- William Mallinson, Esq., J.P. For political and public services, especially in Walthamstow.
- Walter Russell Rea, Esq., M.P., Member of Parliament for Dewsbury. Chief Whip of the Opposition Liberal Party.
- Sir (Hugh) Arthur Rose, D.S.O., LL.D., J.P., D.L. For public services.
- John Ralph Starkey, Esq., J.P., D.L., President of the Newark Conservative Association, Member of Parliament for the Newark Division, 1906–22. For political and public services in Nottinghamshire.

=== Knights Bachelor ===
- Noel Ashbridge, Esq., Chief Engineer of the British Broadcasting Corporation.
- Professor Joseph Barcroft, O.B.E., M.A., F.R.S., Professor of Physiology, Cambridge University.
- Alderman William Gurney Benham, J.P. For political and public services in Essex.
- William John Board, Esq., O.B.E., Town Clerk of Nottingham. President of the Society of Town Clerks. On the occasion of the centenary of local government.
- Laurence George Brock, Esq., C.B., Chairman of the Board of Control.
- William Richard Codling, Esq., C.B., C.V.O., C.B.E., Controller, H.M. Stationery Office.
- Francis Nicholas Cowlin, Esq. For public services in Bristol.
- Charles Edwards, Esq., C.B.E., J.P., M.P., Member of Parliament for the Bedwellty Division. Chief Whip of the Labour Party.
- Lieutenant-Colonel Anthony Gadie, T.D., J.P., Member of Parliament for Bradford Central, 1924–29. For political and public services in Bradford.
- John Howarth Grey, Esq., J.P. For distinguished service to the Cotton industry.
- Professor Arthur John Hall, M.A., M.D., D.Sc., F.E.C.P., Emeritus Professor of Medicine, University of Sheffield. For distinguished service to medicine and medical science, with special reference to problems of the health of industrial workers.
- Cecil Hanbury, Esq., M.P., Member of Parliament for North Dorset since 1924. For political and public services.
- Harold Cecil Aubrey Harmsworth, Esq. For political and public services in the West of England.
- Seymour Hicks, Esq., Actor-Manager.
- Alderman William Hodgson, J.P., Vice-Chairman, Lancashire County Council. For public services in Lancashire.
- Henry Nicholas Holmes, Esq., J.P. For political and public services in Norwich.
- John Hepburn Milne Home, Esq., Vice-Chairman, Advisory Council to Department of Agriculture for Scotland. For services to agriculture.
- Herbert Henry Humphries, Esq., C.B.E., M.Inst.C.E., City Engineer of Birmingham, President of the Town Planning Institute. On the occasion of the centenary of local government.
- His Honour Judge Arthur Gwynne James, County Court Judge.
- Patrick Playfair Laidlaw, Esq., M.A., B.Ch., F.R.C.P., F.R.S., Pathologist to the Medical Research Council. For distinguished service to medical science.
- Lieutenant-Colonel Charles Glen MacAndrew, M.P., Member of Parliament for the Partick Division of Glasgow since 1931, and for the Kilmarnock Division of Ayr and Bute, 1924–29. For political and public services.
- Alfred Newton Macaulay, Esq., T.D., J.P. For public services, especially in Sutherland.
- Frederick James Marquis, Esq., J.P., Chairman of the Incorporated Association of Retail Distributors.
- George Middleton, Esq., J.P., First Church Estates Commissioner, and Chairman of Committees of Queen Anne's Bounty.
- George Arthur Mitchell, Esq., M.I.M.E., J.P. For services to Commerce and Industry.
- William Luscombe Munday, Esq. For political and public services in Plymouth.
- Clement Henry Newsum, Esq., J.P., D.L. For political and public services in Lincolnshire.
- Arthur Maule Oliver, Esq., O.B.E., Town Clerk of Newcastle. On the occasion of the centenary of local government.
- Standen Leonard Pearce, Esq., C.B.E., D.Sc., Engineer-in-Chief, London Power Company, Limited.
- Arthur Pugh, Esq., C.B.E., J.P., General Secretary of the Iron and Steel Trades Confederation and the British Iron, Steel and Kindred Trades Association.
- Bruce Lyttelton Richmond, Esq., Editor of the Times Literary Supplement.
- Colonel George Fossett Roberts, O.B.E., T.D., J.P. For political and public services in Cardiganshire.
- Alderman Arthur Douglas Robinson, For political and public services in the Borough of Wandsworth.
- Evan Williams, Esq., LL.D., D.L., President of the Mining Association of Great Britain. For public services.
- William Gardner Thomson, Esq., J.P. For political and public services in Linlithgowshire.
- Charles Leonard Woolley, Esq., M.A., D.Litt. For services to Archaeology.
- John Vigers Worthington, Esq., M.R.C.S., L.R.C.P., M.P., Member of Parliament for the Forest of Dean Division of Gloucestershire since 1931. Parliamentary Private Secretary to the Prime Minister.
- Percy Scott Worthington, Esq.. M.A., F.S.A., F.R.I.B.A. For services to Architecture.
- Charles Arthur Wrench, Esq., Honorary Secretary of the London Federation of Boys' Clubs.
- John Lavington Bonython, Esq. For public and philanthropic services in the State of South Australia.
- Thomas Buckland, Esq., Chairman of the Board of Directors of the Bank of New South Wales.
- The Honourable Joseph Amable Thomas Chapais, LL.D., F.R.S.C. For contributions to literature and culture in the Dominion of Canada.
- Francis Vernon Frazer, Esq., Deputy Chairman of Executive, Commission of Agriculture, Dominion of New Zealand.
- The Honourable Percival Donald Leslie Fynn, C.M.G., Minister without Portfolio, Southern Rhodesia.
- Edmund Wyly Grier, Esq., R.C.A., President, Royal Academy of Arts, Dominion of Canada.
- Henry Horton, Esq. For public services in the Dominion of New Zealand.
- The Honourable William Gilbert Stewart McArthur, lately Judge of the Supreme Court, State of Victoria.
- John Gilbert McLaren, Esq., C.M.G., Official Secretary, Office of the High Commissioner in London for the Commonwealth of Australia.
- Ernest Campbell MacMillan, Esq., Mus. Doc., F.R.C.M., F.R.C.O., Principal, Toronto Conservatory of Music, Dominion of Canada.
- Harry Cuthbertson Moxham, Esq., D.D.S., Federal President of the Dental Association, Commonwealth of Australia.
- Alderman Alfred Livingston Parker, Lord Mayor of Sydney, State of New South Wales.
- Charles George Douglas Roberts, Esq., M.A., LL.D., F.R.S.C., poet, author and historian. For contributions to literature in the Dominion of Canada.
- The Honourable Frederick Harold Stewart, Parliamentary Under-Secretary for Employment, Commonwealth of Australia.
- The Honourable Frederick Henry Tout, Member of the Legislative Council, State of New South Wales. For public services in the Commonwealth of Australia.
- Ernest Henry Wreford, Esq., Chief Manager, National Bank of Australasia Limited, Melbourne. For public services in the Commonwealth of Australia.
- Thomas Couper, Esq., C.S.I., Acting Governor of Burma.
- Kunwar Jagdish Prasad, C.S.I., C.I.E., O.B.E., Member of the Governor-General's Executive Council.
- Chaudhury Zafrullah Khan, Member of the Governor-General's Executive Council.
- John Tarlton Whitty, Esq., C.S.I, C.I.E., Indian Civil Service (retired), lately Vice-President of the Executive Council of the Governor of Bihar and Orissa.
- Mr. Justice James Addison, Indian Civil Service, Puisne Judge of the High Court of Judicature at Lahore, Punjab.
- Mr. Justice Leonard Wilfred James Costello, Barrister-at-Law, Puisne Judge of the High Court of Judicature at Fort William, Calcutta, Bengal.
- Mr. Justice Stephen James Murphy, Indian Civil Service, Puisne Judge of the High Court of Judicature at Bombay.
- Mr. Justice Carleton Moss King, C.I.E., Indian Civil Service, Chief Judge of the Chief Court of Oudh, United Provinces.
- Clement Preston Colvin, Esq., O.B.E., V.D., lately Member of the Railway Board, Government of India, at present Honorary Secretary of the King's Silver Jubilee Fund.
- James Braid Taylor, Esq., C.I.E., Indian Civil Service, lately Additional Secretary to the Government of India in the Finance Department, now Deputy Governor of the Reserve Bank of India.
- Ernest Miller, Esq., General Manager for India of the Burmah-Shell Oil Storage and Distributing Company of India, Limited, Bombay, and Member of the Council of State.
- John Charles Weir, Esq., K.C., Member of the Public Service Commission, Government of India.
- Bertram Maitland Crosthwaite, Esq., V.D., Agent, Burma Railways, Burma.
- Lewis Leigh Fermor, Esq., O.B.E., Director, Geological Survey of India.
- Abdul Halim Khan Ghuznavi, Esq., M.L.A., Landholder, Mymensingh, and Sheriff of Calcutta, Bengal.
- Alan Michael Green, Esq., C.I.E., Indian Civil Service, lately Deputy High Commissioner for India, London.
- William Edward Preston, Esq., lately Chief Manager, Chartered Bank of India, Australia and China, London.
- Saiyid Raza Ali, Esq., C.B.E., Agent to the Government of India in South Africa.
- M. R. Ry. Diwan Bahadur Mocherla Ramachandra Rao Pantulu Garu, President, Madras Co-operative Central Land Mortgage Bank, Ltd., Madras.
- Rao Bahadur Thakur Sadul Singh, C.I.E., of Bagseu, Colonel in the Bikaner Army, Tazimi Sardar and Vice-President of the State Executive Council and Public Works Minister, Bikaner State, Rajputana.
- Dr. Shafa'at Ahmad Khan, Professor of Modern Indian History at the University of Allahabad.
- Harold Bruce Gardiner Austin, Esq., O.B.E., Speaker of the House of Assembly, Barbados.
- Thomas Forrest Garvin, Esq., lately Senior Puisne Judge, Ceylon.
- Walter Burford Johnson, Esq., C.M.G., M.B., Director of Medical and Sanitary Services, Nigeria.
- Alasdair Duncan Atholl MacGregor, Esq., Chief Justice, Hong Kong.
- Alan Rae Smith, Esq., O.B.E., Member of the Colonial Development Advisory Committee.

=== Order of the Bath ===
==== Knight Grand Cross (GCB) ====
- Admiral Sir John Donald Kelly, G.C.V.O., K.C.B.
- Admiral Sir William Wordsworth Fisher, K.C.B., C.V.O.
- General Sir Cyril John Deverell, K.C.B., K.B.E., Colonel, The West Yorkshire Regiment (The Prince of Wales's Own), Aide-de-Camp General to The King, General Officer Commanding-in-Chief, Eastern Command.
- General the Honourable Sir John Francis Gathorne-Hardy, K.C.B., C.M.G., D.S.O., late Grenadier Guards, Aide-de-Camp General to The King, General Officer Commanding-in-Chief, Aldershot Command.
- General Sir Kenneth Wigram, K.C.B., C.S.I., C.B.E., D.S.O., Indian Army, Aide-de-Camp General to The King, General Officer Commanding-in-Chief, Northern Command, India.
- Air Chief Marshal Sir Edward Leonard Ellington, K.C.B., C.M.G., C.B.E., Royal Air Force.

==== Knight Commander (KCB) ====
- Admiral Hugh Francis Paget Sinclair, C.B. (Retired).
- Vice-Admiral George Knightley Chetwode, C.B., C.B.E.
- Vice-Admiral Charles Morton Forbes, C.B., D.S.O.
- Vice-Admiral Charles James Colebrooke Little, C.B.
- Lieutenant-General Richard Foster Carter Foster, C.B., C.M.G., D.S.O., Royal Marines.
- Lieutenant-General Charles Parker Deedes, C.B., C.M.G., D.S.O., Colonel, The King's Own Yorkshire Light Infantry, Military Secretary to the Secretary of State for War.
- Lieutenant-General Sir Ivo Lucius Beresford Vesey, K.B.E., C.B., C.M.G., D.S.O., halfpay, late The Queen's Royal Regiment (West Surrey), General Officer Commanding-in-Chief, Western Command, India, designate.
- Lieutenant-General James Andrew Hartigan, C.B., C.M.G., D.S.O., M.B., D.Ch., late Royal Army Medical Corps, Honorary Physician to The King, Director-General, Army Medical Services, The War Office
- Lieutenant-General Sir Hugh Jamieson Elles, K.C.M.G., K.C.V.O., C.B., D.S.O., late Royal Engineers, Colonel Commandant, Royal Tank Corps, Master-General of the Ordnance, The War Office.
- Lieutenant-General Sir Reginald Seaburne May, K.B.E., C.B., C.M.G., D.S.O., late The Royal Fusiliers (City of London Regiment), Quartermaster-General to the Forces, The War Office.
- Major-General Arthur William Hamilton May Moens, C.B., C.M.G., D.S.O., Colonel, 2nd Battalion (Sikhs), 12th Frontier Force Regiment, Indian Army, Commander, Lahore District, Northern Command, India.
- Major-General Julius Henry Bruche, C.B., C.M.G., lately Chief of the General Staff, Commonwealth of Australia.
- Major-General James Howden MacBrien, C.B., C.M.G., D.S.O., Commissioner, Royal Canadian Mounted Police, formerly Chief of Staff, Canadian Militia.
- Cecil Fane De Salis, Esq., C.B., D.L., Chairman, Territorial Army and Air Force Association of the County, of Middlesex.
- Air Marshal Arthur Murray Longmore, C.B., D.S.O., Royal Air Force.
- Air Vice-Marshal Cyril Louis Norton Newall, C.B., C.M.G., C.B.E., A.M. Royal Air Force.
- George Clarke Simpson, Esq., C.B., C.B.E., LL.D., D.Sc., F.R.S., Director of the Meteorological Office.
- Sir Edward John Harding, K.C.M.G., C.B., Permanent Under-Secretary of State for Dominion Affairs.

==== Companions (CB) ====
Military Division

Royal Navy

- Rear-Admiral Dudley Burton Napier North, C.S.L, C.M.G., C.V.O., A.D.C.
- Rear-Admiral Lewis Gonne Eyre Crabbe, C.I.E., D.S.O.
- Rear-Admiral Charles Gordon Ramsey
- Paymaster Captain Hugh Miller, D.S.O., R.N.

Army

- Major-General John Weir West, C.M.G., G.B.E., M.B., M.Ch., late Royal Army Medical Corps, Honorary Surgeon to The King, Professor of Military Surgery, Royal Army Medical College, and Consulting Surgeon to the Army.
- Major-General Ralph Bignell Ainsworth, D.S.O., O.B.E., late Royal Army Medical Corps, Honorary Physician to The King, Commandant and Director of Studies, Royal Army Medical College.
- Major-General James John Bonifant Tapley, D.S.O., late Royal Army Veterinary Corps, Director General, Army Veterinary Services, The War Office.
- Major-General Charles William Macleod, C.M.G., D.S.O., late Royal Army Service Corps, Director of Supplies and Transport, The War Office.
- Major-General Arthur Alec Goschen, D.S.O., late Royal Artillery, Commandant, Royal Military Academy, Woolwich.
- Major-General Bertram Norman Sergison-Brooke, C.M.G., D.S.O., late Grenadier Guards, General Officer Commanding, London District.
- Major-General Guy Charles Williams, O.M.G., D.S.O., late Royal Engineers, Commandant, Staff College, Quetta, India.
- Major-General Sanford John Palairet Scobell, C.M.G., D.S.O., late The Norfolk Regiment, half-pay, Commander, Bombay District, India, designate.
- Colonel honorary Brigadier-General) Arthur Hardwicke Spooner, C.M.G., D.S.O., retired pay, late The Lancashire Fusiliers, late Commander, 4th (Quetta) Infantry Brigade, Western Command, India.
- Colonel (honorary Brigadier) Vernon Monro Colquhoun Napier, C.M.G., D.S.O., retired pay, late Royal Artillery, late Commander, Royal Artillery, 3rd Division, Southern Command.
- Major-General Thomas George Ferguson Paterson, D.S.O., M.B., Indian Medical Service, Honorary Physician to The King, Deputy Director of Medical Services, Northern Command, India.
- Major-General Charles William Francis Melville, M.B., F.R.C.S., Edin., Indian Medical Service, Honorary Physician to The King, Deputy Director of Medical Services, Eastern Command, India.
- Colonel (temporary Brigadier) Bertie Cyril Penton, D.S.O., Indian Army, Deputy Adjutant and Quarter-Master-General, Western Command, India.
- Colonel John Cecil Macrae, D.S.O., retired pay, late Indian Army, late General Staff Officer, 1st Grade, India Office.
- Colonel (temporary Brigadier) Robert Johnston, D.S.O., O.B.E., Indian Army, Deputy Adjutant and Quarter-Master-General, Eastern Command, India.
- Colonel (temporary Brigadier) John Stuart Marshall, D.S.O:, O.B.E., Indian Army, Commander, Razmak Brigade, Northern Command, India.
- Colonel (temporary Brigadier) Edward Creer Norrie, D.S.O., V.D., Commander (temporary), 1st Division, Australian Military Forces.
- Major-General Ernest Charles Ashton, C.M.G., V.D., District Officer Commanding Military District Number Eleven, Dominion of Canada.
- Colonel Frank Symon, C.M.G., D.S.O., Royal New Zealand Artillery, Aide-de-Camp to The King, Director of Artillery, New Zealand Military Forces.

Air Force

- Air Vice-Marshal Frederick William Bowhill, C.M.G., D.S.O., Royal Air Force.
- Air Vice-Marshal Norman Duckworth Kerr MacEwen, C.M.G., D.S.O., Royal Air Force,
- Air Commodore Edmund Digby Maxwell Robertson, D.F.C., Royal Air Force.
- Air Vice-Marshal Richard Williams, C.B.E., D.S.O., Chief of the Air Staff, Royal Australian Air Force.

Civil Division

- Rear-Admiral Charles Wolfran Round-Turner, C.M.G.
- Rear-Admiral St. Aubyn Baldwin Wake.
- Rear-Admiral Clinton Francis Samuel Danby.
- Surgeon Rear-Admiral John Scarborough Dudding, O.B.E., M.R.C.S., L.R.C.P.
- Engineer Bear-Admiral Henry Augustus Little.
- Colonel (temporary-Brigadier) John Wallace Hudleston, A.D.C., Royal Marines.
- Colonel Charles Francis Hill Greenwood, D.S.O., O.B.E., T.D., D.L., Territorial Army (Retired).
- Honorary Colonel Francis Henry Douglas Charlton Whitmore, O.M.G., D.S.O., T.D., D.L., Chairman, Territorial Army Association of the County of Essex.
- Colonel Lionel Danyers Bailey, M.C., T.D., K.H.P., Territorial Army.
- Honorary Major Maxwell Hyslop Maxwell, C.B.E., V.D., D.L., late 2nd (Volunteer) Battalion, The King's (Liverpool) Regiment.
- Harry Egerton Wimperis, Esq., C.B.E., M.A., F.R.Ae.S., M.I.E.E., Director of Scientific Research, Air Ministry.
- William Thomas Calman, Esq., D.Sc., F.R.S., Keeper of Zoology, British Museum (Natural History), President of the Linnean Society of London.
- Ernest Tristram Crutchley, Esq., C.M.G., C.B.E., Representative in the Commonwealth of Australia of H.M. Government in the United Kingdom.
- John Donald Balfour Fergusson, Esq., Principal Private Secretary to the Chancellor of the Exchequer.
- Edward Graham Savage, Esq., Senior Chief Inspector, Board of Education.
- Frank Sturdy Sinnatt, Esq., M.B.E., D.Sc., F.I.C., Director of Fuel Research, Department of Scientific and Industrial Research.
- Arthur William Street, Esq., C.M.G., C.I.E., M.C., Principal Assistant Secretary, Ministry of Agriculture and Fisheries.
- Harold Graham Vincent, Esq., C.V.O., Principal Private Secretary to the Prime Minister.

=== Order of the Star of India ===
==== Knights Commander (KCSI) ====
- His Highness Rai-i-Rayan Maharawal Sri Lakshman Singh Bahadur, Maharawal of Dungarpur.
- His Highness Maharaja Manikya Bir Bikram Kishore Deb Barman Bahadur, Maharaja of Tripura.
- Captain His Highness Maharaja Shri Digvijaysinhji Ranjitsinhji Jadeja, Maharaja Jam Saheb of Nawanagar.
- Robert Duncan Bell, Esq., C.S.I, C.I.E., Indian Civil Service, Member of the Executive Council of the Governor of Bombay.
- Sir Maurice Linford Gwyer, K.C.B., K.C., First Parliamentary Counsel.

==== Companions (CSI) ====
- Eyre Gordon, Esq., C.I.E., Indian Civil Service, Member of the Executive Council of the Governor of the Central Provinces.
- Thomas Alexander Stewart, Esq., Indian Civil Service, Secretary to the Government of India in the Commerce Department.
- Andrew Gourlay Clow, Esq., C.I.E., Indian Civil Service, Joint Secretary to the Government of India in the Department of Industries and Labour.
- Frederic Alexander Sachse, Esq., C.I.E., Indian Civil Service, Member, Board of Revenue, Bengal.
- Edward Francis Thomas, Esq., C.I.E., Indian Civil Service, First Member, Board of Revenue, Madras.
- Colin Campbell Garbett, Esq., C.M.G., C.I.E., F.R.G.S., Indian Civil Service, lately Chief Secretary to the Government of the Punjab.
- Honorary Brigadier Geoffrey Percival Sanders, D.S.O., O.B.E., Indian Army (retired), late Commandant, Small Arms School, India.
- Charles Macdonald Lane, Esq., Indian Service of Engineers, Chief Engineer for Irrigation and Secretary to the Government of Bombay, Public Works Department, Bombay.
- Colonel Donald Brackenbury Ross, O.B.E., Indian Army-(retired), late Commander, 8th (Bareilly) Infantry Brigade.

=== Order of St Michael and St George ===
==== Knights Grand Cross (GCMG) ====
- Sir Henry Birchenough, Baronet, K.C.M.G., President of the British South Africa Company and Chairman of the Beit Trustees. For public services.
- The Right Honourable John Greig Latham, C.M.G., K.C., lately Attorney General and Minister for External Affairs, Commonwealth of Australia.
- The Honourable Sir Christopher James Parr, K.C.M.G., High Commissioner in London for the Dominion of New Zealand.
- The Right Honourable Sir William Thomas White, K.C.M.G. For public services in the Dominion of Canada.
- Sir John Loader Maffey, K.C.B., K.C.M.G., K.C.V.O., C.S.I., C.I.E., Permanent Under-Secretary of State for the Colonies.
- Sir Herbert James Read, K.C.M.G., C.B. For services to the Colonial Empire.
- His Highness Abdullah Ibn Hussein, G.B.E, K.C.M.G., Amir of Trans-Jordan. (Honorary)
- The Right Honourable Aretas Viscount Chilston, K.C.M.G., His Majesty's Ambassador Extraordinary and Plenipotentiary at Moscow.

=== Knights Commander (KCMG) ===
- The Honourable Sir James William Blair, Chief Justice and Lieutenant-Governor of the State of Queensland.
- Air Vice-Marshal Sir Philip Woolcott Game, G.B.E., K.C.B., D.S.O., lately Governor of the State of New South Wales.
- The Honourable Herbert Meredith Marler, His Majesty's Envoy Extraordinary and Minister Plenipotentiary in Japan for the Dominion of Canada.
- The Honourable Ethelbert Alfred Ransom, Minister of Lands, Dominion of New Zealand.
- The Honourable George Ritchie, Minister of Mines and Minister of Afforestation, State of South Australia.
- Percy Hubert Ezechiel, Esq., C.M.G., Third Crown Agent for the Colonies.
- Alfred John Harding, Esq., C.M.G., C.B.E., Director of Colonial Audit.
- Henry Monck-Mason Moore, Esq., C.M.G., Governor and Commander-in-Chief of the Colony of Sierra Leone.
- Geoffry Alexander Stafford Northcote, Esq., C.M.G., Governor and Commander-in-Chief of the Colony of British Guiana.
- Arthur Frederick Richards, Esq., C.M, G., Governor and Commander-in-Chief of the Colony of the Gambia.
- His Highness Abu Bakar, C.M.G., ibni almerhum Sultan Abdullah, Sultan of Pahang, Federated Malay States. (Honorary)
- Herbert Ernest Fass, Esq., C.B., O.B.E., Public Trustee, lately Financial Secretary to the Sudan Government.
- Stephen Gaselee, Esq., C.B.E., Librarian and Keeper of the Papers, Foreign Office.
- Hugh Gurney, Esq., C.M.G., M.V.O., His Majesty's Envoy Extraordinary and Minister Plenipotentiary at Copenhagen.
- George Bailey Sansom, Esq., C.M.G., Commercial Counsellor at His Majesty's Embassy in Tokio.
- Sydney Philip Perigal Waterlow, Esq., C.B.E., His Majesty's Envoy Extraordinary and Minister Plenipotentiary at Athens.

==== Companions (CMG) ====
- William James Adey, Esq., Director of Education, State of South Australia.
- George Samuel Horace Barton, Esq., D.Sc.A., Deputy Minister of Agriculture, Dominion of Canada.
- Charles Camsell, Esq., LL.D., F.R.S.C., Deputy Minister of Mines, Dominion of Canada.
- William Clifford Clark, Esq., Deputy Minister of Finance, Dominion of Canada.
- Cyrille Fraser Delage, Esq., Litt.D., LL.D., F.R.S.C., Superintendent of Education, Province of Quebec, Dominion of Canada.
- William Stuart Edwards, Esq., K.C., Deputy Minister of Justice, Dominion of Canada.
- Professor John Rawson Elder, M.A., D.Litt., Professor of History at the University of Otago, Dominion of New Zealand.
- Charles William Gordon, Esq., D.D., LL.D., F.R.C.S., President, Authors' Association, Dominion of Canada.
- Albert Edward Heath, Esq., Official Representative in London of the Government of the State of New South Wales.
- Thomas Charles Atkinson Hislop, Esq., Mayor of Wellington, Dominion of New Zealand.
- Lieutenant-Colonel Eric Dighton Mackenzie, D.S.O., Comptroller of the Household at Government House, Ottawa, Dominion of Canada.
- Simon James McLean, Esq., Assistant Chief Commissioner (Acting Chairman), Board of Railway Commissioners, Dominion of Canada.
- Edwin Vandervord Nixon, Esq., Member of the Royal Commission on Taxation, Commonwealth of Australia.
- Stephen Martin Lanigan O'Keeffe, Esq., High Commissioner in London for Southern Rhodesia.
- Lieutenant-Colonel Christopher Percy Oswald, O.B.E., Assistant Secretary (Finance), Imperial War Graves Commission.
- Ernest William Parkes, Esq., Clerk of the House of Representatives, Commonwealth of Australia.
- Frederick William Phillips, Esq., Director of Telecommunications, General Post-Office.
- The Honourable George Herbert Sedgewick, K.O., Chairman, Tariff Board, Dominion of Canada.
- Louis Edward Shapcott, Esq., M.V.O., I.S.O., Secretary, Premier's Department, State of Western Australia.
- Harry Stevenson Southam, Esq., Chairman, Board of Trustees, National Gallery, Dominion of Canada.
- Thomas Hollis Walker, Esq., K.C., Recorder of Derby. For services as Chairman of meetings of representatives of non-political Empire organisations in London.
- The Honourable Alan Lindsay Wardlaw, Member of the Legislative Council, State of Tasmania.
- James Hossack Woods, Esq. For public services in the Dominion of Canada.
- Edmund Blaikie Boyd, Esq., Principal Private Secretary to the Secretary of State for the Colonies.
- Charles Valentine Brayne, Esq., Commissioner of Lands, Ceylon.
- Arthur Mortimer Champion, Esq., Provincial Commissioner, 2nd Grade, Kenya.
- David Duff, Esq., M.D., Director of Medical Services, Gold Coast.
- Thomas Fitzgerald, Esq., O.B.E., Postmaster-General, Kenya-Uganda-Tanganyika.
- Major Ralph Dolignon Furse, D.S.O., Director of Recruitment, Colonial Office.
- John Hathorn Hall, Esq., D.S.O., Q.B.E., M.C., Chief Secretary, Palestine.
- Ernest Harrison, Esq., B.Sc., Director of Agriculture, Tanganyika Territory.
- Samuel Burnside Boyd McElderry, Esq., Chief Secretary, Zanzibar.
- John Alexander Maybin, Esq., Chief Secretary, Nigeria.
- Henry Bradshaw Popham, Esq., M.B.E., Administrator, Dominica, Leeward Islands.
- Thomas Frederick Sandford, Esq., M.B.E., Provincial Commissioner, Northern Rhodesia.
- Eubule John Waddington, Esq., O.B.E., Colonial Secretary, Bermuda.
- Armigel de Vins Wade, Esq., O.B.E., Colonial Secretary, Kenya.
- Maxwell MacLagan Wedderburn, Esq., Deputy Chief Secretary, Ceylon. '
- Edward Jocelyn Wortley, Esq., O.B.E., Director of Agriculture, Trinidad.

Honorary Members

- Burhan-uddin ibni Almerhum Yam Tuan Antah, Tengku, Besar of Sri Menanti, Federated Malay States.
- Nasir Bin Shaif, Amir Dhali, Aden Protectorate.

=== Order of the Indian Empire ===
==== Knight Grand Commander (GCIE) ====
- His Highness Sri Padmanabha Dasa Vanchi Pala Rama Varma Kulasekhara Kiritapati Manney Sultan Maharaja Raja Ramaraja Bahadur Shamsher Jang, Maharaja of Travancore.
- Captain His Highness Saramad-i-Rajaha-i-Hindustan Raj Rajindra Sri Maharajadhiraja Sawai Man Singh Bahadur, Maharaja of Jaipur.
- Sir Samuel Findlater Stewart, K.C.B., K.C.I.E., C.S.I., Permanent Under-Secretary of State for India.

==== Knights Commander (KCIE) ====
- Sir Campbell Ward Rhodes, C.B.E., lately Member of the Council of India.
- Raja Sri Ravu Swetachalupati Ramakrishna Ranga Rao Bahadur, Raja of Bobbili, Minister for Local Self-Government to the Governor of Madras.
- Raja Brijnath Singh, Raja of Maihar.
- Courtenay Latimer, Esq., O.S.I., C.I.E., of the Political Department, Agent to the Governor-General in the States of Western India.
- Abraham James Laine, Esq., C.I.E., Indian Civil Service, Member of the Executive Council of the Governor of Assam.
- George Cunningham, Esq., C.S.I., C.I.E., O.B.E., of the Political Department. Member of the Executive Council of the Governor of the North-West Frontier Province.
- Major-General Ernest Frederick Orton, C.B., Indian Army, Deputy Quartermaster-General, Army Headquarters, India.
- Major-General Dennis Deane, C.B., D.S.O., Indian Army, Commander, Burma (Independent) District.
- Rao Bahadur Sir Annepu Parasuramadas Patro, Garu, Member of the Madras Legislative Council.
- Leonard Day Wakely, Esq., C.B., Deputy Under Secretary of State for India.

=== Royal Victorian Chain ===
- Rowland Thomas, Earl of Cromer, P.C., G.C.B., G.C.I.E., G.C.V.O.

=== Royal Victorian Order ===
==== Knight Grand Cross (GCVO) ====
- George Francis Hugh, Marquess of Cambridge, K.C.V.O.
- The Right Honourable John Colin Campbell Davidson, C.H., C.B., M.P.
- Sir Hugh Percy Allen, K.C.V.O., Mus.D.
- Colonel Sir Arthur Edward Erskine, K.C.V.O., D.S.O.
- Sir Edwin Cooper Perry, M.D.

==== Knight Commander (KCVO) ====
- Sir Stephen Henry Molyneux Killik.
- Sir Robert Vaughan Gower, O.B.E., M.P.
- Francis James Grant, Esq, C.V.O.
- The Very Reverend Walter Robert Matthews, D.D., Dean of St. Paul's.
- Rear Admiral Thomas John Spence Lyne, C.B., D.S.O.
- Major The Honourable Richard Frederick Molyneux, C.V.O.
- Frederick Albert Minter, Esq, C.V.O.
- James Albert Walton, Esq, M.S.
- Lancelot Edward Barrington-Ward, Esq, M.B., surgeon

==== Commander (CVO) ====
- Lieutenant-Colonel Lord Alastair Robert Innes-Ker, D.S.O.
- Rear Admiral Arthur Bromley, C.M.G.
- Colonel Edward Charles Heath, D.S.O.
- Lieutenant-Colonel Norman Gibb Scorgie, C.B.E., M.V.O.
- Commander Harold George Campbell, D.S.O., R.N. (Retired).
- Commander Oscar Henderson, C.B.E., D.S.O., R.N. (Retired)
- Major Colin Lindsay Gordon, M.V.O.
- The Reverend Henry Tower, M.V.O.
- Duncan Randolph Wilson, Esquire, C.B.E.
- Thomas Francis Vaughan Prickard, Esquire, M.V.O.
- Herbert Walter Lloyd Evans, Esquire, O.B.E.
- Stanley Marchant, Esquire, Mus.D.
- Charles Gordon Holland Moore, Esquire, M.B.
- Captain Edward Daymonde Stevenson, M.C.

==== Member, Fourth Class ====
- Lieutenant-Colonel Roland Dening, M.C., Indian Army.
- Major John Charles Oakes Marriott, D.S.O., M.C., Scots Guards.
- Captain Humphrey Clifford Lloyd, M.C.
- Captain Howard de Courcy Martelli, M.C.
- Captain FitzRoy Hubert Fyers.
- George Rothe Bellew, Esquire.
- George William Sadler, Esquire.

==== Member, Fifth Class ====
- Gerald Cock, Esquire (Dated 6 May 1935).
- James Thomas Carter, Esquire.
- Lieutenant William James Dunn, M.C., Royal Horse Guards.
- Thomas Henry Carter, Esquire.

=== Order of the British Empire ===
==== Knights Grand Cross (GBE) ====
- General Sir Felix Fordati Ready, K.C.B., C.S.I., C.M.G., D.S.O., retired pay, Colonel, The Royal Berkshire Regiment(Princess Charlotte of Wales's), late Quarter-Master-General to the Forces, The War Office
- Sir George Newman, K.C.B., M.D., lately Chief Medical Officer, Ministry of Health and Board of Education.
- Edward Wentworth Beatty, Esq., K.C., LL.D., Chancellor, McGill University, and President of the Boy Scouts Association, Dominion of Canada.
- Sir Ibrahim Rahimtoola, K.C.S.I., C.I.E., ex President of the Legislative Assembly.
- His Highness Ibrahim, G.C.M.G., K.B.E., Sultan of Johore.
- His Highness Seyyid Khalifa bin Harub, K.C.M.G., K.B.E., Sultan of Zanzibar.

==== Knights Commander (KBE) ====
- Vice-Admiral Henry Karslake Kitson, O.B. (Retired).
- Vice-Admiral William Munro Kerr, C.B., C.B.E.
- Engineer Rear-Admiral Robert Beeman, C.B., C.M.G.
- Paymaster Rear-Admiral Henshaw Robert Russell, C.B., C.M.G. (Retired).
- Lieutenant-General John Edward Spencer Brind, C.B., C.M.G., D.S.O., late Royal Artillery, half-pay, late Commander, 4th Division, Eastern Command.
- Major-General Eric Stanley Girdwood, C.B., C.M.G., Colonel, The Cameronians (Scottish Rifles), General Officer Commanding Northern Ireland District.
- Major-General Edward Evans, C.B., C.M.G., D.S.O., retired pay, Colonel The Wiltshire Regiment (Duke of Edinburgh's), late Major-General in charge of Administration, Aldershot Command.
- Major-General Hugh Keppel Bethell, C.B., C.M.G., C.V.O., D.S.O., half-pay, late 7th Queen's Own Hussars, late Commander, Presidency and Assam District, India.
- Major-General Sir William Livingstone Hatchwell Sinclair-Burgess, C.B., C.M.G., D.S.O., New Zealand Staff Corps, General Officer Commanding and Chief of the General Staff, New Zealand Military Forces
- Air Vice-Marshal John Mclntyre, C.B., M.C., M.B., B..Ch., Royal Air Force (Retired)
- Walter McLennan Citrine, Esq., General Secretary of the Trades Union Congress.
- Sir Francis L'Estrange Joseph, C.B.E., J.P., D.L., for public services
- William Wallace McKechnie, Esq., C.B., Secretary, Scottish Education Department.
- George William Martin, Esq., J.P., Alderman of Leeds County Borough. For outstanding municipal services. On the occasion of the centenary of local government.
- Reginald James Gresham Olive Paterson, Esq., C.B., Deputy Under Secretary of State, War Office.
- William Young, Esq., C.B., Deputy Chairman, Board of Customs and Excise.
- George Arthur Warrington Booth, Esq., Judicial Adviser to the Egyptian Government.
- George Kenrick, Esq., a British resident in Valparaiso
- Arthur George Doughty, Esq., C.M.G., Litt.D., LL.D., F.R.S.C., Archivist Emeritus, and Chairman, Public Records Commission, Dominion of Canada.
- Brigadier-General Herbert Ernest Hart, C.B., C.M.G., D.S.O., V.D., Administrator of Western Samoa.
- John Cunningham M'Lennan, Esq., O.B.E., F.R.S., Ph.D., D.Sc., LL.D., F.R.S.C., Professor Emeritus and Visiting Professor of Physics, University of Toronto, Dominion of Canada. For fundamental discoveries in physics and scientific services.
- Sir Alan William Pirn, K.C.I.E., C.S.I., lately Commissioner to enquire into the financial and economic position of Basutoland, Bechuanaland Protectorate and Swaziland.
- Girja Shankar Bajpai, Esq., C.I.E., C.B.E., Indian Civil Service, Secretary to the Government of India in the Department of Education, Health and Lands.
- Hormusji Peroshaw Mody, Esq., M.L.A., ex President, Millowners' Association, Bombay
- Richard Olaf Winstedt, Esq., C.M.G., M.A., D.Litt., lately General Adviser, Johore.

==== Dames Commander (DBE) ====
- Maria Matilda (May), Mrs. Ogilvie Gordon, D.Sc., D.Ph., J.P., Vice President of the International Council of Women and former President of the National Council of Women. For public work on behalf of women and children.
- Miss Rosalind Paget, A.R.R.C. For services to Nursing.
- Winifrid Anne, Duchess of Portland. For services, especially in Nottinghamshire.
- Annie Jean, Mrs. Connor, M.D. For services in connection with maternal and child welfare in the Commonwealth of Australia.
- Miss Constance Elizabeth D'Arcy, M.B. For services in connection with maternal and child welfare in the Commonwealth of Australia
- Ethel, Lady MacDonald, R.R.C., Member of the Executive Committee of the Overseas Nursing Association.

==== Commander (CBE) ====
- Rear-Admiral Laurence Richard Oliphant (Retired).
- Captain Hamilton Burnett Hall, O.B.E., R.N. (Retired).
- Captain Frank Reginald Willis, R.N. (Retired).
- Engineer Captain Sydney Rupert Dight, R.N.
- Instructor Captain Arthur Edward Hall, O.B.E., A.R.C.S., R.N.
- Captain William Arthur Hawkes, R.D. A.D.C., R.N.R.
- Captain Cuthbert John Pope, R.A.N
- Colonel Wallace Benson, D.S.O., M.B., late Royal Army Medical Corps, Assistant Director of Medical Services, London.
- Colonel William MacCormac Burden, M.I.Mech.E., late Royal Artillery, Chief Superintendent, Research Department, Royal Arsenal, Woolwich.
- Colonel William Henry Cunningham, D.S.O., V.D., Commander, 2nd New Zealand Infantry Brigade, New Zealand Military Forces.
- Colonel George Nowers Dyer, D.S.O., late The Queen's Royal Regiment (West Surrey), Inspector of Physical Training, The War Office.
- Colonel Herbert Clarence Hurst, D.S.O., V.D., Commander, 3rd New Zealand Mounted Rifles Brigade, New Zealand Military Forces.
- Colonel William Rice Meredith, D.S.O., Commandant, The Nigeria Regiment, Royal West African Frontier Force.
- Colonel (temporary Brigadier) Arthur James Mills, D.S.O., V.D., Commander, 1st Cavalry Division, Australian Military Forces.
- Colonel and Ordnance Mechanical Engineer 1st Class, James Jesse Mills, O.B.E., M.I.Mech.E., retired pay, late Royal Army Ordnance Corps, late Assistant Director of Ordnance Services, The War Office.
- Major and Brevet Lieutenant-Colonel (temporary Lieutenant-Colonel) Henry Willis O'Connor, D.S.O., Princess Patricia's Canadian Light Infantry, Aide-de-Camp to the Governor-General of the Dominion of Canada.
- Lieutenant-Colonel and Brevet Colonel William Eric Walker, T.D., Officer Commanding 72nd (Northumbrian) Field Brigade, Royal Artillery, Territorial Army.
- Colonel Benyon Rudgard Benyon-Winsor, T.D., Territorial Army, Honorary Colonel 81st (Welsh) Field Brigade, Royal Artillery, Territorial Army.
- Group Captain Charles Gainer Smith, O.B.E., Royal Air Force.
- Group Captain Herbert John Down, Royal Air Force.
- Matron-in-Chief, Miss Katherine Christie Watt, R.R.C., Princess Mary's Royal Air Force Nursing Service
- William Fleming Bewley, Esq., D.Sc., Director of the Experimental and Research Station of the Ministry of Agriculture and Fisheries at Cheshunt.
- Miss Elizabeth Bolton, M.D., B.S., Dean of the London (Royal Free Hospital) School of Medicine for Women. Senior Surgeon, Elizabeth Garrett Anderson Hospital.
- Harold Chalton Bradshaw, Esq., F.R.I.B.A., Secretary of the Royal Fine Art Commission.
- George William Brooks, Esq., Vice-President of the Co-operative Wholesale Society.
- John Brown Clark, Esq., M.A., LL.D., F.R.S.E., J.P., formerly Headmaster of George Heriot's School, Edinburgh. For services to Education.
- Annie, Mrs. Combridge. For political and public services in Birmingham.
- William Allison Davies, Esq., O.B.E., Borough Treasurer of Preston. Honorary Treasurer of the Institute of Municipal Treasurers and Accountants. On the occasion of the centenary of local government.
- Alfred Fowler, Esq., F.R.S., Sc.D., D.Sc., Emeritus Professor of Astro-Physics, Imperial College, South Kensington. For services to Science.
- Edward George Fudge, Esq., Assistant Under-secretary, Mines Department.
- Ernest John Gayes, Esq., Surveyor, General Post Office.
- Thomas Lennox Gilmour, Esq., Vice-Chairman, National Savings Committee.
- David Rhys Grenfell, Esq., J.P., M.P., Member of Parliament for the Gower Division of Glamorganshire since 1922.
- Sam Hield Hamer, Esq., Secretary of the National Trust, 1911-34.
- Alderman Arthur Harbord, J.P., M.P., Member of Parliament for Great Yarmouth, 1922–24, and since 1929. For political and public services.
- Robert Vincent Headland, Esq., O.B.E., Assistant Secretary, Mercantile Marine Department, Board of Trade.
- Levi Clement Hill, Esq., Secretary, National Association of Local Government Officers. On the occasion of the centenary of local government.
- George Edward Woods Humphery, Esq., O.B.E., Managing Director, Imperial Air
- Alderman Charles Joseph Knight, Traffic Commissioner, South-Eastern Area.
- Ivison Stevenson Macadam, Esq., O.B.E., Secretary, Royal Institute of International Affairs.
- James Jesse McKinnell, Esq., J.P. For political and public services in Rugby.
- Miss Musette Francis Jacqueline Natalie Majendie, Organiser of the Hedingham Scouts Training and Employment Scheme.
- William Waller Marsh, Esq., Assistant Secretary, Ministry of Labour.
- Miss Hilda Martindale, O.B.E., Director of Women Establishments, H.M. Treasury.
- Harold Tibbatts Miller, Esq., M.B.E., Secretary to the Corporation of Trinity House.
- Miss Hilda Maud Milsom, O.B.E., Chief Clerk, Private Secretary's Office, Buckingham Palace.
- Frederic Stanley Osgood, Esq., M.V.O., O.B.E., Secretary, Lord Chamberlain's Office, Buckingham Palace.
- Louis George Stanley Reynolds, Esq., O.B.E., Assistant Secretary, Air Ministry.
- Charles John Ritchie, Esq., O.B.E., J.P., Deputy Commandant-in-Chief, Metropolitan Special Constabulary.
- Arthur Shaw, Esq., J.P., General Secretary of the National Union of Textile Workers.
- Nevil Vincent Sidgwick, Esq., O.B.E., M.A., F.R.S., Reader of Chemistry at Oxford University. For services to Science.
- Agnes, Mrs. Taunton, J.P. For public and social services in Birmingham.
- Joseph Turner Taylor, Esq., Town Clerk of Harrogate
- Alexander Annan Adams, Esq., Commercial Secretary at His Majesty's Legation at Bucharest.
- Arthur Dickinson Blackburn, Esq., His Majesty's Consul at Shanghai.
- The Reverend Canon Joseph Thomas Stevenson, late Headmaster of St. George's College, Quilmes, Argentina.
- Llewellyn Evan Thomas, Esq., a British subject formerly resident in Antwerp.
- Captain Richard Cyril Rae Whalley, His Majesty's Consul at Maji, Ethiopia.

- Ada Mary, Mrs. a'Beckett, President of the Free Kindergarten Union, State of Victoria.
- Major The Honourable Arthur Edmund Colvin, M.C., M.B., Chairman of the Hospitals Commission, State of New South Wales.
- Cecil Evelyn Cook, Esq., M.D., Chief Protector of Aborigines, Northern Territory, Commonwealth of Australia.
- Hamilton William Dyke, Esq., M.B., Principal Medical Officer, Bechuanaland Protectorate.
- Edward Johnson, Esq., LL.D., Mus. Doc. For services to music in the Dominion of Canada.
- Laurence Edward Keegan, Esq., M.D., Superintendent, General Hospital, Newfoundland.
- Hugh McConaghy, Esq., Chairman, Tariff Board, Commonwealth of Australia.
- Robert Edward McKechnie, Esq., M.D., C.M., LL.D., F.A.C.S., F.R.C.S., Chancellor, University of British Columbia. For public services to medicine and education in the Dominion of Canada.
- Merchant Mahoney, Esq., Commercial Secretary at the Legation at Washington of the Dominion of Canada.
- Ernest Marsden, Esq., M.C., D.S.O., Secretary, Department of Scientific and Industrial Research, Dominion of New Zealand.
- William Ezra Matthews, Esq., Chairman, Federal District Commission, Dominion of Canada.
- William Losh Miller, Esq., D.Ph. President of the Royal Society of Canada.
- Samuel Milligan, Esq., lately representative of the Empire Cotton Growing Corporation in South Africa.
- Colonel John Sidney Morris, Commissioner, British South Africa Police, Southern Rhodesia.
- Colonel Henry Campbell Osborne, C.M.G., V.D., Honorary Aide-de-Camp to the Governor-General of the Dominion of Canada. For services to dramatic art in the Dominion of Canada.
- Miss Helen Richmond Young Reid, B.A., LL.D. For philanthropic services in the Dominion of Canada.
- Frank Thomas Shutt, Esq., D.S.C., F.I.C., F.C.S., F.R.S.C., lately Dominion Chemist, Dominion of Canada.
- Henry Ernest Turner, Esq., Secretary, Empire Press Union
- Sarah Trumbull, Mrs. Warren, Chief Commissioner, Girl Guides Association, Dominion of Canada.
- Michael Herbert Watt, Esq., M.D., Director General of Health, Dominion of New Zealand.
- David Alexander Smyth, Esq, Indian Police, Deputy Inspector-General of Police, Central Provinces.
- Lieutenant-Colonel Claude Blake Rubie, Manager, Messrs. Phipson and Company, Karachi, Bombay.
- Major Jack Brittain Jones, Comptroller of His Excellency the Viceroy's Household.
- Miss Millicent Vere Webb, Chief Medical Officer, Women's Medical Service, and Secretary of the Funds under the Presidency of the Countess of Willingdon.
- Malcolm Ramsay Atkins, Esq., Chief Engineer, Calcutta Improvement Trust, Bengal.
- Khan Bahadur Syed Maratib All, Army Contractor, Punjab.
- Charles Leslie Cox, Esq., Director of Public Works, Nigeria.
- George William Marshall Findlay, Esq., O.B.E., M.D., D.Sc., Member of the scientific staff of the Wellcome Research Institution, London. For services in connection with the study and prevention of yellow fever.
- Major William Bain Gray, M.A., Ph.D., B.Litt., Director of Education, British Guiana.
- Frederick William Adolph Handman, Esq., M.Inst.C.E., Resident Engineer in connection with the construction of the Lower Zambesi Bridge, Nyasaland Protectorate.
- Walter Kingsbury Moore, Esq. For public services in the Bahamas.
- Wilfred Frank Poulton, Esq., M.R.C.V.S., Director of Veterinary Services, Uganda Protectorate
- Charles Johnston Smith, Esq., O.B.E., M.B., F.R.C.S., Senior Surgeon, Singapore, Straits Settlements.
- Seen Wan Ts'o, Esq., O.B.E., LL.D. For public services in Hong Kong
- Mustafa Bey el Khaldi, Puisne Judge, Supreme Court, Palestine. (honorary)

==== Officer (OBE) ====
- Lucy Maud Montgomery - author from the Dominion of Canada.

=== Order of the Companions of Honour ===
- The Hon William Napier Bruce, C.B., lately Pro-Chancellor of the University of Wales.
- The Very Rev John White, D.D., LL.D., Minister of the Barony of Glasgow, First Moderator of the General Assembly of the United Church of Scotland, 1929.
