= Engineer officer (Royal Navy) =

Officer in the UK Royal Navy

An Engineer Officer is a type of officer in the UK Royal Navy. There are also Warfare Officers and Logistics Officers (formerly called Supply Officers) supported by additional branches such as Medical or Dental Officers, or the Chaplaincy Service.

Engineer Officers are responsible for the material condition of the various aspects of maritime platforms: Ships, Submarines and Naval Aircraft and as such lead teams of naval ratings to conduct preventive and corrective maintenance. Engineer Officers are responsible to the Captain for the operational capability of the platform and as such form part of the Command Team. Engineers are also widely employed in the Defence Equipment and Support and in the United Kingdom Ministry of Defence, supporting the Fleet or other elements of the British Armed Forces.

== Specialisations ==
Four sub-branches of Engineer exist:

=== Marine Engineer ===
Marine Engineer Officers are responsible for the fabric of the ship or submarine, including its propulsion and steering systems, hotel and domestic services and damage control/ fire fighting equipment.

=== Weapon Engineer ===
Weapon Engineer Officers are responsible for the performance of onboard weapons, sensors, combat systems and communications systems. you must have a technical mind and an interest in electronics for this position.

=== Air Engineer ===
Air Engineers are responsible for the performance of fixed and rotary wing aircraft afloat and ashore.

=== Training Management ===
Training Management Officers are responsible for the management of training activities across the Royal Navy. Formed from the Instructor Officer branch, the role is predominantly a Human Capital function. However the position within the Engineer Branch reflects the high volume of engineering training carried out by the Royal Navy, with many Training Management Officers employed at HMS Collingwood and HMS Sultan.

== Training ==
Engineer Officers entering the Royal Navy are required to be graduates with a suitably numerate degree, however some may have been sponsored with the Defence Technical Undergraduate Scheme at University of Portsmouth, Aston University, University of Birmingham, Loughborough University, Northumbria University, University of Newcastle upon Tyne or University of Southampton. Senior Ratings of the appropriate sub-specialisation may also be commissioned as Engineer Officers on the Senior Upper Yardman Scheme.

New Entry training is undertaken at Britannia Royal Naval College where the courses vary slightly for new entry and SUY cadets. New Entry officers then undergo Common Fleet Time (4 months) where they learn the ropes in an operational warship using a syllabus common to all Officer specialisations; completing the Fleet Board to be permitted to continue to further training of Specialist Fleet Time attached to the department appropriate to their sub-specialisation. SUY Officers proceed directly to their specialist training waiving Fleet Time on the basis of their proven experience.

Engineer Officers then undergo further training appropriate to their sub-specialisation. Weapon Engineers and Information Systems Engineers at HMS Collingwood, Marine Engineers and Aircraft Engineers at HMS Sultan and Training Managers at HMS Nelson. Training is structured and accredited by a number of professional bodies leading to the potential award of Chartered Engineer status.
