= Engineer officer =

An engineering officer can be a Merchant Navy engineer, or a commissioned officer in the British Armed Forces with responsibility for military engineering.

In the Royal Navy (RN), Engineering Officers are responsible for the material condition of ships, submarines, and naval aircraft.

In the Royal Air Force (RAF), Engineering Officers are responsible for weapons and aircraft systems and electronics communications systems.

(Air) Engineering Officer appointment examples
NATO rank	Royal Navy	British Army	Royal Air Force
OF-2	Assistant/Deputy (Air) Engineering Officer	Light Aid Detachment Commander	Junior Engineering Officer
OF-3	(Air) Engineering Officer	Support Company Commander	Senior Engineering Officer
OF-4	Commander AE	Equipment Support Battalion Commander	Officer Commanding Engineering and Logistics Wing
