= Mate (naval officer) =

Naval officer

A mate is a deck naval officer aboard a merchant vessel, such as the chief mate (first mate), second mate, or third mate. Between 1800 and 1890 "mate" was also the naval rank now known as sub-lieutenant—master.

One of the mates is always the watch keeping officer, unless the master takes that responsibility. Each mate also has other duties, such as making the passage planning, overseeing loading and unloading and personnel management.

The United States Navy had the rank of mate from the mid-1800s until the early 20th century. Mates in the US Navy were junior warrant officers, originally known as masters mates, who assisted a ship's sailing master.

From 1912 to 1931, mate was a commissioned rank within the Royal Navy, for ratings who were selected for a commission through the Mate Scheme. Commissioned mates ranked with sub-lieutenants. In 1931, the scheme was renamed to the Upper Yardman Scheme, and those who selected under it were promoted to sub-lieutenant instead.

== See also ==
- Boatswain ("Boatswain's mate")
- Gunner's mate
- Shipmate
