= Charles Valentine Brayne =

British colonial administrator (1877–1964)

Charles Valentine Brayne CMG
- Born: 17 August 1877; Edgebaston
- Died: 16 November 1964 (aged 87)
- Education: Pembroke College, Cambridge
- Occupation: Colonial administrative service officer
- Years active: 1901–1935
- Children: 3 daughters
- Relatives: Frank Lugard Brayne (brother)

Charles Valentine Brayne CMG (17 August 1877 – 16 November 1964) was a British colonial administrator who served in British Ceylon.

== Early life and education ==
Brayne was born on 17 August 1877 in Edgbaston, Warwickshire, the third son of Rev R. Brayne, Rector of Combe Hay, Somerset. He was educated at Monkton Combe School, and Pembroke College, Cambridge where he received his BA in 1899.

== Career ==
Brayne entered the Ceylon civil service in 1901 as a cadet at Jaffna District. He then transferred to Mannar District (1903) and then served as assistant to the Government Agent at Anuradhapura (1903); Assistant Collector of Customs, Trincomalee (1905); Assistant Government Agent, Northern Province (1906); District Judge at Badulla (1909); Assistant Government Agent, Colombo (1912), and Assistant Government Agent, Kalutara (1914–1916).

Brayne was appointed Special Commissioner for the Western Province in response to the 1915 Ceylonese riots which led to the declaration of martial law and resulted in over 100 deaths. Vested with the powers of a district judge and police magistrate, he was active in attempts to quell the riots, coordinating arrests of rioters, disarming villagers, recovering looted property and awarding compensation.

In 1920, Brayne was promoted to Government Agent of Western Province. In 1927, he served as Acting Controller of Revenue and was appointed a member of the Executive and Legislative Councils. He devised the Peasant Proprietors' Land Scheme to increase land ownership of farmers and encourage more food production. He then served as Commissioner of Lands, Ceylon (1931–1935). After he retired to England, he served as a member of Leatherhead Urban District Council (1938–1947).

== Personal life and death ==
Brayne married Amy Goodchild in 1906, with whom he had three daughters, and in 1922, married Blodwen Price.

Brayne died on 16 November 1964, aged 87.

== Honours ==
Brayne was appointed Companion of the Order of St Michael and St George (CMG) in the 1935 Birthday Honours.
