= George Fossett Roberts =

Sir George Fossett Roberts (1 November 1870 – 8 or 9 April 1954) was a Welsh army officer and Conservative politician.

Roberts was born in Aberystwyth, the son of David and Maria Roberts, and was privately educated in Cheltenham. In 1890 he became manager of his father's brewery business. His father was a local politician, and George Fossett Roberts stood unsuccessfully for Parliament on behalf of the Conservative Party. In 1896 he married Mary Parry. He followed his father onto the town council in 1902 and was mayor for the first time in 1912. He was also elected to Cardiganshire County Council.

When the First World War broke out, he was appointed Staff Officer of the Embarkation Staff. He remained in the forces after the war, and led the 102nd Field Brigade of the Royal Artillery from 1921 until 1925. In 1933 he became Honorary Colonel of the 146th Medium Regiment of the Royal Artillery. He was knighted in the 1935 Birthday Honours "for political and public services in Cardiganshire".

He was always involved with the work and administration of the National Library of Wales, of which he became Treasurer in 1939. In 1944, he became president, a position he held until 1950. His wife died in 1947, leaving two daughters. Roberts died at Glan Paith, a home the couple had inherited from his father-in-law, a solicitor.
