= Fleet board =

Fleet board is a term in the Royal Navy for the examination cadet officers take which qualifies them to become commissioned officers.

After passing the examination, officers who entered as sub-lieutenants have their commissions backdated to the date when they entered the Royal Navy. Midshipmen are also considered commissioned officers at this point, but are not immediately promoted to sub-lieutenant. Between 1955 and 1993, midshipmen were promoted to the rank acting sub-lieutenant after passing the fleet board, but today this rank is only used in the Royal Naval Reserve. After 1955, midshipmen were no longer allowed to serve in the fleet as officers, so in practice they only serve a few weeks as commissioned midshipmen while completing their post-examination training.

Similar examinations are also used for a similar purpose in other Commonwealth navies, notably the Royal Australian Navy, the Royal Canadian Navy and the Royal New Zealand Navy.

== See also ==
- Warfare officer
