= Upper Yardman Scheme =

Officer training scheme in the Royal Navy

The Upper Yardman Scheme had its origin in 1912, when Admiral Prince Louis of Battenberg, the then First Sea Lord, initiated a scheme to allow Royal Navy ratings the chance to gain a commission at a relatively young age and so enable them to compete for promotion to the highest ranks. Until 1931 it was known as the Mate Scheme because successful candidates were promoted to the rank of mate, but that title was very much disliked, and from 1932 onwards the scheme became known as the Upper Yardman Scheme, those successful being promoted to the rank of sub-lieutenant.

The term "upper yardman" originally denoted a seaman who manned the uppermost yards on a square-rigged ship, which required considerable bravery and skill. Its adoption served to reinforce the superiority of the officer candidates to the rest of the lower deck.

== Selection, training and promotion ==
Selection for training as an upper yardman starts with a recommendation from a divisional officer that a rating be considered as a CW (Commissions and Warrants) Candidate. If this is approved by the captain of the prospective candidate's ship, the candidate commences a year's probation and then appears before the Admiralty Interview Board for consideration for acceptance as an upper yardman. Successful candidates then commence training lasting a year or more, those who pass being promoted to acting sub-lieutenant.

Initially, the upper age limit for upper yardmen was 25, but since 1972 the scheme has accepted candidates in two age groups: upper yardmen (UY) up to 25 years old with promotion prospects similar to those of direct entry officer cadets, and senior upper yardmen (SUY) of 35 years and older who remain within the specialisation of their rating career.

== Training locations ==
At most times since the inauguration of the scheme, upper yardmen training has taken place in shore establishments especially commissioned for that purpose or in separate units within existing shore establishments. These have included:

- Prior to 1942 – HMS Collingwood, Fareham, Hampshire
- 1942 – HMS Raleigh, Torpoint, Cornwall
- 1949 – HMS Hawke, Exbury House, Southampton, Hampshire (previously HMS King Alfred – RNVR)
- 1955 – HMS Temeraire, Port Edgar, West Lothian
- 1960 – Britannia Royal Naval College, Dartmouth, Devon

Royal Navy candidates were joined by candidates from the Royal Australian Navy, the Royal Canadian Navy and the Royal New Zealand Navy until the 1960s.

== Officers promoted under the scheme ==
- Rear-Admiral James Figgins (commissioned in 1912): first officer promoted under the scheme to reach the rank of captain (1933)
- Vice-Admiral Sir Benjamin Charles Stanley Martin (commissioned in 1916): first officer promoted under the scheme to reach flag rank (1944)
- Admiral Sir Philip King Enright (commissioned in 1917): first officer promoted under the scheme to reach the rank of admiral (1953)
