= ATCvet code QI20 =

Veterinary medical products classification subgroup

ATCvet code QI20 Immunologicals for other species is a therapeutic subgroup of the Anatomical Therapeutic Chemical Classification System for veterinary medicinal products, a system of alphanumeric codes developed by the World Health Organization (WHO) for the classification of drugs and other medical products for veterinary use. Subgroup QI20 is part of the anatomical group QI Immunologicals.

National versions of the ATC classification may include additional codes not present in this list, which follows the WHO version.

== QI20A Red Deer ==
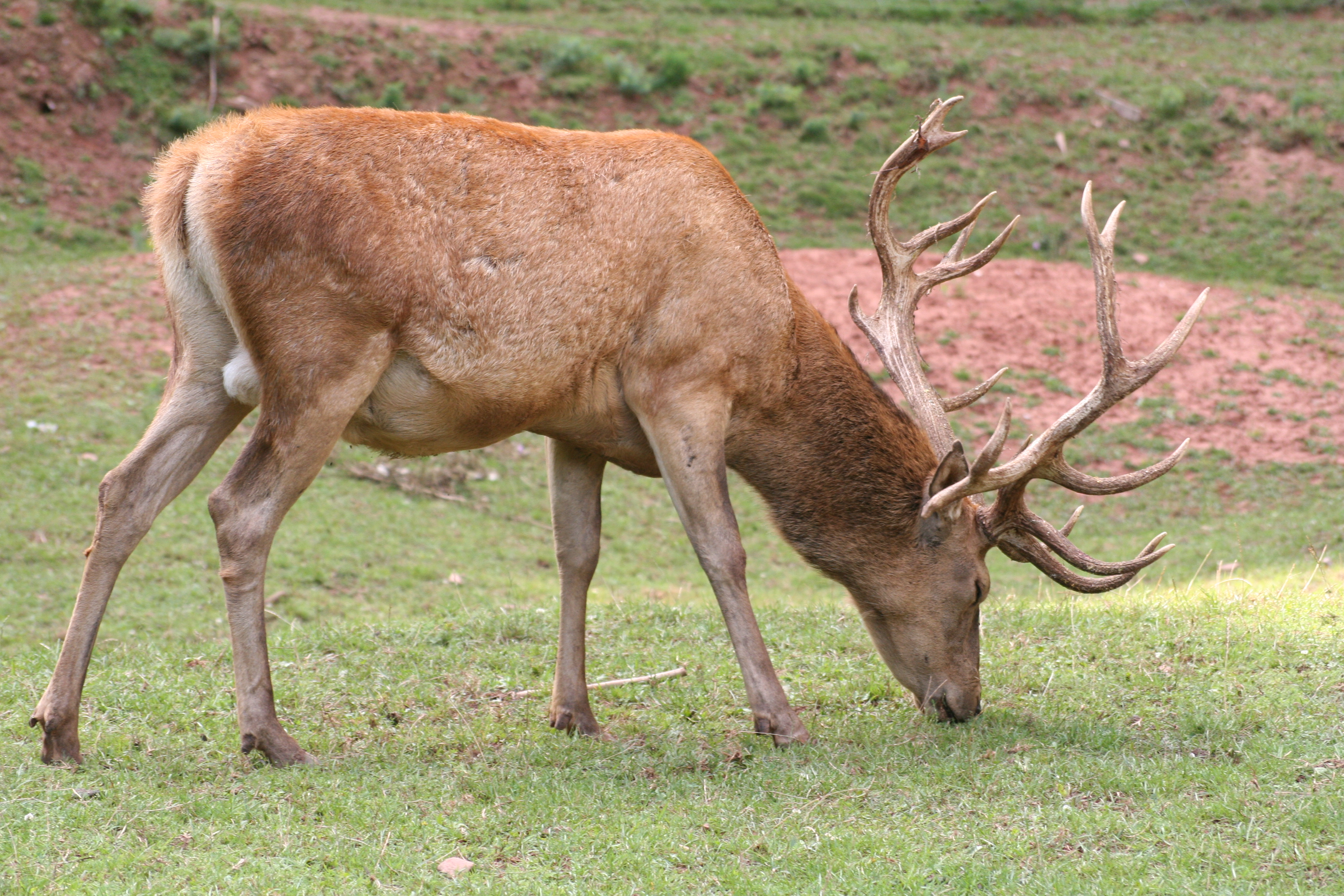

=== QI20AA Inactivated viral vaccines ===
Empty group

=== QI20AB Inactivated bacterial vaccines (including mycoplasma, toxoid and chlamydia) ===
QI20AB01 Mycobacteria

=== QI20AC Inactivated bacterial vaccines and antisera ===
Empty group

=== QI20AD Live viral vaccines ===
Empty group

=== QI20AE Live bacterial vaccines ===
Empty group

=== QI20AF Live bacterial and viral vaccines ===
Empty group

=== QI20AG Live and inactivated bacterial vaccines ===
Empty group

=== QI20AH Live and inactivated viral vaccines ===
Empty group

=== QI20AI Live viral and inactivated bacterial vaccines ===
Empty group

=== QI20AJ Live and inactivated viral and bacterial vaccines ===
Empty group

=== QI20AK Inactivated viral and live bacterial vaccines ===
Empty group

=== QI20AL Inactivated viral and inactivated bacterial vaccines ===
Empty group

=== QI20AM Antisera, immunoglobulin preparations, and antitoxins ===
Empty group

=== QI20AN Live parasitic vaccines ===
Empty group

=== QI20AO Inactivated parasitic vaccines ===
Empty group

=== QI20AP Live fungal vaccines ===
Empty group

=== QI20AQ Inactivated fungal vaccines ===
Empty group

=== QI20AR In vivo diagnostic preparations ===
Empty group

=== QI20AS Allergens ===
Empty group

=== QI20AT Colostrum preparations and substitutes ===
Empty group

=== QI20AU Other live vaccines ===
Empty group

=== QI20AV Other inactivated vaccines ===
Empty group

=== QI20AX Other immunologicals ===
Empty group

== QI20B Reindeer ==
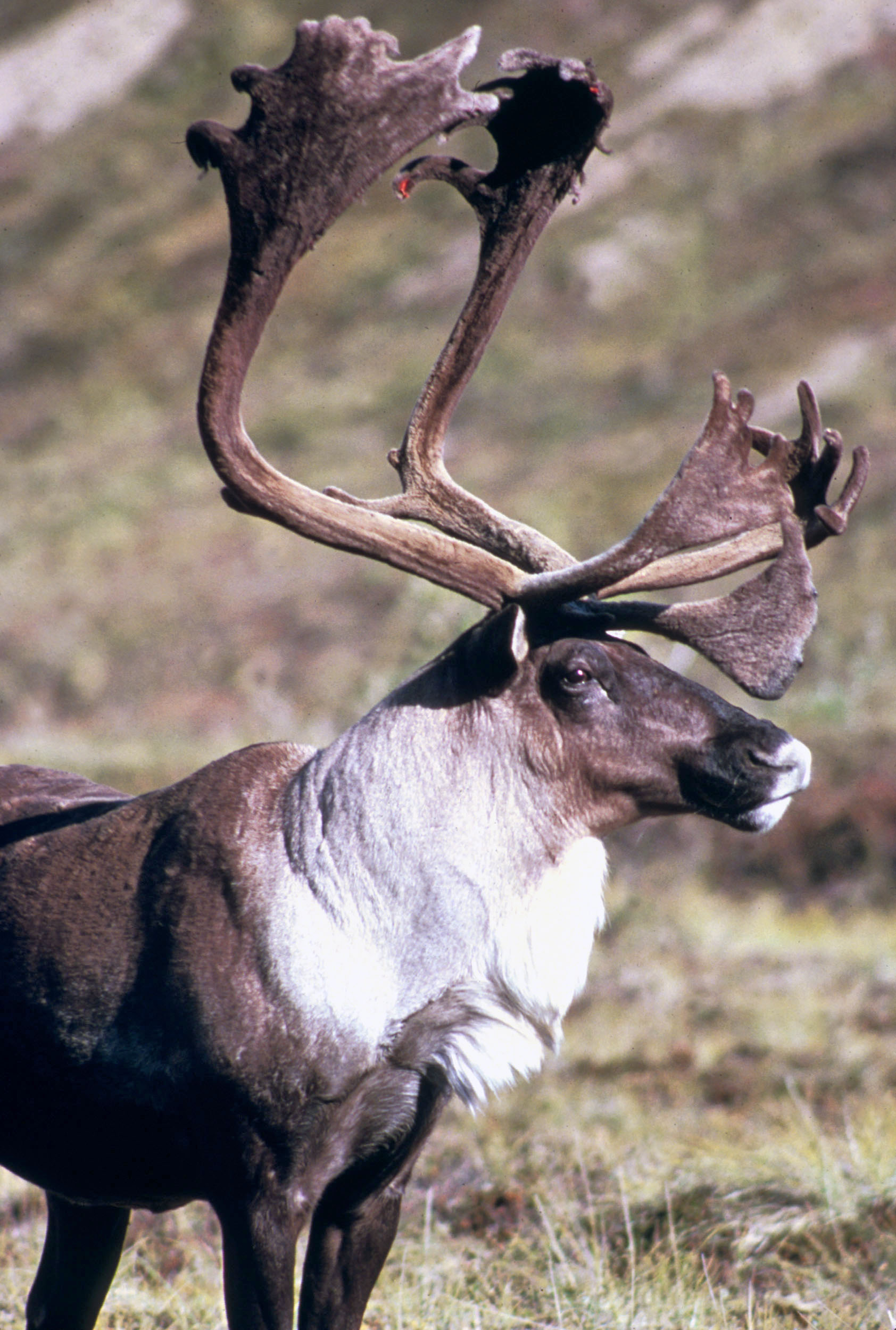

Empty group

== QI20C Mink ==
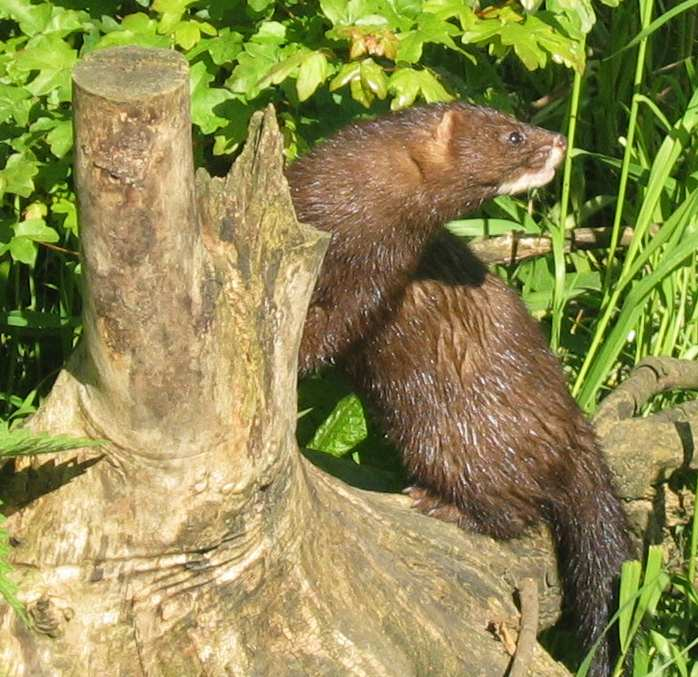

=== QI20CA Inactivated viral vaccines ===
QI20CA01 Mink enteritis virus

=== QI20CB Inactivated bacterial vaccines (including mycoplasma, toxoid and chlamydia) ===
QI20CB01 Clostridium

=== QI20CC Inactivated bacterial vaccines and antisera ===
Empty group

=== QI20CD Live viral vaccines ===
QI20CD01 Mink distemper virus

=== QI20CE Live bacterial vaccines ===
Empty group

=== QI20CF Live bacterial and viral vaccines ===
Empty group

=== QI20CG Live and inactivated bacterial vaccines ===
Empty group

=== QI20CH Live and inactivated viral vaccines ===
QI20CH01 Live mink distemper virus + inactivated mink enteritis virus

=== QI20CI Live viral and inactivated bacterial vaccines ===
Empty group

=== QI20CJ Live and inactivated viral and bacterial vaccines ===
QI20CJ01 Live mink distemper virus + inactivated mink enteritis virus/parvovirus + inactivated clostridium + inactivated pseudomonas

=== QI20CK Inactivated viral and live bacterial vaccines ===
Empty group

=== QI20CL Inactivated viral and inactivated bacterial vaccines ===
QI20CL01 Mink enteritis virus/parvovirus + inactivated clostridium + inactivated pseudomonas
QI20CL02 Mink enteritis virus/parvovirus + inactivated clostridium

=== QI20CM Antisera, immunoglobulin preparations, and antitoxins ===
Empty group

=== QI20CN Live parasitic vaccines ===
Empty group

=== QI20CO Inactivated parasitic vaccines ===
Empty group

=== QI20CP Live fungal vaccines ===
Empty group

=== QI20CQ Inactivated fungal vaccines ===
Empty group

=== QI20CR In vivo diagnostic preparations ===
Empty group

=== QI20CS Allergens ===
Empty group

=== QI20CT Colostrum preparations and substitutes ===
Empty group

=== QI20CU Other live vaccines ===
Empty group

=== QI20CV Other inactivated vaccines ===
Empty group

=== QI20CX Other immunologicals ===
Empty group

== QI20D Ferret ==
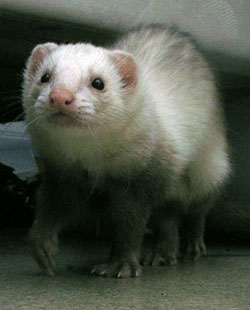

=== QI20DA Inactivated viral vaccines ===
Empty group

=== QI20DB Inactivated bacterial vaccines (including mycoplasma, toxoid and chlamydia) ===
Empty group

=== QI20DC Inactivated bacterial vaccines and antisera ===
Empty group

=== QI20DD Live viral vaccines ===
QI20DD01 Ferret distemper virus

=== QI20DE Live bacterial vaccines ===
Empty group

=== QI20DF Live bacterial and viral vaccines ===
Empty group

=== QI20DG Live and inactivated bacterial vaccines ===
Empty group

=== QI20DH Live and inactivated viral vaccines ===
Empty group

=== QI20DI Live viral and inactivated bacterial vaccines ===
Empty group

=== QI20DJ Live and inactivated viral and bacterial vaccines ===
Empty group

=== QI20DK Inactivated viral and live bacterial vaccines ===
Empty group

=== QI20DL Inactivated viral and inactivated bacterial vaccines ===
Empty group

=== QI20DM Antisera, immunoglobulin preparations, and antitoxins ===
Empty group

=== QI20DN Live parasitic vaccines ===
Empty group

=== QI20DO Inactivated parasitic vaccines ===
Empty group

=== QI20DP Live fungal vaccines ===
Empty group

=== QI20DQ Inactivated fungal vaccines ===
Empty group

=== QI20DR In vivo diagnostic preparations ===
Empty group

=== QI20DS Allergens ===
Empty group

=== QI20DT Colostrum preparations and substitutes ===
Empty group

=== QI20DU Other live vaccines ===
Empty group

=== QI20DV Other inactivated vaccines ===
Empty group

=== QI20DX Other immunologicals ===
Empty group

== QI20E Snake ==
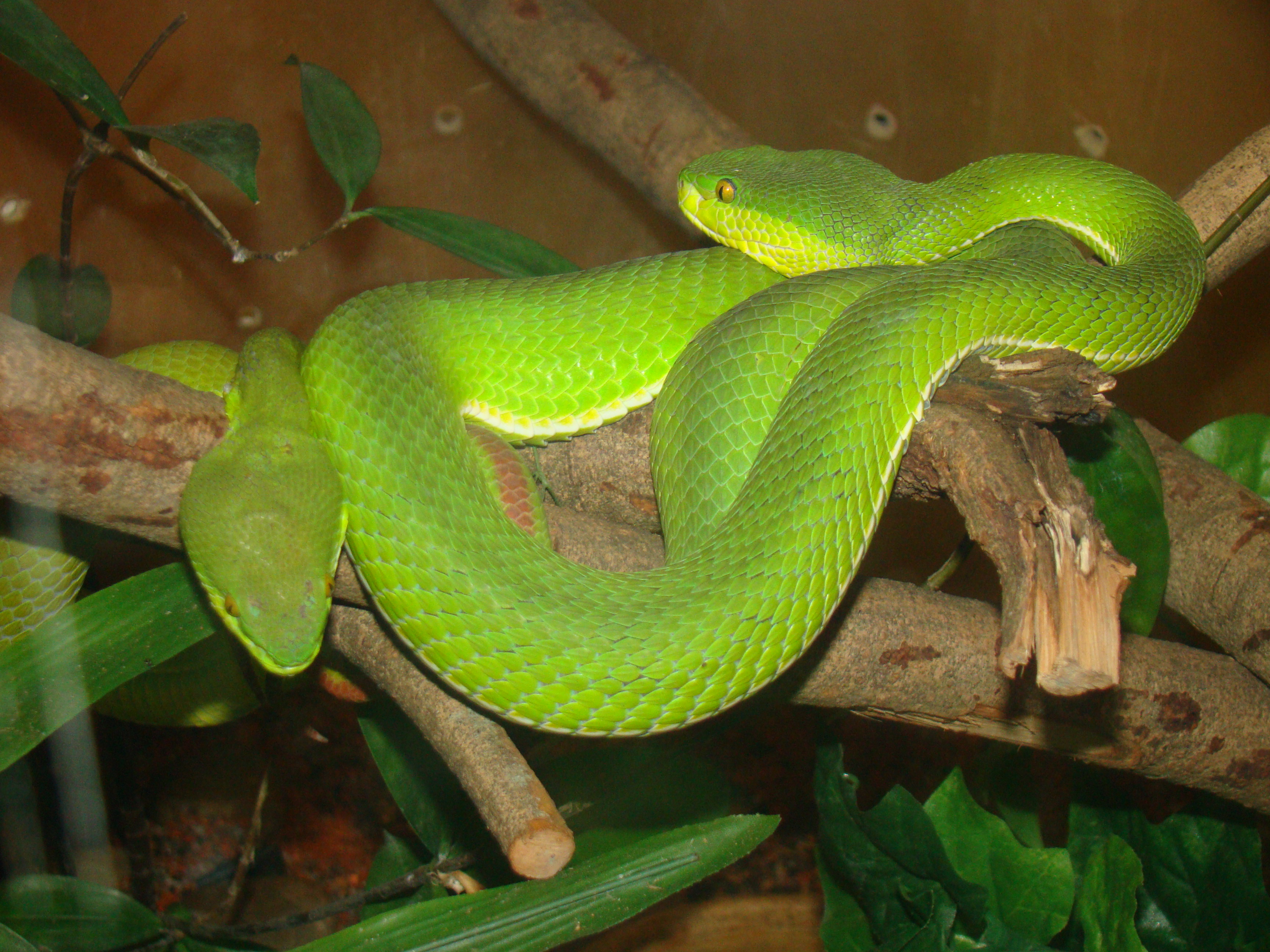

Empty group

== QI20F Bee ==
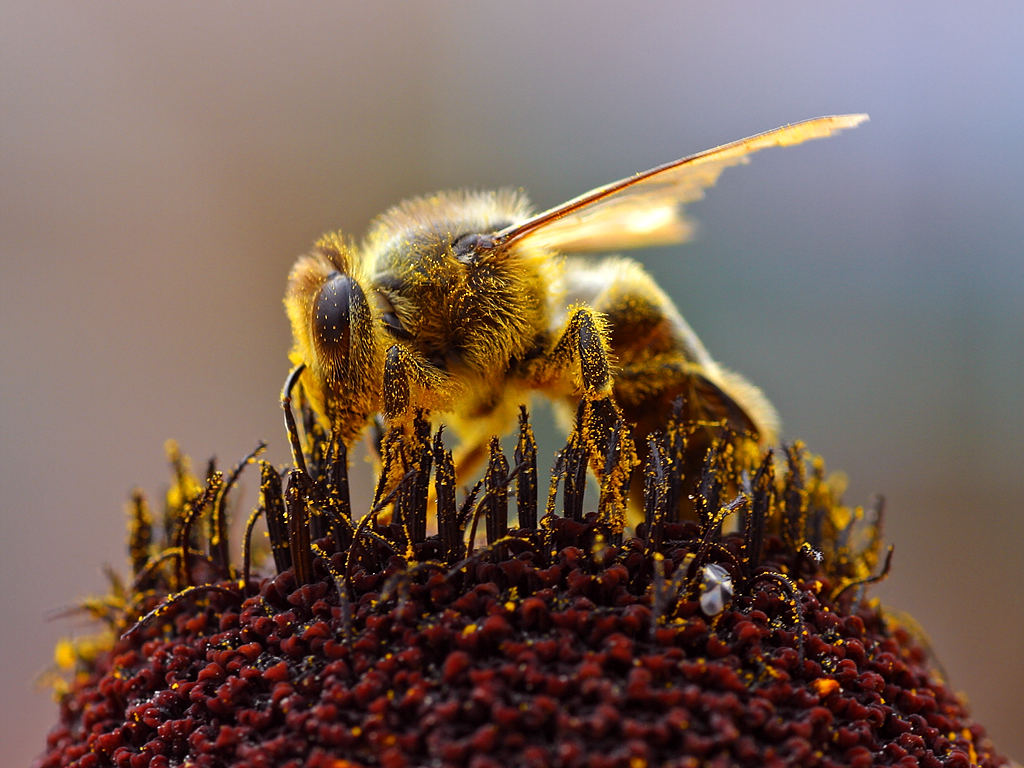

Empty group

== QI20X Others ==
=== QI20XE Live bacterial vaccines ===
QI20XE01 Mycobacterium
