= Patrick Laidlaw =

Scottish virologist

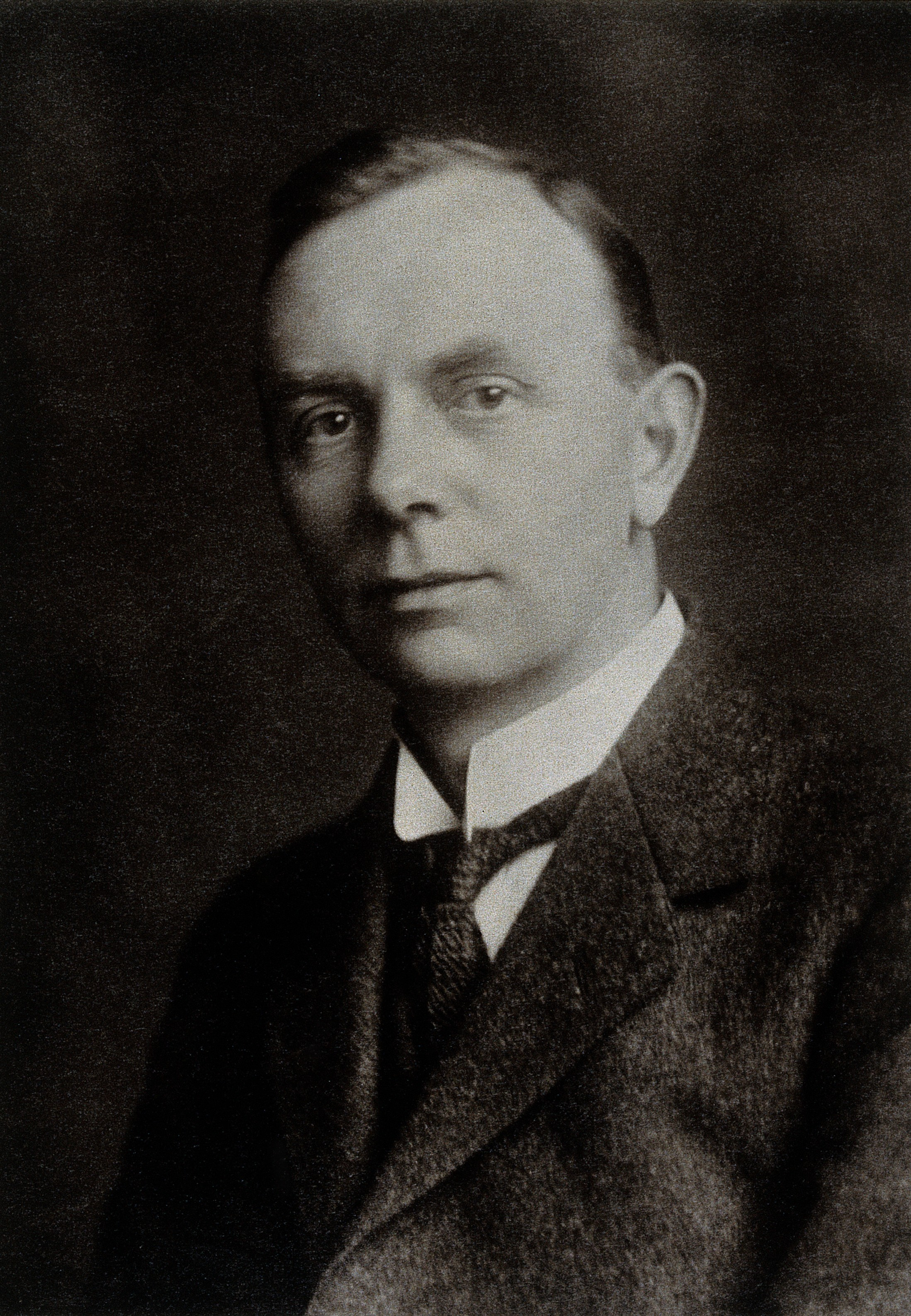
Patrick Playfair Laidlaw. Photograph

Sir Patrick Playfair Laidlaw FRS FRCP (26 September 1881 – 20 March 1940) was a Scottish virologist.

== Biography ==
Laidlaw was born in Glasgow, the son of Robert Laidlaw, M.D., at that time Superintendent of the Glasgow Medical Mission. He was educated at Leys School, Cambridge and St. John’s College, Cambridge.

Around 1910, he and Henry H. Dale studied the properties of histamine (then called β-imidazolylethylamine) at the Wellcome Physiological Research Laboratories after which he went to Guy's Hospital as a lecturer in experimental pathology. As a virologist at the Medical Research Council in 1922 his researches on dog-distemper led to two ways of immunisation against it, which achievement earned him the award of a Royal Medal by the Royal Society in 1933. In 1927 he had been elected a fellow of the Royal Society.

He was one of the scientists working at the Medical Research Council (NIMR Farm Laboratories) at Mill Hill who first isolated influenza virus from humans. This happened when ferrets they were working on to develop a distemper vaccine caught influenza from one of the scientists in the laboratory.

He was knighted in the 1935 Birthday Honours for distinguished service to medical science.

He died unmarried at the age of 58.
