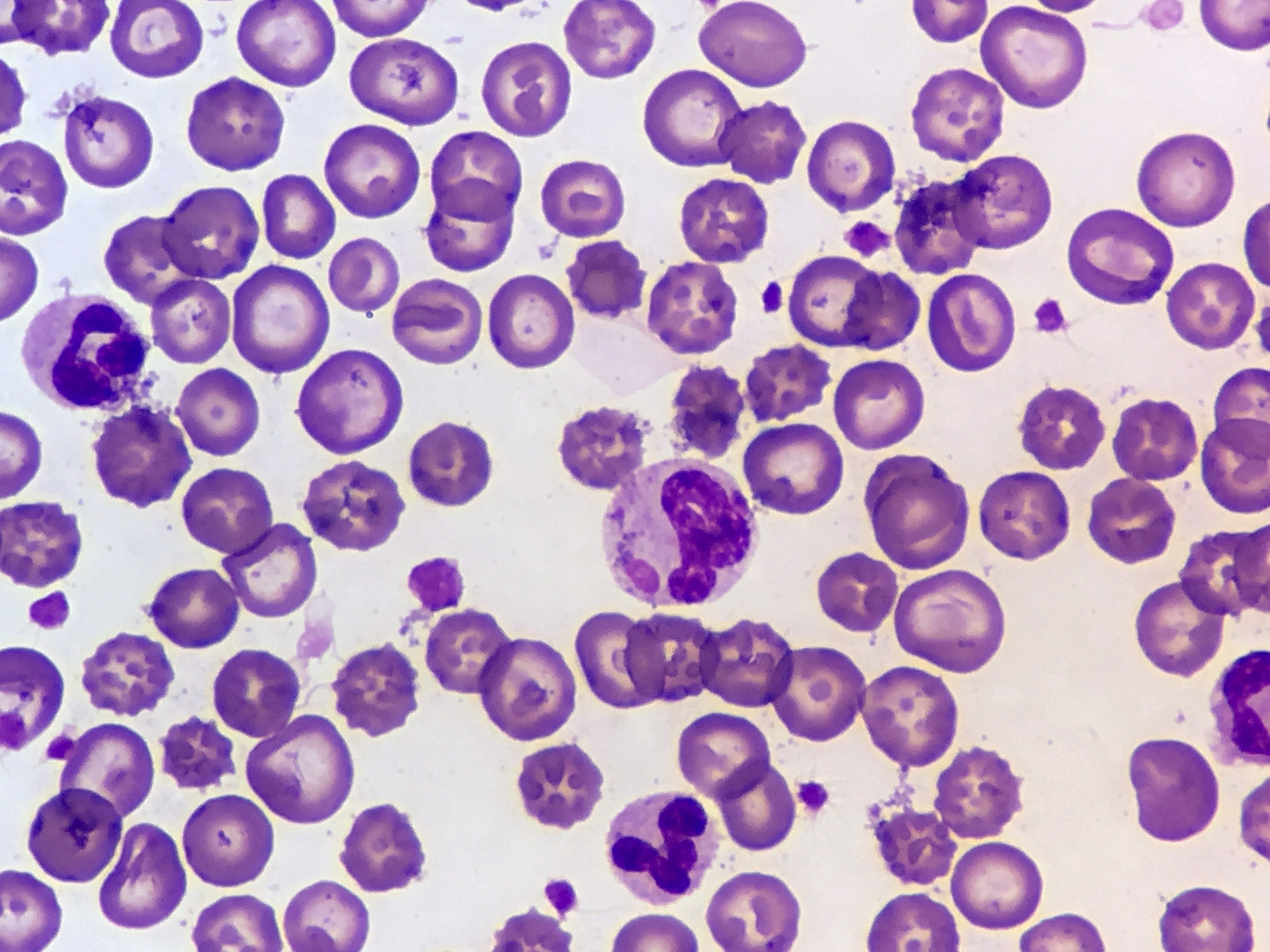
- Canine distemper virus cytoplasmic inclusion body (blood smear, Wright's stain)

Virus classification
- (unranked): Virus
- Realm: Riboviria
- Kingdom: Orthornavirae
- Phylum: Negarnaviricota
- Class: Monjiviricetes
- Order: Mononegavirales
- Family: Paramyxoviridae
- Genus: Morbillivirus
- Species: Morbillivirus canis

Synonyms
- Canine distemper virus

= Canine distemper =

Canine distemper virus

Viral disease affecting some mammals

Canine distemper (CDV) (sometimes termed "footpad disease") is a viral disease that affects a wide variety of mammal families, including domestic and wild species of dogs, coyotes, foxes, pandas, wolves, ferrets, skunks, raccoons, and felines, as well as pinnipeds, some primates, and a variety of other species. CDV does not affect humans.

In canines, CDV affects several body systems, including the gastrointestinal and respiratory tracts, the spinal cord, and the brain. Common symptoms include high fever, eye inflammation and eye/nose discharge, labored breathing and coughing, vomiting and diarrhea, loss of appetite and lethargy, and hardening of the nose and footpads. The viral infection can be accompanied by secondary bacterial infections and can eventually present serious neurological symptoms.

Canine distemper is caused by a single-stranded RNA virus of the family Paramyxoviridae (the same family of viruses that causes measles and mumps in humans). The disease is highly contagious via inhalation. Morbidity and mortality may vary greatly among animal species, with up to 100% mortality in unvaccinated populations of ferrets. In domestic dogs, while the acute generalized form of distemper has a high mortality rate, disease duration and severity depend mainly on the animal's age, immune status, and the virulence of the infecting strain of the virus. Despite extensive vaccination in many regions, it remains a major disease in dogs and was the leading cause of infectious disease death in dogs prior to a vaccine becoming available.

== Etymology ==
The origin of the word distemper is from Middle English distemperen, 'to upset the balance of the humors', which is from Old French destemprer, 'to disturb', which is from Vulgar Latin distemperare, 'to not mix properly'.

== History ==
In Europe, the first report of CDV occurred in Spain in 1761. Edward Jenner described the disease in 1809, and French veterinarian Henri Carré determined that the disease was caused by a virus in 1905. Carré's findings were disputed by researchers in England until 1926, when Patrick Laidlaw and G.W. Dunkin confirmed that the disease was, in fact, caused by a virus.

The first vaccine against canine distemper was developed by the Italian Vittorio Puntoni. In 1923 and 1924, Puntoni published two articles in which he added formalin to brain tissue from infected dogs to create a vaccine that successfully prevented the disease in healthy dogs. A commercial vaccine was developed in 1950, yet owing to its limited use, the virus remains prevalent in many populations.

The domestic dog has largely been responsible for introducing canine distemper to previously unexposed wildlife and now causes a serious conservation threat to many species of carnivores and some species of marsupials. The virus contributed to the near-extinction of the black-footed ferret. It also may have played a considerable role in the extinction of the thylacine (Tasmanian tiger) and recurrently causes mortality among African wild dogs. In 1993–1994, the lion population in the Serengeti, Tanzania, experienced a 20% decline as a result of the disease. In 2026, 72 captive tigers died from canine distemper at two nature parks in Chiang Mai Province, Thailand. The disease has also mutated into the phocine distemper virus, which affects seals.

== Clinical signs ==
In dogs, signs of CDV vary widely, from no signs to mild respiratory signs indistinguishable from kennel cough to severe pneumonia with vomiting, bloody diarrhea, and death.

Commonly observed signs are a runny nose, vomiting and diarrhea, dehydration, excessive salivation, coughing and/or labored breathing, loss of appetite, and weight loss. If neurological signs develop, incontinence may ensue. Central nervous system signs include a localized involuntary twitching of muscles or groups of muscles, seizures with salivation, and jaw movements commonly described as "chewing-gum fits," or more appropriately as "distemper myoclonus." As the condition progresses, the seizures worsen and progress to grand mal convulsions, followed by the death of the animal. The animal may also show signs of sensitivity to light, incoordination, circling, increased sensitivity to sensory stimuli such as pain or touch, and deterioration of motor capabilities. Less commonly, they may lead to blindness and paralysis. The length of the systemic disease may be as short as 10 days, or the start of neurological signs may not occur until several weeks or months later. Those few that survive usually have a small tic or twitch of varying degrees of severity. With time, this tic usually diminishes somewhat in its severity.

=== Lasting signs ===
A dog that survives distemper can have complications afterwards. The most prevalent complication is hard pad disease, in which the skin on paw pads and skin on end of the nose thicken. Another lasting symptom that is common is enamel hypoplasia. Puppies can have damage to the enamel of teeth that are not completely formed or have not yet grown through the gums. This results from the virus killing the cells responsible for manufacturing the tooth enamel. These affected teeth tend to erode quickly.

Italian wolf in advanced stage of infection.

Life-threatening complications can include nervous-system degeneration. Dogs that have been infected with distemper can have a progressive deterioration of mental abilities and motor skills. With time, the dog can develop seizures, paralysis, a reduction in sight, and incoordination. These dogs are usually humanely euthanized because of the immense pain and suffering they face.

== Virology ==
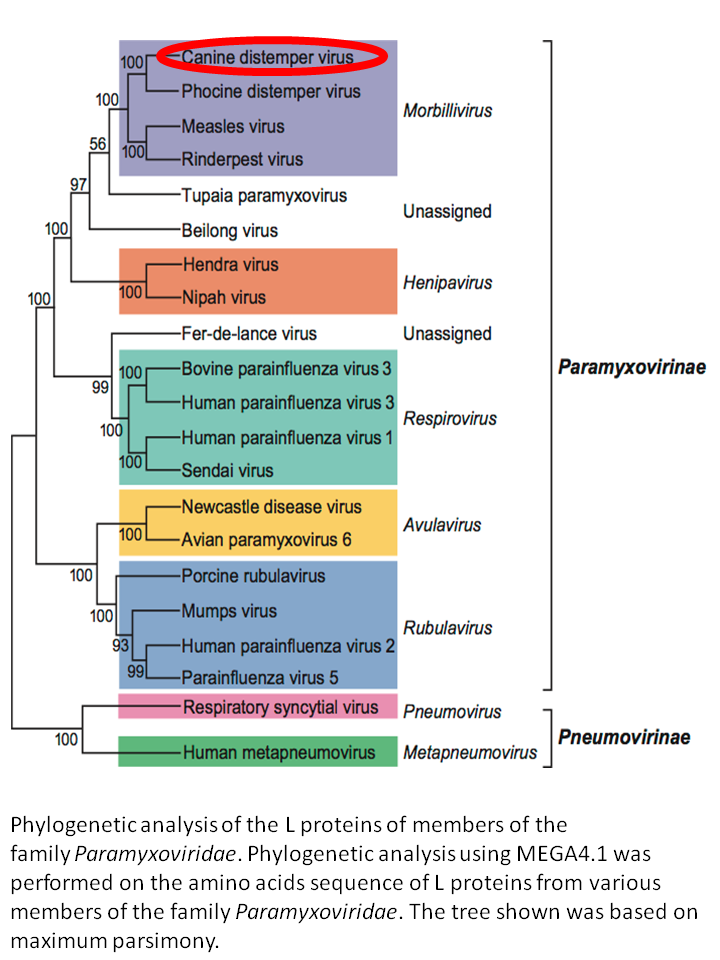
Canine distemper virus position in the phylogenetic tree of Paramyxoviruses

Distemper is caused by a single-stranded RNA virus of the family Paramyxoviridae, and is a very close relative of the viruses of the same genus that cause measles in humans and rinderpest in animals.

=== Genetic diversity ===
Geographically distinct lineages of the canine distemper virus are genetically diverse. This diversity arises from mutation and, when two genetically distinct viruses infect the same cell, from homologous recombination.

=== Host range ===
Distemper, or hardpad disease in canines, affects animals in the following families and species:

- Ailuridae (red panda)
- Canidae (dog, fox, wolf, Chinese raccoon dog)
- Elephantidae (Asian elephant)
- Felidae (large cats, though not domestic cats)
- Hyaenidae (hyena)
- Mephitidae (skunk)
- Mustelidae (ferret, mink, wolverine, marten, badger, otter)
- Pinnipedia (seals, walrus, sea lion, etc.)
- Primate (some; e.g. Japanese macaque, but not humans)
- Procyonidae (raccoon, coati)
- Ursidae (bear)
- Viverridae (raccoon-like South Asian binturong, palm civet)

Animals in the family Felidae, including many species of large cat as well as domestic cats, were long believed to be resistant to canine distemper until some researchers reported the prevalence of canine distemper virus (CDV) infection in large felids. Both large and domestic cats are now known to be capable of infection, usually through close housing with dogs or possibly blood transfusion from infected cats, but such infections appear to be self-limiting and largely without symptoms.

In a captive population of giant pandas in China (Shanxi Rare Wild Animal Rescue and Research Center), six of 22 captive pandas were infected by CDV. All but one infected panda died; the survivor had previously been vaccinated.

== Mechanism ==
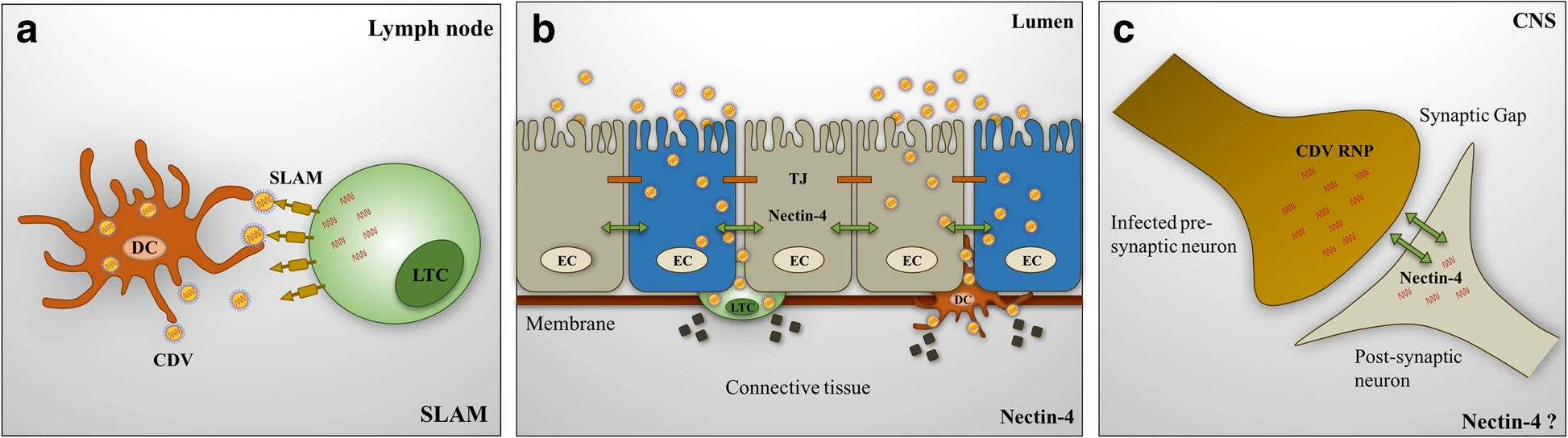
Principal routes of canine distemper virus (CDV) infection and transmission in hosts

The canine distemper virus affects nearly all body systems. Puppies from 3–6 months old are particularly susceptible. CDV spreads through aerosol droplets and through contact with infected bodily fluids, including nasal and ocular secretions, feces, and urine, 6 to 22 days after exposure. It can also be spread by food and water contaminated with these fluids. The time between infection and disease is 14 to 18 days, although a fever can appear from 3 to 6 days after infection.

The canine distemper virus tends to direct its infection toward the lymphoid, epithelial, and nervous tissues. The virus initially replicates in the lymphatic tissue of the respiratory tract. The virus then enters the blood stream and infects the respiratory, gastrointestinal, urogenital, epithelial, and central nervous systems, as well as optic nerves. Therefore, the typical pathologic features of canine distemper include lymphoid depletion (causing immunosuppression and leading to secondary infections), interstitial pneumonia, encephalitis with demyelination, and hyperkeratosis of the nose and foot pads.

The virus first appears in bronchial lymph nodes and tonsils two days after exposure. The virus then enters the bloodstream on the second or third day. A first round of acute fever tends to begin around 3–8 days after infection, which is often accompanied by a low white blood cell count, especially of lymphocytes, as well as a low platelet count. These signs may or may not be accompanied by anorexia, a runny nose, or discharge from the eye. This first round of fever typically recedes rapidly within 96 hours, and then a second round of fever begins around the 11th or 12th day and lasts at least a week. Gastrointestinal and respiratory problems tend to follow, which may become complicated with secondary bacterial infections. Inflammation of the brain and spinal cord, otherwise known as encephalomyelitis, either is associated with this, subsequently follows, or comes completely independently of these problems. A thickening of the footpads sometimes develops, and vesicular pustular lesions on the abdomen usually develop. Neurological signs are typically found in animals with thickened footpads from the virus. About half of sufferers experience meningoencephalitis. Less than 50% of the adult dogs that contract the disease die from it. Among puppies, the death rate often reaches 80%.

== Diagnosis ==
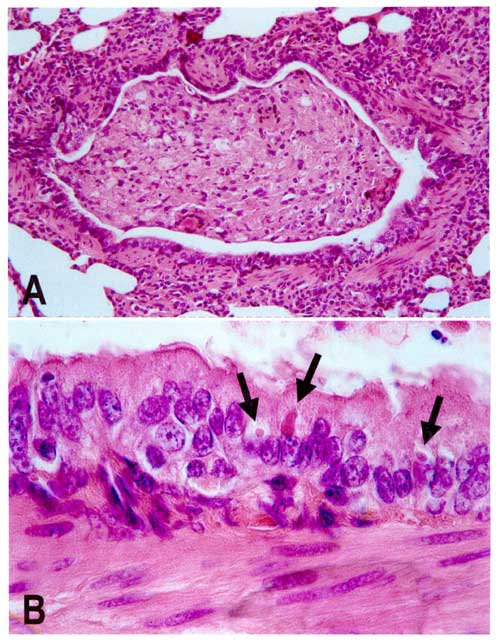
A. Lung lesion in an African wild dog B. Viral inclusion bodies

The above signs, especially fever, respiratory signs, neurological signs, and thickened footpads, occurring in unvaccinated dogs strongly indicate CDV. However, several febrile diseases match many of the signs of the disease and only recently has distinguishing between canine hepatitis, herpes virus, parainfluenza, and leptospirosis been possible. Thus, finding the virus by various methods in the dog's conjunctival cells or foot pads gives a definitive diagnosis. In older dogs that develop distemper encephalomyelitis, diagnosis may be more difficult, since many of these dogs have an adequate vaccination history.

An additional test to confirm distemper is a brush border slide of the bladder transitional epithelium of the inside lining from the bladder, stained with Diff-Quik. These infected cells have inclusions which stain a carmine red color, found in the paranuclear cytoplasm. About 90% of the bladder cells will be positive for inclusions in the early stages of distemper.

== Prevention ==
A number of vaccines against CDV exist for dogs (ATCvet code: QI07AD05 (WHO) and combinations) and domestic ferrets (QI20DD01 (WHO)), which in many jurisdictions are mandatory for pets. Infected animals should be quarantined from other dogs for several months owing to the length of time the animal may shed the virus. The virus is destroyed in the environment by routine cleaning with disinfectants, detergents, or drying. It does not survive in the environment for more than a few hours at room temperature (20–25 °C), but can survive for a few weeks in shady environments at temperatures slightly above freezing. It, along with other labile viruses, can also persist longer in serum and tissue debris.

Despite extensive vaccination in many regions, it remains a major disease of dogs.

To prevent canine distemper, puppies should begin vaccination at 6–8 weeks of age and then continue getting the "booster shot" every 2–4 weeks until they are 16 weeks of age. Without the full series of shots, the vaccination does not provide protection against the virus. Since puppies are typically sold at the age of 8–10 weeks, they typically receive the first shot while still with their breeder, but the new owner often does not finish the series. These dogs are not protected against the virus, so are susceptible to canine distemper infection, continuing the downward spiral that leads to outbreaks throughout the world.

== Treatment ==
No specific treatment for the CDV is known. As with measles, the treatment is symptomatic and supportive. Care is geared towards treating fluid/electrolyte imbalances, neurological symptoms, and preventing any secondary bacterial infections. Examples include administering fluids, electrolyte solutions, analgesics, anticonvulsants, broad-spectrum antibiotics, antipyretics, parenteral nutrition, and nursing care.

== Outcome ==
The mortality rate of CDV largely depends on the immune status of the infected dogs. Puppies experience the highest mortality rate, where complications such as pneumonia and encephalitis are more common. In older dogs that develop distemper, encephalomyelitis and vestibular disease may be present. Around 15% of canine inflammatory central nervous system diseases are a result of CDV.

== Epidemiology ==
The prevalence of canine distemper in the community has decreased dramatically due to the availability of vaccinations. However, the disease continues to spread among unvaccinated populations, such as those in animal shelters and pet stores. This provides a great threat to both the rural and urban communities throughout the United States, affecting both shelter and domestic canines. Despite the effectiveness of the vaccination, outbreaks of this disease continue to occur nationally. In April 2011, the Arizona Humane Society released a valley-wide pet health alert throughout Phoenix, Arizona.

Outbreaks of canine distemper continue to occur throughout the United States and elsewhere and are caused by many factors, including proximity to wild animals and lack of vaccinated animals. This problem is even greater within areas such as Arizona, owing to the vast amount of rural land. An unaccountable number of strays that lack vaccinations reside in these areas, so they are more susceptible to diseases such as canine distemper. These strays act as a reservoir for the virus, spreading it throughout the surrounding area, including urban areas. Puppies and dogs that have not received their shots can then be infected in a place where many dogs interact, such as a dog park.
