= HMS Bulolo =

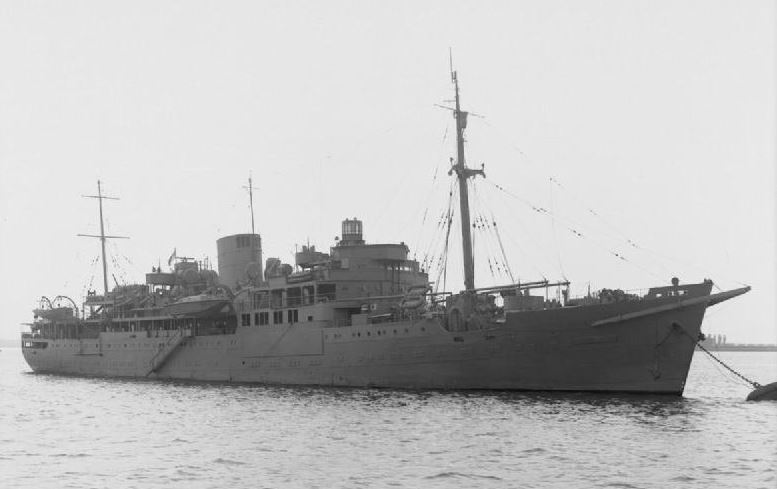

History

United Kingdom
- Name: MV Bulolo
- Owner: Burns, Philp Shipping Company
- Route: Mail service from Australia to Papua New Guinea
- Builder: Barclay, Curle & Company Limited (Glasgow, Scotland)
- Yard number: 668
- Launched: 31 May 1938
- Maiden voyage: 18 November 1938
- In service: 1938-39
- Fate: Requisitioned by Royal Navy September 1939

United Kingdom
- Name: HMS Bulolo
- Commissioned: 4 January 1940
- Decommissioned: 4 December 1946
- Refit: September 1938-January 1940 (Armed Merchant Cruiser); April–October 1942 (Headquarters ship)
- Identification: Pennant number: F82
- Honours and awards: Atlantic convoys 1940-42; Operation Torch 1943; Operation Shingle 1944; Normandy 1944

United Kingdom
- Name: MV Bulolo
- Owner: Burns, Philp Shipping Company
- In service: 1948-1968
- Fate: Scrapped 1968

General characteristics
- Tonnage: 6,267 GRT
- Length: 412 ft (126 m)
- Beam: 58 ft (18 m)
- Draught: 23 ft (7.0 m)
- Propulsion: Twin-screws driven by three B & W (Burmeister & Wain) diesel-electric engines
- Speed: 15 knots (28 km/h)
- Range: 9,300 nautical miles at 12 knots
- Boats & landing craft carried: 4 LCP(L)
- Armament: AMC; 7 × 152 mm guns; 2 × 12pdr guns; LSH; 1 × 152 mm gun; 1 × 12pdr gun; (4)2 2pdr quadruple mounts; 11 × 20mm Oerlikon single mounts

HMS Bulolo was a 6,267 ton passenger and cargo ship of the Burns, Philp Shipping Company operating in the South Pacific. In 1939 she was converted into an Armed Merchant Cruiser, then a Landing Ship Headquarters (LSH) in 1942. She directed the landings in North Africa, Sicily, Anzio and Normandy during World War II.

== Pre-WW II service ==
MV Bulolo was built for the Burns Philp line to be a passenger, cargo and mail steamer. She began her career on 19 November 1938 between Australia, Papua New Guinea, Solomon Islands, New Hebrides, Norfolk and Lord Howe Islands. She had completed eight voyages when war broke out in September 1939.

== World War II history ==
On 22 September 1939 the Bulolo was requisitioned by the British Ministry of War Transport on behalf of the Royal Navy from Burns, Philp & Company Limited, (based in Sydney, New South Wales). She spent October 1939 to January 1940 under conversion to an armed merchant cruiser with seven 6-inch guns, two 3-inch anti-aircraft guns, depth charges and smaller armaments.

On 24 January 1940 Bulolo sailed from Freetown acting as a convoy escort within the Freetown Convoy Escort Group. Over the next 27 months she was based almost exclusively in the Atlantic traveling between South America, South Africa and Britain carrying troops and supplies. Bulolo also searched for German surface raiders and in the capture of Vichy French ships.

On 25 March 1942 the Bulolo was sold to the Admiralty and from 4 April 1942 to October 1942 she was converted to an amphibious Landing Ship Headquarters ship. During this refit she had a sophisticated communications systems installed for use in army, navy and air force control purposes. Her armament was sharply reduced as well.

Bulolo then headed to North Africa as the flagship of Admiral Sir Harold M. Burrough, Commander of the Eastern Naval Task Force to take part in Operation Torch (the invasion of North Africa) and entered Algiers Harbour on 9 November 1942, the day after its surrender. A near miss from a German bomber attack the day before had damaged the engine room telegraph, unbeknownst to the crew. As the ship entered the port at 12 knots, the order for full steam astern went unheeded in the engine room and the ship ran aground, demolished a portion of the seawall and hit a waterfront building before settling back into the harbor. The French officials at the port to welcome the ship first scattered, then applauded the ship’s unconventional arrival. She then took part in Operation Husky (the invasion of Sicily) as the flagship of Rear Admiral Thomas Troubridge in charge of 'Force A' commanding the British XIII Corps (at the Gulf of Noto) between July and August 1943, and then as flagship commanding 'Task Force Peter' embarking the British 1st Division during Operation Shingle, the landings at Anzio in January 1944. The Bulolo then returned to Britain in April 1944 in readiness for Operation Overlord, the Allied landings being planned for Normandy in June 1944.

On 28 April 1944, Commodore Douglas-Pennant, Naval Commander of Force "G", hoisted his flag on HMS Bulolo. Thereafter the Bulolo commenced training for D-Day. On 6 June 1944, Bulolo commanded the landing on Gold Beach, and though she was forced to relocate after receiving incoming fire from the German battery at Longues-sur-Mer, she remained off the beaches directing the assault. On 27 June she returned to Portsmouth.

Following another refit, the Bulolo was sent in 1945 to be the Headquarters Ship and flagship of Rear Admiral Benjamin Martin for 'Force W' off Malaya commanding the Allies retaking of South East Asia from Japanese forces. In September 1945, Bulolo was used to accept the Japanese surrender at Singapore.

== Post-World War II career ==
On 4 December 1946 she was decommissioned and returned to the Burns, Philp Shipping Company in 1948 to resume her merchant duties. After 161 round voyages, she was sold to the China Steel Corporation and scrapped at Kaohsiung, Taiwan in May 1968.

== Bibliography ==
- Holtham, Tony (May 2022). "HMS Bulolo". Marine News Supplement: Warships. 76 (5): S283–S299. ISSN 0966-6958.
