= Frank Sturdy Sinnatt =

British fuel engineer (1880–1943)

- Born: 4 May 1880
- Died: 27 January 1943 (aged 62)
- Engineering career
- Discipline: fuel engineering

Frank Sturdy Sinnatt CB FRS (4 May 1880 – 27 January 1943) was a British fuel engineer.

== Biography ==
Sinnatt was born on 4 May 1880 in St. Helier in Jersey, eldest of two brothers and a sister. His father was a journalist, Francis Sinnatt and his mother Sarah Sturdy, from a family of textile manufacturers in Lancashire. The family moved to Manchester when Sinnatt was still a child. There he attended the Central High School and gained a scholarship to enter the Manchester School of Technology in 1897 to study Chemistry. In 1900 he became a demonstrator in Organic Chemistry before being appointed Assistant Lecturer in Applied Chemistry.

Quickly, Sinnatt focussed on the study of coal as a technology. He briefly served with the Special Brigade, in France, in 1915 but returned home injured. By 1918, he set up the Lancashire and Cheshire Coal Research Association, becoming its first director. In 1924, he was appointed Director of Fuel Research at the Department of Scientific and Industrial Research, and went on to be Director in 1931. He supported the project to measure Britain's coal resources (The Coal Survey), becoming its Superintendent in 1924. In addition to his work on establishing the Coal Survey he was still heavily involved with the work of the Fuel Research Station at Greenwich. Around this time, he married his wife, Louise Midgley Badger.

He was made a CB in the 1935 Birthday Honours. He was elected a Foreign Member of the Royal Swedish Academy of Engineering Sciences in 1935 and a Fellow of the Royal Society in 1938. He died of bronchitis in 1943 in Greenwich.
