= Benjamin Martin (Royal Navy officer) =

Vice-Admiral Sir Benjamin Martin KBE DSO
- Born: 18 July 1891; Isle of Wight, Hampshire, England
- Died: 3 June 1957 (aged 65); Natal, South Africa
- Military career
- Allegiance: United Kingdom
- Branch: Royal Navy
- Service years: 1907–1944
- Rank: Vice-Admiral
- Commands: HMS Dorsetshire; HMS Bulolo
- Conflicts: World War I World War II
- Awards: Knight Commander of the Order of the British Empire; Distinguished Service Order

Vice-Admiral Sir Benjamin Charles Stanley Martin KBE DSO (18 July 1891 – 3 June 1957) was a Royal Navy officer who was the first boy from the Royal Naval Hospital School, Greenwich, to reach flag rank in the Royal Navy. He was also the first officer from the lower deck to become a rear admiral on the active list in modern times and only the second, after Sir Thomas Spence Lyne, to achieve flag rank at all in the same period.

== Naval career ==
Martin was born on 18 July 1891 to Benjamin S. Martin and Alice (née Gawn). His father, a Petty Officer (1st class), was killed during the accidental sinking of HMS Victoria on 22 June 1893. He attended the Royal Naval Hospital School in Greenwich, graduating into the Royal Navy in 1907 as boy sailor, first class. Promoted to warrant rank as gunner (torpedo) on 28 May 1915, the following year he served at the Battle of Jutland in HMS Malaya in the 5th Battle Squadron under Rear-Admiral Hugh Evan-Thomas.

On 13 October 1916, Martin was commissioned as Mate, and following a short transfer to a destroyer he returned to Malaya. After promotion to lieutenant on 13 May 1919, Martin served as torpedo officer in the cruisers HMS Leviathan and HMS Kent. In 1924, Martin was given his first command on HMS Sable, attached to HMS Vernon, the Royal Navy torpedo school in Portsmouth.

Later Martin commanded the destroyers HMS Venetia and HMS Vortigern. Following his promotion to commander on 30 June 1931, Martin take charge of HMS Voyager as a division leader in the 1st Destroyer Flotilla in the Mediterranean. With promotion to the rank of captain on 30 June 1935, Martin commanded the sloop HMS Folkestone on the China Station. Two years later, Martin was in command of HMS Broke and the destroyer flotillas of the Reserve Fleet during the Coronation Naval Review (in 1937). After a spell at the Admiralty, Martin took command of the cruiser HMS Dorsetshire.

== Sinking of Bismarck ==
As captain of Dorsetshire, Martin on 24 May 1941 whilst on convoy escort duties off Sierra Leone handed over responsibility for the convoy SL7 to the armed merchant cruiser HMS Bulolo WITHOUT authorisation from the British admiralty in order to assist in the operations against the German battleship Bismarck. On the way north to intercept Bismarck, Martin addressed the crew of Dorsetshire, and informed them that if necessary he was prepared to ram Bismarck if he was the last ship able to intercept the German battleship to prevent it from reaching the safety of the French ports. After intercepting the damaged Bismarck, Dorsetshire was ordered By Adm Tovey to attack the German battleship with torpedoes, which helped sink the battleship on 27 May. Martin was awarded a Distinguished Service Order for his actions.

In 1942 Martin was appointed Commodore in Charge at Durban, and received a CBE in the 1944 New Year honours. With his promotion to rear admiral on 7 July 1944, Martin became the first officer in 87 years to reach active flag rank having started on the lower decks. Shortly afterwards he was given command of the landing force aboard HMS Bulolo of the Eastern Fleet in 1945.

Martin retired from the Royal Navy and in recognition of his service he was awarded a KBE in June 1946. He was promoted to vice admiral on the retired list on 2 September 1948.

== Awards and honours ==
- Mention in Despatches, Captain Benjamin Charles Stanley Martin, Royal Navy, 1 January 1941.
- To be Companions of the Distinguished Service Order: Captain Benjamin Charles Stanley Martin, Royal Navy, H.M.S. Dorsetshire.

His Majesty has also been graciously pleased to give orders for the following Appointments to the Distinguished Service Order, and to approve the following Awards for mastery, determination and skill in action against the German Battleship Bismarck.

- To be Additional Knights Commanders of the Military Division of the said Most Excellent Order, Rear-Admiral Benjamin Charles Stanley Martin, C.B.E., D.S.O, 7 June 1946.

The King has been graciously pleased to give orders for the following promotions in, and appointments to, the Most Excellent Order of the British Empire, 'for distinguished services during the war in the Far East'.
