= Thomas Lyne =

Royal Navy officer (1869–1955)

Rear-Admiral Sir Thomas Lyne KCVO CB DSO
- Born: 25 September 1869; Cromarty, Scotland
- Died: 25 December 1955 (aged 86) England
- Allegiance: United Kingdom
- Branch: Royal Navy
- Service years: 1884–1925
- Rank: Rear-admiral
- Commands: HM TB.60; HMS Traveller; HMS Snipe; HM TB.11; HMS Kinsha; HMS Sharpshooter; HMS Ringdove; HMS Assistance; HMS Indus; HMS Blenheim; HMS Impregnable
- Conflicts: Second Boer War

Rear-Admiral Sir Thomas John Spence Lyne, KCVO, CB, DSO (25 September 1869 – 25 December 1955) was a Royal Navy officer. Lyne had the distinction of being the first man in half a century to rise from the lower deck to the rank of captain on the active list and to achieve flag rank, albeit on the retired list.

Lyne was the son of a Royal Navy sailor, William John Lyne, and of Janet Lyne, née Reid, daughter of Colin Reid, of Cromarty. Educated at Beers Private School, Stoke Damerel, Devon, he joined the Royal Navy as a boy in 1885, aged 14. After leaving the training ship HMS Impregnable at Devonport, he went to sea in HMS Agincourt, the flagship of the Channel Fleet. After a series of early promotions through the lower deck ratings, he reached warrant rank on 16 February 1898, when he was promoted to gunner.

On 25 August 1925, Lyne was appointed a CB and was retired the same day upon reaching the retirement age. In 1931, Lyne was promoted to rear-admiral on the retired list, the first man to achieve flag rank from the lower deck in almost a century. Sir John Kingcome, promoted to flag rank in 1857, is often cited as the last such case, but there is doubt as to whether he actually belonged to the lower deck. In any case, no man from the lower deck would reach flag rank again in the Royal Navy until 1944, when Benjamin Charles Stanley Martin was promoted to rear-admiral on the active list. In 1935, he was appointed KCVO by George V.
