= Charles Johnston Smith =

British senior surgeon (1880-1943)

Charles Johnston Smith OBE CBE
- Born: 1880; Edinburgh
- Died: 25 January 1943 (aged 62)
- Education: Edinburgh University
- Occupation: Senior surgeon
- Years active: 1911-1942
- Children: 2 daughters

Charles Johnston Smith OBE CBE (1880 – 25 January 1943) was a British surgeon who served as Senior Surgeon, Singapore from 1918 to 1935.

== Early life and education ==
Smith was born in Edinburgh in 1880, the son of E. Johnston Smith. He was educated at Royal High School, Edinburgh and Edinburgh University where he received his medical degree and Bachelor of Surgery (MBChB) in 1904. After further training, in 1909, he became a Fellow of the Royal College of Surgeons (FRCS).

== Career ==
In 1911, he entered the Malayan Civil Service as a House Surgeon and was posted to Seremban. In 1914, he went to Singapore as professor of clinical surgery. From 1918 to 1935, he was Senior Surgeon, Singapore, and from 1925 to 1935, he was also Senior Professor of Surgery at King Edward VII College of Medicine. Described in his later years as "perhaps the most brilliant surgeon who ever worked in Malaya", some of his successful operations were reported in the press. In 1935, he retired from the Malayan Medical Service.

After moving to the Channel Islands, he became a consulting surgeon at the Victoria Hospital, Guernsey, and from 1941–42, he served as surgeon at Clare Hall Manor, E.M.S. Hospital, Hertfordshire, treating people from London injured in air raids.

== Personal life and death ==
Smith married Kathleen Scott in 1921, and they had two daughters.

Smith died on 25 January 1943.

== Honours ==
Smith was appointed Member of the Order of the British Empire (MBE) in 1930, and Commander of the Order of the British Empire (CBE) in 1935.
