= Noel Ashbridge =

English engineer (1889–1975)

Ashbridge in December 1947.

Sir Noel Ashbridge KBE (10 December 1889 – 4 June 1975) was an English engineer who played a key role in the early technical development of the British Broadcasting Corporation.

== Early life and education ==
Ashbridge was born in 1889 in Wanstead, Essex, the youngest son of Sylvia (née Moore) and John Ashbridge, a solicitor. He was educated at Forest School in East London, before studying for a Bachelor of Science degree in engineering at King's College London, graduating in 1911.

== Career ==
After graduating, Ashbridge undertook further training with shipbuilders Yarrow & Company, engineering firm British Thomson-Houston and the Lancashire Dynamo and Motor Company. In 1914, he joined the Royal Fusiliers, moving to the Royal Engineers two years later.

After the war, Ashbridge was employed by the Marconi Company. His involvement in developing the 2MT transmitter led to him acquiring a job as assistant chief engineer at the BBC from January 1926, under his Marconi colleague Peter Eckersley. After three years, he took over from Eckersley as chief engineer.

In the following years, he played a key role in the development of the engineering side of the BBC, and also offered technical advice to other European countries. For his work, the Danish monarch made him a Knight of the Order of the Dannebrog in 1934, and he was knighted in the United Kingdom in 1935. He was later part of a wartime committee set up to plan for post-war resumption of television broadcasting.

In 1943, he became deputy director-general of the BBC. In 1948, due to restructuring within the corporation, he became director of technical services. In 1950, he was involved in the foundation of the European Broadcasting Union. He retired from the BBC two years later. After retiring, Ashbridge served on the board of Marconi for seven years.

== Personal life ==
Ashbridge married Olive Maud Strickland on 17 July 1926. They had two daughters, Wendy and Helen. Maud died in 1948. His interests outside of engineering included cricket and sailing. He died at a nursing home in Speldhurst, Kent in June 1975, aged 85. He was survived by his two daughters.
