= Officer Corps of the Royal Navy =

The officer corps of the Royal Navy is the cadre of personnel holding a commission from the sovereign appointing them in a position of authority in the Royal Navy.

== Recruiting and training ==
There are three main routes of entry to the officer corps; direct entry, professional entry and the upper yardman scheme.

Direct entrants are recruited as civilians and undertake a full course of training to become employable.

Professional entrants are individuals who have qualified professionally in the civilian environment and their employment in the Royal Navy will use these qualifications. These are doctors, dentists, nursing officers and chaplains.

The upper yardman scheme allows for ratings identified as potential officers to be selected for commissioning training and operates in two ways. An upper yardman under 30 years of age will join a direct entry class, undertakes the same training path and is otherwise treated as a direct entrant. Candidates for upper yardman can transfer to any specialisation in the officer corps.

The senior upper yardman scheme allows for very experienced ratings identified as potential specialist officers to be commissioned. Candidates for the senior upper yardman scheme will be over 35 years of age and undertake a short training period at Dartmouth before being employed within the same specialisation as their rating career.

Initial officer training is undertaken at Britannia Royal Naval College, Dartmouth and at sea undergoing initial sea training. Junior officers are appointed to seagoing ships for common and specialist fleet time and will then undertake specialist training as appropriate to their branch.

== Specialisation ==
Officers enter the service in one of the available branches; logistics, engineer, warfare, medical, and with each of these are a range of sub-specialisations. Entry into a sub-specialisation may define career direction or may only be for a short period.

There is a general view of a two stage career where one is employed in predominantly operational roles in the early stage of a career, and then predominantly strategic management in the later stage.

=== Warfare ===
Specialist fleet training for junior warfare officers concentrates on shiphandling, seamanship and bridge watchkeeping. The initial warfare officers' (IWO) course is undertaken at the Maritime Warfare School leading to a first complement job in a surface ship. Junior submarine warfare officers undertake training at the Submarine School at HMS Raleigh in Torpoint before being appointed to a complement job in a submarine. The junior warfare officer is responsible for navigation and bridge watchkeeping, where they will ensure the navigational safety of all ship operations on behalf of the captain.

Following the first complement job a junior officer may be further employed in bridge watchkeeping duties in ships or submarines or may sub-specialise. The available sub-specialisations include mine clearance diving, hydrography and meteorology, fighter control, frigate navigation or submarine warfare with some of these earning a notification in the Navy List.

Career development leads to the principal warfare officer, advanced submarine warfare or advance hydrography and meteorology training. The principal warfare officer will fight the ship on behalf of the captain, deciding what targets to engage and in what order; directing the naval ratings in their operation of weapons and sensors. With experience as a principal warfare officer further development increases the individuals specialisation and employability.

Aviators of the warfare branch directly specialise in aviation after commissioning, undertaking a bespoke academics package and working in the Fleet Air Arm either as aircrew or air traffic control officers. There are career opportunities later on for aviators to undertake principal warfare officer training.

The warfare branch also acts as the nominal branch for specialist officers commissioned in the senior upper yardman scheme who are not in the logistics or engineer branches. These senior upper yardman officers need not qualify as watchkeepers however will not be considered for sea command if they have not. This category includes physical trainers, naval police officers and aviation officers.

=== Engineer ===
Engineer officers are responsible for the material condition of the various aspects of maritime platforms: ships, submarines and naval aircraft and as such lead teams of naval ratings to conduct preventive and corrective maintenance. Engineer officers are responsible to the captain for the operational capability of the platform and as such form part of the command team. Engineers are also widely employed in the Defence Equipment and Support engaged in logistic support, procurement or capability development and in the UK Ministry of Defence, supporting the fleet or other elements of the British Armed Forces.

Engineer officers specialise in one of four sub-branches that serve as a career alignment throughout their career; weapon systems, marine systems, aviation engineering and training management.

=== Logistics ===
Logistics officers are responsible for supply, catering, administration, financial, personnel and legal services and officers can undertake deep training in any of these fields.

== Exercise of military command ==
Commissioned officers hold powers of military command however only those officers of the warfare branch who are appropriately qualified can be appointed to sea command.
