= Ernest Henry Wreford =

Australian banker (1866–1938)

Sir Ernest Henry Wreford (17 December 1866 – 10 May 1938) was an Australian banker.

== Early life ==
Wreford was born on 17 December 1866 in Adelaide, South Australia, the son of draper Henry Wreford and his wife Eliza (née Franklin). He attended North Adelaide Grammar School but began working at the National Bank of Australasia in Adelaide in 1882 after realising that he could not study either law or literature.

== Career ==
From 1896 to 1906, Wreford served as the manager of the Western Australian goldfields in Coolgardie. He was then posted to the bank's London branch as secretary, eventually becoming chief manager from 1912 to 1935 and director immediately upon his retirement in April 1935. The bank's standing prospered during his tenure, which coincided with its mergers with banks including the Colonial Bank of Australia in 1918 and the Bank of Queensland in 1920. At the bank, Wreford earned himself the nickname of "The Chief". However, Wreford was not well-liked by all of his subordinates. He received a knighthood in the same year. Wreford was also a member of the Melbourne Chamber of Commerce and the Royal Colonial Institute.

== Personal life and death ==
On 13 August 1903, Wreford married Louisa Nellie Estelle Fraser at St George's Anglican Cathedral in Perth. They had two sons and three daughters. He died on 10 May 1938 at Mount Eliza, Victoria. The National Australia Bank in Melbourne possesses a portrait of Wreford by W. B. McInnes.

== See also ==
- Sir Alfred Charles Davidson
- William Beckwith McInnes
