= Sub-lieutenant =

Naval officer, NATO rank OF-1

Sub-lieutenant is usually a junior officer rank, used in armies, navies and air forces.

In most armies, sub-lieutenant is the lowest commissioned officer rank. However, in Brazil, it is the highest non-commissioned rank, and in Spain, it is the second highest non-commissioned rank.

As a naval rank, a sub-lieutenant ranks below a lieutenant.

== Army and air force rank ==
In France, a sub-lieutenant (sous-lieutenant) is the junior commissioned officer in the army or the air force. He wears a band in the colour of his corps (e.g. gold for infantry, silver for armoured cavalry, etc.). During the 18th century, a rank of sous-lieutenant de vaisseau existed in the French Navy. It was the equivalent of the master's mate rank of the Royal Navy. It is now replaced by the rank of "first ensign" (enseigne de vaisseau de première classe).

An Argentinian sub-lieutenant wears a single silver sun on each shoulder, Brazilian sub-lieutenants are the most senior non-commissioned rank (called Sub-Officer in the Navy and Air force), wearing a golden lozenge. In Mexico, the sub-lieutenant is the most junior officer in the rank scale, and wears a single gold bar. Thai sub-lieutenants and acting sub-lieutenants wear a single star on each shoulder.

The British Army briefly used the rank of sub-lieutenant from 1871 to 1877, replacing the ranks of ensign in the infantry and cornet in the cavalry. In 1877, it was replaced in turn by the rank of second lieutenant, although this had always been used by the Royal Artillery, Royal Engineers, and rifle and fusilier regiments.

Turkish Armed Forces designates sub-lieutenant as 1) the senior students in military academy and 2) a conscript who possesses university or other higher education diploma, that got drafted for a 1-year service.

=== Army insignia ===
Sous lieutenant
(Arabic: ملازم, romanized: Mulazim)
(Algerian Land Forces)

Sub-tenente
(Angolan Army)

Sous-lieutenant
(Benin Army)

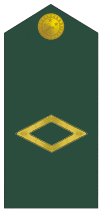
Sub-tenente (Brazilian Army)

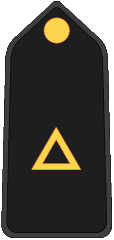
Sub-tenente (Brazilian Military Police and Military Firefighters Corps)

Sublocotenent (Romanian Land Forces)

Sublocotenent (Romanian Gendarmerie)

Asteğmen (Turkish Land Forces)

=== Air force insignia ===
Sub-tenente
(National Air Force of Angola)

Sublocotenent (Romanian Air Force)

Asteğmen (Turkish Air Force)

== Naval rank ==
=== History of naval rank ===
In the British Royal Navy, a passed midshipman awaiting promotion often elected to become a master's mate, normally an experienced petty officer who assisted the sailing master. Though formally the rating did not lead to promotion to lieutenant, master's mates were paid more than any other rating and were the only ratings allowed to command any sort of vessel. A midshipman who became a master's mate got an increase in pay from £1 13s 6d to £3 16s per month, but initially reduced his chances at a commission. Over time, however, service as a master's mate became a normal part of the path to a commission. The situation caused some confusion during the last part of the 18th century, when two parallel roles—master's mates trying to become masters, and former midshipmen working toward a commission—held the same title and responsibilities aboard ship.

By the first years of the 19th century, the prefix "master's" was dropped for passed midshipmen, to distinguish them from master's mates in the navigator's branch. In 1824 two further grades were also introduced, consisting of master's assistants and second-class volunteers. These corresponded to midshipmen and first-class volunteers respectively in the executive line. From this point, passed midshipmen had the rating master's mate, abbreviated as mate, and prospective masters had the rating master's assistant. These changes helped eliminate the confusion caused by the mingling of midshipmen in the navigator's branch.

In 1861 the rank of mate was renamed sub-lieutenant.

=== Modern practice ===
In the modern Royal Navy, all officer cadets now commission as midshipmen, regardless of whether they are a graduate or a school leaver. They are subsequently promoted to sub-lieutenant one year after entering Britannia Royal Naval College. Upper yardsmen commission as sub-lieutenants assuming their seniority date is greater than 12 months.

In the Royal Canadian Navy, all undergoing basic officer training join as naval cadets, but upon graduation, those who joined with a bachelor's degree receive an immediate promotion to acting sub-lieutenant, while those who do not retain their rank as naval cadet until such time as they finish more career-related training.

=== Use ===
In the Royal Navy, the Royal Australian Navy and the Royal New Zealand Navy, the insignia of both sub-lieutenants and acting sub-lieutenants consists of one medium gold braid stripe with an executive curl. The size of this stripe should not be confused with the narrow stripe, colloquially referred to as "spaghetti strap", used on the Royal New Zealand Navy rank of ensign and the Royal Canadian Navy's naval cadets. The Royal Air Force also followed this example of braiding when developing their rank system (see flying officer).

The insignia of sub-lieutenants in most commonwealth countries are identical to the United States Navy and United States Coast Guard grade of ensign (although US ranks do not use the executive curl), even though its equivalent grade in the USN is actually lieutenant junior grade.

In the Royal Canadian Navy, acting sub-lieutenants display one medium stripe. A sub-lieutenant adds a narrow stripe below the medium stripe to maintain the executive curl on the top. The equivalent air force lieutenant rank has the narrow stripe above the medium stripe since these elements do not need to maintain spacing on top due to the lack of an executive curl; the Royal Canadian Navy followed this pattern before the addition of the curl in 2010.

=== Gallery ===
Acting sub-lieutenant
(French: Enseigne de vaisseau de 2e classe)
(Royal Canadian Navy)

Sub-lieutenant
(Royal Navy)

=== Acting sub-lieutenant ===
In 1955, the Royal Navy created the rank of acting sub-lieutenant, although it had existed intermittently in the world wars. Unlike their substantive counterparts, acting sub-lieutenants are subordinate officers, as they hold their ranks by order and not by commission. Upon passing fleet board, acting sub-lieutenants were confirmed as sub-lieutenants and issued commissions backdated to the date when they were appointed acting sub-lieutenants. The rank of acting sub-lieutenant was abolished in the Royal Navy around 1993 but remained in the Royal Naval Reserve until 2013; officers in both the RN and RNR now commission into the rank of midshipman. The rank of acting sub-lieutenant remains in the Royal Navy only within the University Royal Naval Unit where training officers enter at this rank.

Before its abolition, the rank of acting sub-lieutenant in the Royal Navy corresponded with, but was junior to, the ranks of lieutenant (Army) and flying officer (RAF).

In many Commonwealth navies (e.g. Canada and Australia), the rank of acting sub-lieutenant still exists as a commissioned rank equivalent to second lieutenant, while the rank of sub-lieutenant is equivalent to that of an army lieutenant. As the term "acting" is a designation, both acting and substantive ranks should be addressed as "sub-lieutenant"; the full designation including "acting" should be used in written documents, however. Indeed, when someone is addressed as "acting sub-lieutenant", it can be seen as a way of patronising an individual in a derogatory manner due to the emphasis of their "acting" rank.

The Royal New Zealand Navy, Republic of Fiji Navy and South African Navy follows the US precedent in titling its lowest commissioned officer ensign.

In the Royal Thai Army, Army Reserve Force Students who complete grade 5 and their B.D. are promoted to the rank of acting second lieutenant (ว่าที่ ร้อยตรี).

== See also ==
- Comparative military ranks
- Lieutenant (junior grade), as in the United States Navy
