= Turnour =

Turnour may refer to:

- Edward Garth-Turnour, 1st Earl Winterton (1734–1788), British politician
- Edward Turnour, 4th Earl Winterton (1810–1879), first-class cricketer who played 25 times for Sussex CCC
- Edward Turnour, 5th Earl Winterton (1837–1907), Irish peer and cricketer
- Edward Turnour, 6th Earl Winterton PC (1883–1962), Irish peer and British politician
- Edward Turnour (speaker) (1617–1676), Speaker of the House of Commons of England
- George Turnour, British civil servant, scholar and a historian
- Jim Turnour (born 1966), the Australian Labor Party MP for the division of Leichhardt
- Turnour Island, in the Johnstone Strait region of the Central Coast of British Columbia

== See also ==
- Baron Turnour, title in the Peerage of Ireland
- Turnour Prize, the oldest of the panel prizes at Royal College Colombo
- Tourneur
- Turner (disambiguation)
