= Edward Turnour =

Edward Turnour may refer to:

- Edward Turnour (speaker) (1617–1676), Speaker of the House of Commons
- Edward Turnour (died 1721) (1643–1721), son of the above, MP for Orford
- Edward Turnour, 1st Earl Winterton (1734–1788), great-grandson of the above
- Edward Turnour, 2nd Earl Winterton (1758–1831), son of the above
- Edward Turnour, 3rd Earl Winterton (1784–1833), son of the above
- Edward Turnour, 4th Earl Winterton (1810–1879), son of the above
- Edward Turnour, 5th Earl Winterton (1837–1907), son of the above
- Edward Turnour, 6th Earl Winterton (1883–1962), son of the above
