= Monteath =

Monteath is a surname. Notable people with the surname include:

- Alastair Monteath (1913–1942), New Zealand cricketer
- Alec Monteath (1941–2021), Scottish actor and announcer for Scottish Television
- Bruce Monteath (born 1955), Australian football player
- David Monteath (1887–1961), British civil servant
- James Monteath (1847–1929), Scottish administrator in British India
- John Monteath (1878–1955), Irish cricketer and colonial official in British India
- Peter Monteath (born 1961), Australian historian
- Sue Monteath (born 1959), Australian football player
