= 1904 Horsham by-election =

UK parliamentary by-election

- 11 November 1904

Candidate	Turnour	Erskine
Party	Conservative	Liberal
Popular vote	4,388	3,604
Percentage	54.9%	45.1%
MP before election
Johnstone
Conservative
Subsequent MP
Viscount Turnour
Conservative

The 1904 Horsham by-election was held on 11 November 1904. This resulted in the election of the Conservative, Viscount Turnour who held the seat for the incumbent party.

== Electoral history ==
General election 1900: Horsham
Party	Candidate	Votes	%	±%
Conservative	John Heywood Johnstone	Unopposed		
Conservative hold				

== Result ==
Horsham by-election, 1904
Party	Candidate	Votes	%	±%
Conservative	Viscount Turnour	4,388	54.9	N/A
Liberal	Lestocq Robert Erskine	3,604	45.1	New
Majority		784	9.8	N/A
Turnout		7,992	78.5	N/A
Registered electors		10,183		
Conservative hold		Swing	N/A	

== Aftermath ==
General election 1906: Horsham
Party	Candidate	Votes	%	±%
Conservative	Viscount Turnour	4,903	53.4	−1.5
Liberal	Lestocq Robert Erskine	4,286	46.6	+1.5
Majority		617	6.8	−3.0
Turnout		9,189	87.4	+8.9
Registered electors		10,508		
Conservative hold		Swing	-1.5	
