= David Monteath =

British civil servant

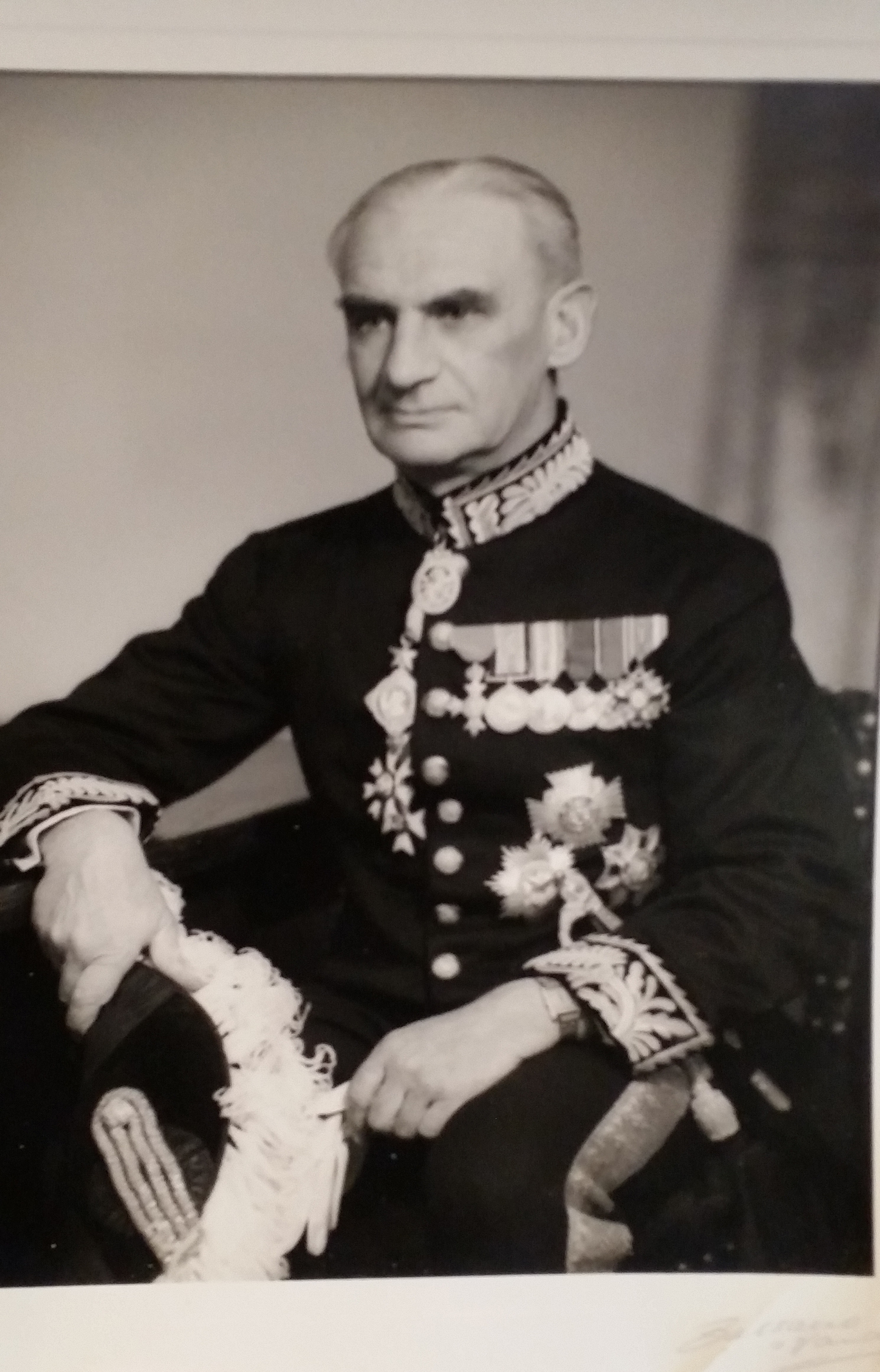
Sir David Taylor Monteath

Sir David Taylor Monteath KCB KCSI KCMG CVO OBE (7 April 1887 – 27 September 1961) was a British civil servant, working at the India Office in London, who was the last Permanent Under Secretary of State for India and Burma before independence meant that the post was no longer required.

== Early life and education ==
Monteath was born in Barton Regis Hundred, Gloucestershire, the youngest son of Sir James Monteath, an Indian Civil Servant of the Bombay Cadre, who, for some time in 1903, had functioned as Acting Governor of Bombay. His elder brother was John Monteath. Sir David was educated at Clifton College and Trinity College, Oxford.

== Career ==
In 1910, Monteath originally joined the Admiralty as an Admiralty Clerk Class I, but transferred the very next year to the India Office as a junior clerk in the Correspondence Department. During the First World War, however, he went back temporarily to the Admiralty, being commissioned as a temporary Lieutenant in the Royal Navy Volunteer Reserve and receiving an OBE in 1918. He returned in 1919 as Private Secretary to the then Under Secretary of State, Sir Thomas Holderness, followed by Sir William Duke and Sir Arthur Hirtzel. In 1927, he became Private Secretary to the then Secretary of State for India, F. E. Smith, Lord Birkenhead, the great friend of Sir Winston Churchill. He continued to act in this capacity till 1931, when he was promoted as Assistant Under-Secretary of State looking after the affairs of the Indian and Burmese Round Table Conferences, especially the Burmese, where he was Secretary to the Conference. In 1937, he was given independent charge of Burmese Affairs as Under-Secretary of State, till 1941, when with Sir Findlater Stewart going off into what he considered to be more pressing wartime work, he became Under-Secretary for both India and Burma, and there he remained till the independence of both countries made his post unnecessary.

== Honours ==
Monteath was appointed an OBE in 1918, a CVO in 1931, a CB in 1938, a KCMG in 1941, a KCB in 1944, and a KCSI in 1948. He received numerous honours and awards after retirement

He died in Abingdon, Berkshire in 1961.
