= Earl Winterton =

Title in the peerage of Ireland

Earldom of Winterton
- Arms of Turnour: Ermines, on a cross quarterly pierced argent four fers-de-molines sable. Crest: A Lion passant guardant argent holding in the dexter forepaw a fer-de-moline sable. Supporters: Dexter: On either side a lion argent, semée of fers-de-molines sable.
- Creation date: 12 February 1766
- Created by: King George III
- Peerage: Peerage of Ireland
- First holder: Edward Turnour, 1st Baron Winterton
- Present holder: David Turnour, 8th Earl Winterton
- Heir presumptive: Robert Charles Turnour
- Remainder to: The 1st Earls’ heirs male of the body lawfully begotten
- Subsidiary titles: Viscount Turnour; Baron Winterton
- Status: Extant
- Former seat: Shillinglee
- Motto: ESSE QUAM VIDERI (To be, rather than seem)

Earl Winterton, in the County of Galway, is a title in the Peerage of Ireland. It was created in 1766 for Edward Turnour, 1st Baron Winterton, who represented Bramber in the House of Commons. Turnour had already been created Baron Winterton, of Gort in the County of Galway, in 1761, and was made Viscount Turnour, of Gort in the County of Galway, at the same time as he was given the earldom. These titles are also in the Peerage of Ireland. Born Edward Turnour Garth, Lord Winterton was the son of Joseph Garth and Sarah Garth (died 1744), daughter of Francis Gee and his wife Sarah, daughter of Sir Edward Turnour, Member of Parliament for Orford, elder son of Sir Edward Turnour, Speaker of the House of Commons from 1661 to 1671. His mother was sole heiress to the Turnor (or Turnour) estates and on her death in 1744 he assumed by Royal licence the surname of Turnour.

Lord Winterton's great-great-great-grandson (the titles having descended from father to son), the sixth Earl, was a Conservative politician. He represented Horsham in the House of Commons for almost fifty years and served as Under-Secretary of State for India and as Chancellor of the Duchy of Lancaster. In 1952 he was created Baron Turnour, of Shillinglee in the County of Sussex, in the Peerage of the United Kingdom. This title became extinct on his death in 1962. He was succeeded in the Irish titles by his third cousin once removed, the seventh Earl, who lived in Canada, as does his nephew, the eighth Earl, who succeeded him in 1991. He is the eldest son of Noel Turnour, the seventh Earl's younger brother.

The ancestral seat of the Turnour family was Shillinglee, West Sussex. The titles of the earldom and original barony (despite being in the Peerage of Ireland) referred to the village of Winterton-on-Sea in Norfolk, where the Turnour family also owned land.

== Earls Winterton (1766) ==
- Edward Garth-Turnour, 1st Earl Winterton (1734–1788)
- Edward Turnour, 2nd Earl Winterton (1758–1831)
- Edward Turnour, 3rd Earl Winterton (1784–1833)
- Edward Turnour, 4th Earl Winterton (1810–1879)
- Edward Turnour, 5th Earl Winterton (1837–1907)
- Edward Turnour, 6th Earl Winterton (1883–1962)
- Robert Chad Turnour, 7th Earl Winterton (1915–1991)
- (Donald) David Turnour, 8th Earl Winterton (b. 1943)

== Present peer ==
Donald David Turnour, 8th Earl Winterton (born 13 October 1943) is the son of Cecil Noel Turnour and his wife Evelyn Isobel Oulton. He was educated at Waterloo Lutheran University, where he graduated BA. In 1968, he married Jill Pauline Esplen, a daughter of John George Esplen, and they were divorced in 1997, then having two daughters, Michele Susan Turnour (born 1973) and Amy Elizabeth Turnour (born 1976).

On 2 June 1991, Turnour succeeded as Earl Winterton, Viscount Turnour of Gort, and Baron Winterton, all in the peerage of Ireland, so that he did not inherit a seat in the House of Lords. A Canadian, in 2003 he was living in Canada.

The heir presumptive is the present holder's younger brother Robert Charles Turnour (born 1950), whose heir presumptive is their younger brother Murray John Turnour (born 1951), whose heir apparent is his son Jonathan Winterton Behan Turnour (born 1985).

== Line of succession ==
- Edward Garth-Turnour, 1st Earl Winterton (1734–1788)
  - Edward Turnour, 2nd Earl Winterton (1758–1831)
    - Edward Turnour, 3rd Earl Winterton (1784–1833)
      - Edward Turnour, 4th Earl Winterton (1810–1879)
        - Edward Turnour, 5th Earl Winterton (1837–1907)
          - Edward Turnour, 6th Earl Winterton (1883–1962)
    - The Revd and Hon. Adolphus Turnour (1789–1857)
      - Charles Turnour (1815–1878)
        - Charles Turnour (1853–1885)
          - Cecil Turnour (1880–1953)
            - Robert Turnour, 7th Earl Winterton (1915–1991)
            - Cecil Turnour (1919–1987)
              - David Turnour, 8th Earl Winterton (b. 1943)
              - (1) Robert Turnour (b. 1950)
              - (2) Murray Turnour (b. 1951)
                - (3) Jonathan Turnour (b. 1985)
