= Simon Wilde =

English cricket writer

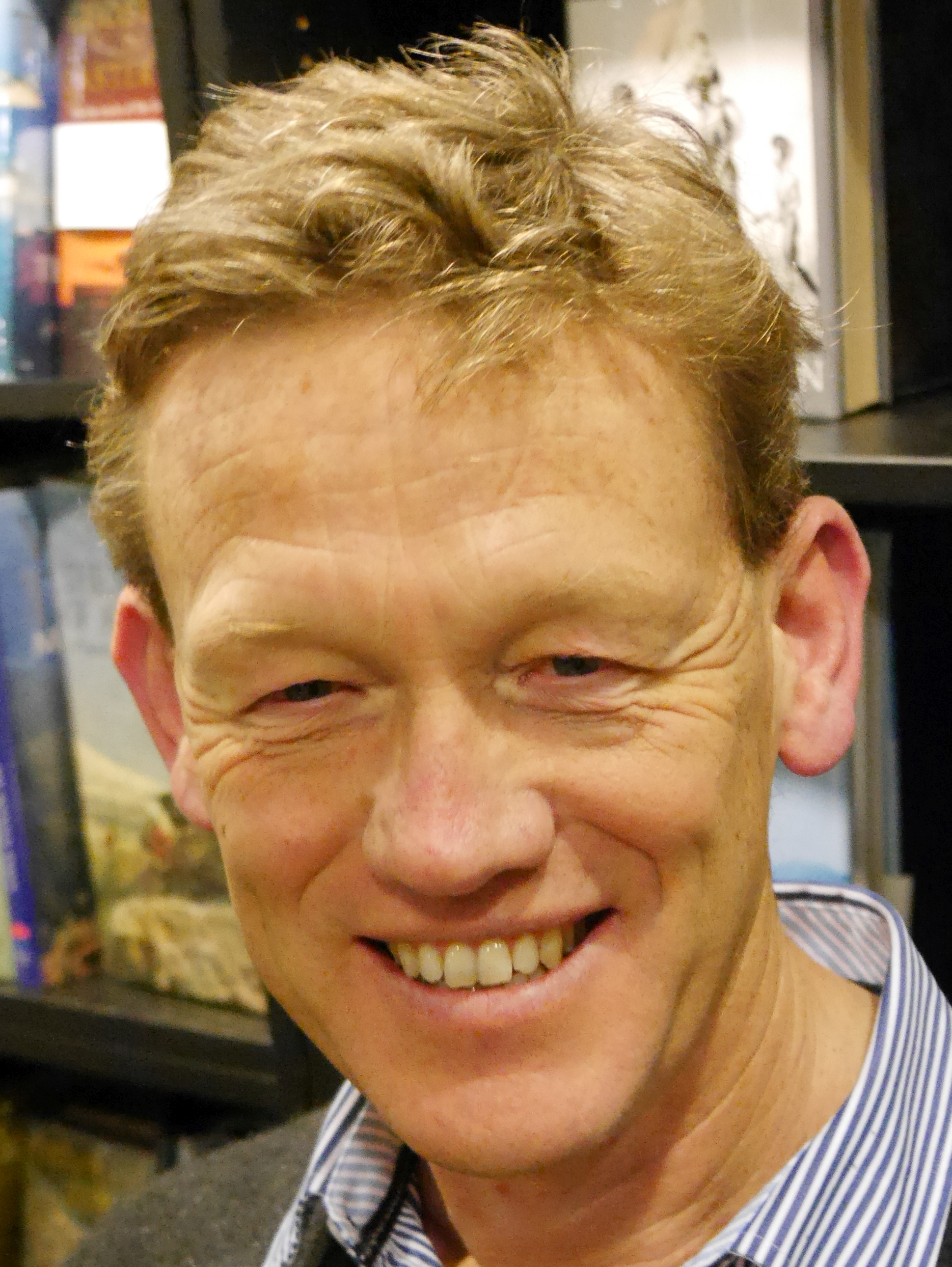
Simon Wilde, Hatchards, London, November 2018

Simon Wilde (born 1960) is an English cricket journalist and author. He has written for The Times and The Sunday Times since 1998, and is currently the latter's cricket correspondent. Three of his books have been short-listed for the William Hill Sports Book of the Year award: Ranji: A Genius Rich and Strange (1990), Letting Rip: The Fast Bowling Threat from Lillee to Waqar (1994) and Shane Warne: Portrait of a Flawed Genius (2007).

When his book on Ranji was reissued in 2005, a reviewer in The Independent wrote that it was "superbly researched and as well written". In reviewing Wilde's book on Warne, Andrew Baker, writing in the Daily Telegraph, said that "Wilde has some pedigree in the quality cricket book market", and that the book "is a bit more than sensible and objective. It is entertaining, too..."

In recent years, he has written the annual review of events in world cricket in the previous year for Wisden Cricketers' Almanack.

He has three children and lives in Hampshire.

== Bibliography ==
- Ranji: A Genius Rich and Strange, Kingswood, 1990, ISBN 978-0-413-63520-4
- Letting Rip: The Fast Bowling Threat from Lillee to Waqar, Gollancz/Witherby, 1994, ISBN 978-0-85493-242-9
- Number One: The World's Best Batsmen and Bowlers, Gollancz, 1998, ISBN 978-0-575-06453-9
- Caught: The Full Story of Corruption in International Cricket, Aurum Press, 2001, ISBN 978-1-85410-816-6
- Shane Warne: Portrait of a Flawed Genius, John Murray Publishers, 2007, ISBN 978-0-7195-6869-5
- Ian Botham: The Power and the Glory, Simon & Schuster UK, 2011, ISBN 978-1-84739-798-0
- England The Biography: The Story of English Cricket 1877-2019, Simon & Schuster UK, 2019, ISBN 9781471154843
- Chasing Jessop: The Mystery of England Cricket's Oldest Record, Bloomsbury, 2025, ISBN 9781526692535

Note: He was also the ghost writer for Graham Thorpe's autobiography: Graham Thorpe: Rising from the Ashes (2005).
