= Shillinglee =

Listed house in Plaistow, West Sussex, England

Coordinates: 51°05′02″N 0°37′07″W

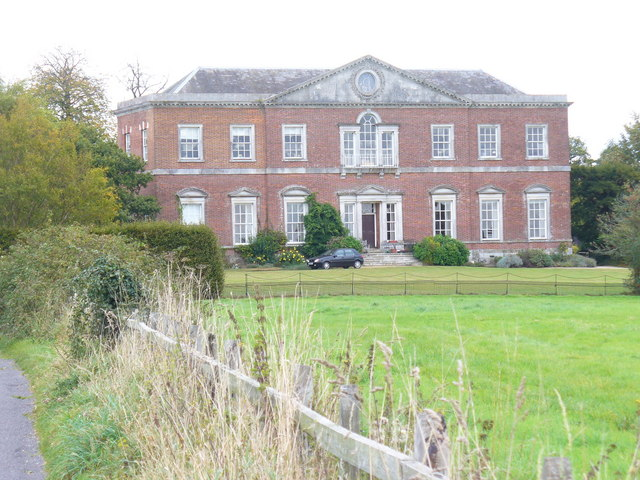
Shillinglee House, as rebuilt after the fire of 1943

Shillinglee is an 18th-century Grade II* listed country house in the parish of Chiddingfold, in West Sussex, England, near the Surrey border, situated between the villages of Chiddingfold and Plaistow. It was the seat of the Turnour family, Earls Winterton, who now live in Canada.

== History ==
The house was built in 1735 and remodelled in the 1770s. Shillinglee was originally a manor within the Arundel Castle Estate, belonging to the Duke of Norfolk. A 2,000 acres (810 ha) landscaped park was laid out in the 1770s with fishponds and tree planting in the style of Capability Brown, but has been changed significantly since. There is little documentary evidence for the design but it is known that in 1766 there were 26 gardeners employed.

== Cricketing heritage ==
Both Edward Turnour, 4th Earl Winterton and Edward Turnour, 5th Earl Winterton were first-class cricketers and the Turnour family hosted cricket matches within the extensive parkland of the estate. Records document 19th-century cricket matches played in the grounds, against neighbouring villages. At the start of the 20th century Shillinglee was the summer residence of the Indian Prince Ranjitsinhji, reckoned to be one of the greatest cricketers of all time, who was presumably a guest of Earl Winterton, who at various times was President and Chairman of Sussex County Cricket Club. The grounds formerly contained a public golf course.

== Destruction and rebuilding ==
During the Second World War Shillinglee House was occupied by Canadian forces and in January 1943 (according to a report by a Canadian soldier) the house was accidentally destroyed by fire. It has since been rebuilt and now comprises several apartments forming separate residences.

== Architecture ==
The present red brick two-storey building with attics is of seven bays with a slate roof. The central doorway has rusticated pilasters and a segmental pediment.
