= Findlater Stewart =

British Raj civil servant

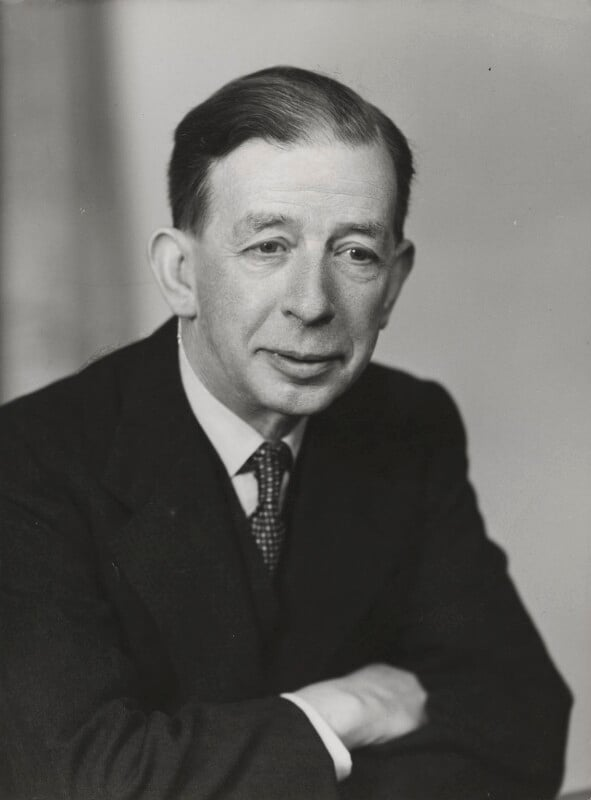
Stewart in 1950

Sir Samuel Findlater Stewart GCB GCIE CSI (22 December 1879 – 11 April 1960) was a Scottish civil servant of the India Office. From 1930 to 1941, he served as Permanent Under-Secretary of State for India, the most senior civil servant in the India Office.

== Early life and education ==
Stewart was born on 22 December 1879 in Largs, Scotland one of the seven children of Isabel Finlator and her husband, Alexander Stewart, a teacher at Brisbane School, Largs. At the age of 14 he entered the University of Edinburgh, graduating with an MA(Hons) six years later.

== Career ==
In 1903 he passed the civil service examinations and joined the India Office in 1903, working on miscellaneous assignments until 1920, when he was appointed to the Royal Commission on the Supreme Civil Services in India.

In 1924, he became Assistant Under-Secretary of State and Clerk to the Council of India, while during the period 1927-1930, he also functioned as Secretary to the Indian Statutory Commission, better known as the Simon Commission. In 1930, he became the Permanent Under-Secretary of State for India, his most important task here being to deal with the various Round Table Conferences and helping promulgate the Government of India Act 1935.

He remained there, until just after the beginning of World War II, leaving to join an executive position in Home Defence and was in-charge of the US military buildup in England. At the end of the war, he worked on various councils and with his experience was a director of various companies.

== Personal life ==
In 1910 he married Winifred Tomblin (d. 1915) with whom he had 2 daughters. Their daughter Gillian married Otto Skutsch, a German-British classicist, in 1938. In 1940 he married Stephanie Robinson.

== Honours ==
Stewart was appointed Companion of the Order of the Indian Empire (CIE) in the 1919 Birthday Honours and Companion of the Order of the Star of India (CSI) in the 1924 Birthday Honours. He was knighted as Knight Commander of the Order of the Indian Empire (KCIE) in the 1930 Birthday Honours and was appointed Knight Commander of the Order of the Bath (KCB) in the 1932 New Year Honours. He was promoted to Knight Grand Commander of the Order of the Indian Empire (GCIE) in the 1935 Birthday Honours and to Knight Grand Cross of the Order of the Bath (GCB) in the 1939 Birthday Honours.
