= Edward Garth-Turnour, 1st Earl Winterton =

British politician (1734–1788)

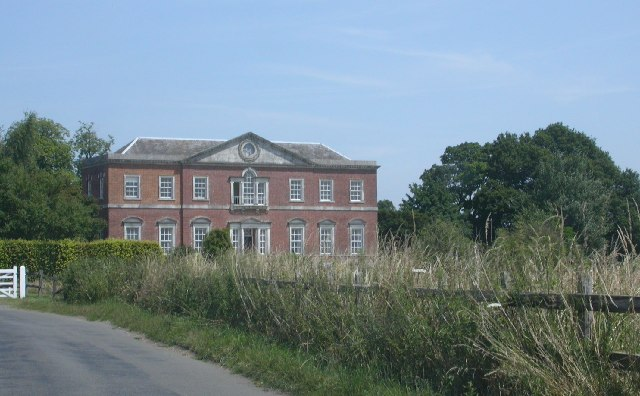
Shillinglee Park

Edward Garth-Turnour, 1st Earl Winterton FRS (1734 – 10 August 1788) was a British politician.

== Life ==
Born Edward Garth, he was the son of Joseph Garth and his wife Sarah (née Gee). On his mother's side he was a great-great-grandson of Sir Edward Turnor, who was Speaker of the House of Commons from 1661 to 1671.

On succeeding to the Turnour estates, including Shillinglee in West Sussex, in 1744, he assumed by Royal licence the surname of Turnour in lieu of Garth. In March 1761, he was raised to the Peerage of Ireland as Baron Winterton, of Gort in the County of Galway. In December, Winterton was elected to the House of Commons for Bramber, a seat he held until 1769. He was further honoured when he was created Viscount Turnour, of Gort in the County of Galway, and Earl Winterton, in the County of Galway, in 1766, also in the Peerage of Ireland.

In 1767, he was elected a Fellow of the Royal Society.

Lord Winterton died in August 1788 and was succeeded in the earldom by his son Edward.

== Family ==
He married Anne Archer (died 20 June 1775) on 13 March 1756, daughter of Thomas Archer, 1st Baron Archer, and Catharine Tipping. They had twelve children:

- Edward Turnour, 2nd Earl Winterton;
- Catherine Garth-Turnour (Abt. 1759 - 18 Jan 1780), married her cousin William Bacon-Foster and died a year later;
- Arthur Garth-Turnour (1762-1794)
- Isabella Garth-Turnour (7 April 1763 - Abt. 1827), died unmarried;
- Gerard Turnour, naval officer (died 21 June 1824);
- Anne Garth-Turnour (Abt. 1765 - 1825), married George Gordon Brown, then secondly, Thomas Remington M.D.;
- Frances Garth-Turnour (17 Dec 1766 - 14 May 1842), married John Allen;
- Lt George Turnour (4 February 1768 - 1813), who married Emilie de Beaussett (d. Aug 1846), niece of Cardinal Duc de Beaussett;
- Henry Turnour, naval officer (1769 - September 1805);
- Sybella Garth-Turnour, died unmarried;
- Lydia Garth-Turnour, (1771-1823) died unmarried;
- Lt Hon Charles Turnour (1775 - 23 February 1816);

He then married Elizabeth Armstrong on 18 February 1778; they had two children:

- Rev Edward John Turnour (8 November 1778 – 10 May 1844). married his step-sister, Elizabeth Richardson and secondly Rebecca Jones;
- Elizabeth Garth-Turnour (1780-1818), married her step-brother, Francis Richardson

== Notes ==
Parliament of Great Britain
Preceded by Andrew Archer; William Fitzherbert	Member of Parliament for Bramber; 1761–1769; With: William Fitzherbert 1761–1762; George Venables-Vernon 1762–1768; Charles Lowndes 1768–1769	Succeeded by Thomas Thoroton; Charles Ambler
Peerage of Ireland
New creation	Earl Winterton; 1776–1788	Succeeded by Edward Turnour
New creation	Baron Winterton; 1761–1788	Succeeded by Edward Turnour
