= James Monteath =

Indian politician

Sir James Monteath KCSI (7 September 1847 – 18 April 1929) was a Scottish administrator in British India. He was the acting governor of Bombay during the British Raj from 5 September 1903 to 12 December 1903.

Monteath was born in Lockerbie, the son of Thomas Monteath. He was educated at the Royal Belfast Academical Institution and Queen's College, Belfast before passing the Indian Civil Service examination in 1868.

He served as a Member of the Council of the Governor of Bombay. He was appointed a Knight Commander of the Order of the Star of India (KCSI) in the 1903 Durbar Honours.

He was married to Amelia Hunter for 54 years. They had three daughters and four sons, including Sir David Monteath and John Monteath, who also served in British India as colonial administrators.
