= Under-Secretary of State for India =

Civil and ministerial position in British India

This is a list of parliamentary under-secretaries of state and permanent under-secretaries of state at the India Office during the period of British rule between 1858 and 1937 for India (and Burma by extension), and for India and Burma from 1937 to 1948.

The parliamentary under-secretary of state was a ministerial position and the permanent under-secretary of state was a civil service position.

== List of parliamentary under-secretaries of state ==
=== India (1858–1937) ===
Portrait	Name	Term of office	
	Henry Baillie; MP for Inverness-shire	1858	1859
	Thomas Baring; MP for Penryn and Falmouth	1859	1861
	George Robinson, 3rd Earl de Grey; Hereditary Peer	1861	1861
	Thomas Baring; MP for Penryn and Falmouth	1861	1864
	John Wodehouse, 3rd Baron Wodehouse; Hereditary Peer	1864	1864
	Frederick Hamilton-Temple-Blackwood, 5th Baron Dufferin and Clandeboye; Hereditary Peer	1864	1866
	James Stansfeld; MP for Halifax	1866	1866
	Sir James Fergusson, 6th Baronet; MP for Ayrshire	1866	1867
	Charles Hepburn-Stuart-Forbes-Trefusis, 20th Baron Clinton; Hereditary Peer	1867	1868
	M. E. Grant Duff; MP for Elgin Burghs	1868	1874
	Lord George Hamilton; MP for Middlesex	1874	1878
	Edward Stanhope; MP for Mid Lincolnshire	1878	1880
	Henry Petty-Fitzmaurice, 5th Marquess of Lansdowne; Hereditary Peer	1880	1880
	George Byng, Viscount Enfield; Hereditary Peer	1880	1883
	John Kynaston Cross; MP for Bolton	1883	1885
	George Harris, 4th Baron Harris; Hereditary Peer	1885	1886
	Sir Ughtred Kay-Shuttleworth, 2nd Baronet; MP for Clitheroe	1886	1886
	Stafford Howard; MP for Thornbury	1886	1886
	Sir John Eldon Gorst; MP for Chatham	1886	1891
	George Curzon; MP for Southport	1891	1892
	George W. E. Russell; MP for Biggleswade	1892	1894
	Donald Mackay, 11th Lord Reay	1894	1895
	William Onslow	1895	1900
	Albert Yorke, 6th Earl of Hardwicke	1900	1902
	Henry Percy, Earl Percy	1902	1904
	Vacant	1904	1904
	Thomas Thynne, 5th Marquess of Bath	1904	1905
	John Ellis	1905	1907
	Charles Hobhouse	1907	1908
	Thomas Buchanan	1908	1909
	Alexander Murray, Master of Elibank	1909	1910
	Edwin Samuel Montagu	1910	1914
	Charles Henry Roberts	1914	1915
	John Dickson-Poynder, 1st Baron Islington	1915	1919
	Satyendra Prasanno Sinha, 1st Baron Sinha	1919	1920
	Victor Bulwer-Lytton, 2nd Earl of Lytton	1920	1922
	Edward Turnour, 6th Earl Winterton	1922	1924
	Robert Richards	1924	1924
	Edward Turnour, 6th Earl Winterton	1924	1929
	Drummond Shiels	1929	1929
	Frank Russell, 2nd Earl Russell	1929	1931
	Harry Snell, 1st Baron Snell	1931	1931
	Vacant	1931	1931
	Philip Kerr, 11th Marquess of Lothian	1931	1932
	Rab Butler	1932	1937

=== India and Burma (1937–1948) ===
Portrait	Name	Term of office		Political party
	Edward Stanley, Baron Stanley; MP for Fylde	1937	1938	Conservative
	Anthony Muirhead; MP for Wells	1938	1939†	Conservative
	Hugh O'Neill; MP for Antrim	1939	1940	Ulster Unionist
	Edward Cavendish, 10th Duke of Devonshire	1940	1943	Conservative
	Geoffrey FitzClarence, 5th Earl of Munster	1943	1944	Conservative
	William Hare, 5th Earl of Listowel	1944	1945	Labour
	Roger Lumley, 11th Earl of Scarbrough	1945	1945	Conservative
	Arthur Henderson; MP for Kingswinford	1945	1947	Labour

== List of permanent under-secretaries of state ==
=== India (1858–1937) ===
Portrait	Name	Term of office	
	Sir George Russell Clerk	1858	1860
	Herman Merivale	1860	1874
	Sir Louis Mallet	1874	1883
	Sir Arthur Godley	1883	1909
	Sir Richmond Ritchie	1909	1912
	Sir Thomas Holderness	1912	1920
	Sir William Duke	1920	1924
	Sir Arthur Hirtzel	1924	1930
	Sir Findlater Stewart	1930	1937

=== India and Burma (1937–1948) ===
Portrait	Name Honorifics	Term of office	
	Sir Findlater Stewart	1937	1941
	Sir David Monteath	1941	1948

== See also ==
- Secretary of State for India

History of English and British government departments with responsibility for foreign affairs and those with responsibility for the colonies, dominions and the Commonwealth
Northern Department; 1660–1782; Secretaries — Undersecretaries	Southern Department; 1660–1768; Secretaries — Undersecretaries		—
Northern Department; 1660–1782; Secretaries — Undersecretaries	Southern Department; 1768–1782; Secretaries — Undersecretaries; 1782: diplomatic responsibilities transferred to new Foreign Office	Colonial Office; 1768–1782; Secretaries — Undersecretaries	—
Foreign Office; 1782–1968; Secretaries — Ministers — Undersecretaries	Home Office; 1782–1794; Secretaries — Undersecretaries		—
Foreign Office; 1782–1968; Secretaries — Ministers — Undersecretaries	War Office; 1794–1801; Secretaries — Undersecretaries		—
Foreign Office; 1782–1968; Secretaries — Ministers — Undersecretaries	War and Colonial Office; 1801–1854; Secretaries — Undersecretaries		—
Foreign Office; 1782–1968; Secretaries — Ministers — Undersecretaries	Colonial Office; 1854–1925; Secretaries — Undersecretaries		India Office; 1858–1937; Secretaries — Undersecretaries
Foreign Office; 1782–1968; Secretaries — Ministers — Undersecretaries	Colonial Office; 1925–1966; Secretaries — Ministers — Undersecretaries	Dominions Office; 1925–1947; Secretaries — Undersecretaries	India Office; 1858–1937; Secretaries — Undersecretaries
Foreign Office; 1782–1968; Secretaries — Ministers — Undersecretaries	Colonial Office; 1925–1966; Secretaries — Ministers — Undersecretaries	Dominions Office; 1925–1947; Secretaries — Undersecretaries	India Office and Burma Office; 1937–1947; Secretaries — Undersecretaries
Foreign Office; 1782–1968; Secretaries — Ministers — Undersecretaries	Colonial Office; 1925–1966; Secretaries — Ministers — Undersecretaries	Commonwealth Relations Office; 1947–1966; Secretaries — Ministers — Undersecretaries	
Foreign Office; 1782–1968; Secretaries — Ministers — Undersecretaries	Commonwealth Office; 1966–1968; Secretaries — Ministers — Undersecretaries		
Foreign and Commonwealth Office; 1968–2020; Secretaries — Ministers — Undersecretaries
Foreign, Commonwealth and Development Office; Since 2020; Secretaries — Ministers — Undersecretaries
