= John Monteath =

Irish cricketer and colonial official

Personal information
- Full name: John Monteath
- Born: 9 October 1878; Ballyholme, Ireland
- Died: 11 June 1955 (aged 76); Awliscombe, Devon, England
- Batting: Unknown

Domestic team information
- Years: Team
- 1903/04: Europeans

Career statistics
Competition	First-class
Matches	1
Runs scored	1
Batting average	0.50
100s/50s	–/–
Top score	1
Catches/stumpings	–/–
- Source: ESPNcricinfo, 1 December 2018

John Monteath CIE (9 October 1878 – 11 June 1955) was an Irish first-class cricketer and colonial official in British India.

Monteath was the son of Sir James Monteath, a colonial administrator in British India. He was educated at Clifton College, before going up to King's College, Cambridge in 1897. He graduated with a first-class in 1900, before joining the Indian Civil Service (ICI) in 1902.

His first post in the ICI was as an Assistant Collector at Dharwar, a position he held until 1908. During this time, he played a first-class cricket match for the Europeans against the Parsees at Bombay. Batting twice in the match, Monteath was dismissed without scoring in the European's first-innings by Kekhashru Mistry, and was dismissed by the same bowler for a single run in their second-innings. Fellow Irishman James McDonogh was also a member of the Europeans team. He served as an Assistant Political Agent in Kathiawar from 1908–1915, before taking up the post of Municipal Commissioner in Ahmedabad, a position he held for a few months in 1915. He was the Postmaster General for the Punjab in 1915–1916, before taking up the same post from 1916–1919 in Madras. He was a District Magistrate for the Bombay Presidency and Sind from 1921–1926, and from 1926–1928 he was the Secretary to the Bombay Government Home Department. In the Indian General Election of 1926 he was elected to the Central Legislative Assembly.

He later served as the Dewan or Prime Minister of Junagadh State, a post he held from 1933–1939. Monteath was made a Companion of the Order of the Indian Empire in the 1937 New Year Honours. He returned to England around the time of Indian Independence, and was living at Bury St Edmunds. He died at Awliscombe in Devon in June 1955.
