= John Heywood Johnstone =

British politician

John Heywood Johnstone DL JP (1850-1904) was a British barrister and Conservative Party politician, who served as Member of Parliament for Horsham from 1893 to 1904.
