= Edward Turnour, 5th Earl Winterton =

Irish peer and cricketer

Personal information
- Full name: Edward Turnour
- Born: 15 August 1837; Plaistow, Sussex, England
- Died: 5 September 1907 (aged 70); Plaistow, Sussex, England
- Batting: Right-handed
- Bowling: Right-arm roundarm fast

Domestic team information
- Years: Team
- 1862–1863: Marylebone Cricket Club
- 1862–1867: Sussex

Career statistics
| Competition | First-class |
|---|---|
| Matches | 7 |
| Runs scored | 49 |
| Batting average | 4.08 |
| 100s/50s | –/– |
| Top score | 27* |
| Catches/stumpings | 6/1 |
- Source: Cricinfo, 1 January 2022

Edward Turnour, 5th Earl Winterton (15 August 1837 – 5 September 1907) was an Irish peer and cricketer. He played first-class cricket for Sussex and the Marylebone Cricket Club.

He married Lady Georgiana Susan Hamilton (1841–1913), daughter of James Hamilton, 1st Duke of Abercorn, by whom he had one son:

- Edward Turnour, 6th Earl Winterton (1883–1962)

Peerage of Ireland
| Preceded by Edward Turnour | Earl Winterton; 1879–1907 | Succeeded by Edward Turnour |
