= Edward Turnour, 4th Earl Winterton =

English cricketer

Edward Turnour
Personal information
- Born: 18 May 1810; Sunbury, Middlesex, England
- Died: 1 March 1879 (aged 68); Plaistow, Sussex, England

Domestic team information
- Years: Team
- 1834–1856: Sussex

Edward Turnour, 4th Earl Winterton (18 May 1810 – 1 March 1879) was a cricketer who played 25 times for Sussex County Cricket Club, without much success. The 4th Earl also had one of the finest beagle packs of the time, rivaled only by those of Prince Albert and the Rev. Phillip Honeywood, from whose pack the entire line of modern beagles is descended.

He was commissioned as Captain of the 6th (Petworth) Sussex Rifle Volunteer Corps on 26 April 1860.

Peerage of Ireland
Preceded by Edward Turnour	Earl Winterton; 1833–1879	Succeeded by Edward Turnour
