= Governor Wilson =

Governor Wilson may refer to:

- Alan Wilson (politician) (born 1973), 58th Governor elect of South Carolina
- David Wilson, Baron Wilson of Tillyorn (born 1935), 27th Governor of Hong Kong from 1987 to 1992
- Emanuel Willis Wilson (1844–1905), 7th Governor of West Virginia
- George A. Wilson (1884–1953), 28th Governor of Iowa
- John Lyde Wilson (1784–1849), 49th Governor of South Carolina
- John Wilson (British Army officer, died 1856) (1780–1856), Acting Governor of British Ceylon from 1811 to 1812 and in 1831
- Leslie Wilson (politician) (1876–1955), Governor of Bombay from 1923 to 1926 and 15th Governor of Queensland from 1932 to 1946
- Malcolm Wilson (politician) (1914–2000), 50th Governor of New York
- Pete Wilson (born 1933), 36th Governor of California
- Robert Wilson (British Army officer, born 1777) (died 1849), Governor of Gibraltar from 1842 to 1848
- Roger B. Wilson (born 1948), 52nd Governor of Missouri
- Samuel Herbert Wilson (1873–1950), Governor of Trinidad and Tobago from 1921 to 1924 and Governor of Jamaica from 1924 to 1925
- Stanley C. Wilson (1879–1967), 62nd Governor of Vermont
- Woodrow Wilson (1856–1924), 34th Governor of New Jersey before serving as President of the United States
