= Edward Harding =

Edward Harding may refer to:

- Ted Harding (1921–2004), Australian politician and rugby league footballer
- Edward John Harding (1880–1954), British civil servant and diplomat
