= Charles Thomas Davis =

British civil servant (1873 – 1938)

Sir Charles Thomas Davis, GCMG (1873 – 1 January 1938) was a British civil servant. He was Permanent Under-Secretary of State for Dominion Affairs from 1925 to 1930.

Davis was appointed a Companion of the Order of St Michael and St George (CMG) in the 1915 New Year Honours, promoted to Knight Commander of the Order (KCMG) in the 1923 Birthday Honours (at which point he was an Assistant Under-Secretary at the Colonial Office) and further promoted to Knight Grand Cross of the Order (GCMG) in the 1928 Birthday Honours.

Government offices
Preceded by Sir James Masterton-Smith as Permanent Secretary, Colonial Office	Permanent Secretary of the Dominions Office; 1925–1930	Succeeded by Sir Edward John Harding
