= Archibald Carter =

British civil servant (1887–1958)

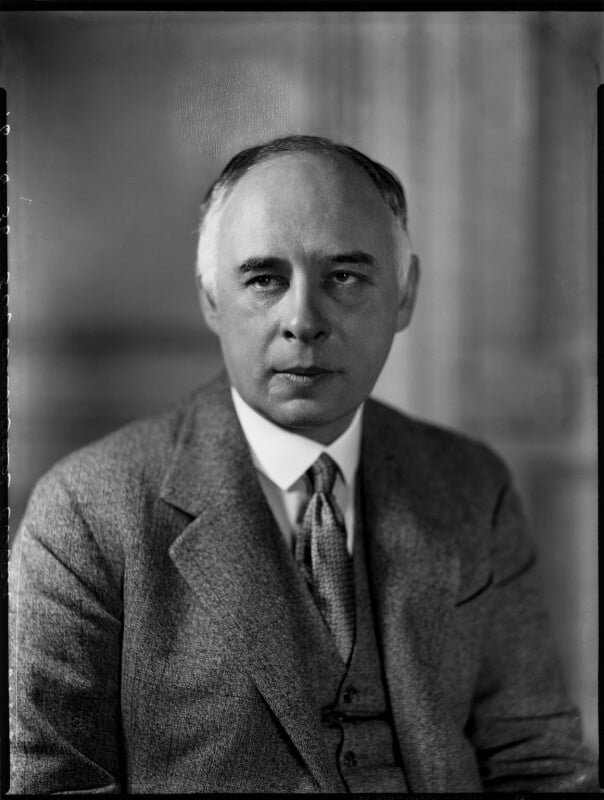
Carter in 1936

Sir Richard Henry Archibald Carter, GCMG KCB KCIE (31 March 1887 – 10 November 1958) was a British civil servant.

== Family and education ==
Carter was born in Brompton, London, the eldest son of Col. Alfred Henry Carter CMG and his wife, Katherine Matilda Tylden. He was educated at Eton and Trinity College, Cambridge, and was a member of the United University Club. He was married in 1923 to the only daughter of W. E. Painter; they had no children.

== Career ==
Carter was private secretary to the Secretary of State for India (Lord Birkenhead) from 1924 to 1927, assistant secretary to the Indian Statutory Commission from 1927 to 1930, Secretary-General of the Round Table Conference from 1930 to 1931, Assistant Under-Secretary of State for India in 1936, Permanent Secretary of the Admiralty from 1936 to 1940, chairman of the Eastern Group Supply Council, Delhi from 1941 to 1942, chairman of the Board of Customs and Excise from 1942 to 1947, Permanent Under-Secretary of State for India in 1947, Joint Permanent Under-Secretary of State for Commonwealth Relations in 1948 and chairman of the Monopolies and Restrictive Practices Commission from 1949 to 1953.

== Honours and death ==
Carter was made a Companion of the Order of the Bath in 1930, a Knight Commander of the Order of the Indian Empire in 1935, a Knight Commander of the Order of the Bath in 1938 and a Knight Grand Cross of the Order of St Michael and St George in 1949. He died on 19 November 1958.

Government offices
Preceded by Sir Oswyn Alexander Ruthven Murray	Permanent Secretary to the Admiralty; 1936–1940	Succeeded by Sir Henry Vaughan Markham
Preceded by Sir Wilfred Griffin Eady	Chairman of the Board of Customs and Excise; 1942–1947	Succeeded by Sir William Croft
Preceded by himself as Permanent Secretary, Burma Office and India Office	Permanent Secretary of the Commonwealth Relations Office; 1947–1949; With: Sir Eric Machtig (1947–1948)	Succeeded by Sir Percivale Liesching
Preceded by Sir Eric Machtig as Permanent Secretary, Dominions Office	Permanent Secretary of the Commonwealth Relations Office; 1947–1949; With: Sir Eric Machtig (1947–1948)	Succeeded by Sir Percivale Liesching
