= Governor Macpherson =

Governor Macpherson may refer to:

- Sir John Macpherson, 1st Baronet (1745–1821), Acting Governor-General of Bengal from 1785 to 1786
- John Stuart Macpherson (1898–1971), Governor-General of Nigeria from 1948 to 1955
