= Cosmo Parkinson =

British civil servant

Sir Arthur Charles Cosmo Parkinson GCMG KCB OBE (18 November 1884 – 16 August 1967), known as Sir Cosmo Parkinson, was a British civil servant who held the position of Permanent Under-Secretary of State for the Colonies from 1937 to 1940 and from 1940 to 1942.

== Family and education ==
Born in Wimborne Minster, Dorset, Parkinson was the only son of Sidney George Parkinson (1852–1890), a surgeon, and Elizabeth Trench (1859–1940). He was educated at Epsom College, where he was head prefect, before going up to the University of Oxford.

== Career and retirement ==
Parkinson joined the Colonial Office as a clerk in 1909, marking the beginning of a 36-year career in the British Civil Service. During the First World War he served with the King's African Rifles and was awarded an OBE in 1919 for his service in East Africa.

Returning to the Colonial Office, he gradually rose through the ranks, working as Assistant Secretary in the Dominions Office (1925–1927), Head of the East Africa Department (1927–1931) and Assistant Under-Secretary for the Colonies (1931–1937). In 1937 he was appointed to the position of Permanent Under-Secretary of State for the Colonies, which he held from 1937 until 1940. He then served as Permanent Under-Secretary of State for Dominion Affairs, but was soon recalled to the Colonial Office after his successor there, Sir George Gater, was transferred to the Ministry of Supply.

Parkinson's second term as Permanent Under-Secretary of State for the Colonies (1940–1942) coincided with several military defeats during the Second World War, resulting in the loss of various colonies, including British Somaliland, Hong Kong and British Malaya. In 1942, after Sir George Gater returned to the Colonial Office as Permanent Under-Secretary, Parkinson was seconded for special duties, which allowed him to visit colonies and discuss local issues with Governors and colonial administrators. He visited the Caribbean and Bermuda in 1942–1943; the Gambia, Nigeria, Kenya, Northern Rhodesia, Nyasaland, Mauritius, Seychelles, Aden and British Somaliland in 1943; and Ceylon and Gibraltar in 1944.

He retired in 1944, but was re-employed during 1945 as an adviser on the post-war reorganization of the colonial service, during which time he visited Fiji and the other Pacific colonies.

Parkinson was the author of The Colonial Office from Within, 1909–1945, which was published in 1947.

He died on 16 August 1967 at the age of 82.

== Honours ==
Parkinson was made an Officer of the Order of the British Empire (OBE) in 1919, a Companion of the Order of St Michael and St George (CMG) in 1931, a Knight Commander of the Order of St Michael and St George (KCMG) in 1935, a Knight Commander of the Order of the Bath (KCB) in 1938 and a Knight Grand Cross of the Order of St Michael and St George (GCMG) in 1942.

Government offices
Preceded by Sir John Maffey	Permanent Under-Secretary of State for the Colonies; 1937–1940	Succeeded by Sir George Gater
Preceded by Sir Eric Machtig (acting)	Permanent Under-Secretary of State for the Dominions; 1940	Succeeded by Sir Eric Machtig
Preceded by Sir George Gater	Permanent Under-Secretary of State for the Colonies; 1940–1942	Succeeded by Sir George Gater
