= Thomas Ingram Kynaston Lloyd =

British civil servant

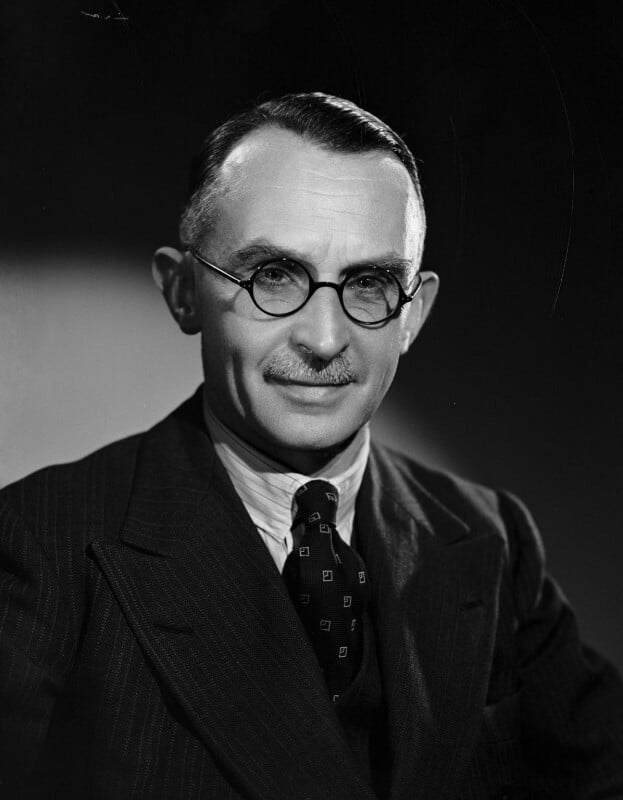
Lloyd in 1947

Sir Thomas Ingram Kynaston Lloyd GCMG KCB (19 June 1896 – 9 December 1968), was a British civil servant who held the position of Permanent Under-Secretary of State for the Colonies from 1947 to 1956.

== Family and education ==
Born in Shifnal, Shropshire, Lloyd was the eldest son of John Charles Lloyd, a corn merchant, and Henrietta Elizabeth Brown. He was educated at the Rossall School in Lancashire, leaving in 1915 with an open scholarship in mathematics. He graduated from the Royal Military College, Woolwich, in 1916 with the rank of Second Lieutenant in the Royal Engineers and was promoted Lieutenant in 1917. During the First World War he served in Egypt and Palestine and was mentioned in despatches.

In 1922 he married Bessie Nora Mason (1901–1992), daughter of G.J. Mason of Penn, Staffordshire, with whom he had two sons. One of them, George Peter Lloyd (1926–2007), served as Governor of the Cayman Islands from 1982 to 1987.

== Career ==
Lloyd entered the British Civil Service after the First World War, serving as Assistant Principal at the Ministry of Health before joining the Colonial Office in 1921. He was appointed Principal Clerk in 1929, Assistant Secretary in 1939 and Permanent Under-Secretary of State for the Colonies in 1947, a position he held until 1956. After retiring from the Civil Service, he served as director of the firm of Harrisons & Crossfield.

He wrote the foreword to Sir Charles Jeffries’s book, The Colonial Office, which was published in 1956.

He died at his home, Faggots End, Radlett, Hertfordshire, on 9 December 1968 at the age of 72.

== Honours ==
Lloyd was made a Companion of the Order of St Michael and St George (CMG) in 1943, a Knight Commander of the Order of St Michael and St George (KCMG) in 1947, a Knight Commander of the Order of the Bath (KCB) in 1949 and a Knight Grand Cross of the Order of St Michael and St George (GCMG) in 1951.

Government offices
Preceded by Sir George Gater	Permanent Under-Secretary of State for the Colonies; 1947–1956	Succeeded by Sir John Macpherson
