= Eady Levy =

British tax

The Eady Levy was a tax on box-office receipts in the United Kingdom, intended to support the British film industry. It was introduced in 1950 as a voluntary levy as part of the Eady plan, named after Sir Wilfred Eady, a Treasury official. The levy, paid into the British Film Production Fund, was made compulsory in 1957 and terminated in 1985.

== Background ==
A levy was first proposed by Harold Wilson, then president of the Board of Trade, in 1949. The levy was intended to assist producers of British films. A direct governmental payment to British-based producers would have qualified as a subsidy under the terms of the General Agreement on Tariffs and Trade, and would have led to objections from American film producers. An indirect levy did not qualify as a subsidy, and so was a suitable way of providing additional funding for the UK film industry whilst avoiding criticism from abroad.

== Establishment ==
The Eady Levy came into effect on 9 September 1950 on a voluntary basis to subsidize British film producers. In 1953, the UK Government indicated it would legislate if the exhibitors did not agree to continue the voluntary agreement. It was not established on a statutory basis until its incorporation in the Cinematograph Films Act 1957 (5 & 6 Eliz. 2. c. 21).

In the Eady Levy, a proportion of the ticket price was to be pooled – half to be retained by exhibitors (i.e. effectively a rebate on the tax) and half to be divided among qualifying 'British' films in proportion to UK box office revenue, with no obligation to invest in further production. The Finance Act 1950 had previously made the necessary changes in the entertainments tax. The levy was collected by HM Customs and Excise and administered by the British Film Fund Agency.

To qualify as a British film, a minimum of 85% of the film had to be shot in the United Kingdom or the Commonwealth, and only three non-British individual salaries could be excluded from the costs of the film, ensuring the employment of British actors, technicians and film crew.

In the first year, the levy was one quarter of a penny (1/4d) per ticket sold and raised $3 million; in the second year the levy was tripled for ticket prices over 12 pence (12d) to (3/4d) to raise £3 million ($8.4 million) per annum.

Eady levy rate
Year	Min. ticket price	Levy
1950	any	1/4d.
1951	3d.	1/4d.
1951	12d.	3/4d.
1957	10d.	1/4d.
1957	13d.	½d
1957	14½d.	3/4d.
1957	16d.	1d.
1957	17½d.	1 1/4d.
1957	19d.	1½d
1957	21½d.	1 3/4d.
1960	11d.	1/9 excess (Note: i.e. one-ninth of the portion of the ticket price above the minimum price.))
1968	18d. (7½p (Note: Decimal currency was introduced in 1971.))	1/9 excess)
1977	12½p	1/9 excess)
1978	17½p	1/9 excess)
1979	any	1/12 full price

== Impact ==
The levy had the effect of both assisting the film industry, and reducing the effect of entertainment tax on film exhibition, to which all the cinema industry was opposed.

The rise in British cinema (including the James Bond films) during the 1960s caused by an influx of American producers can be attributed to the Eady Levy – and also to the cheaper production facilities – making it cost far less in the UK to achieve the same quality of production. A number of American film makers worked in Britain in this period on a near-permanent basis, including Sidney Lumet, Stanley Donen, and John Huston. Stanley Kubrick moved to Britain in the early 1960s to make Lolita (1962), Dr. Strangelove (1964), 2001: A Space Odyssey (1968) and A Clockwork Orange (1971), among other films. Another expatriate American, Richard Lester, directed The Beatles' films A Hard Day's Night (1964) and Help! (1965).

It was not only American film makers who came; a number of distinguished European directors also made films in Britain. These included Roman Polanski, François Truffaut (who made Fahrenheit 451 at Pinewood Studios and on location in London and Berkshire) and Jean-Luc Godard.

The Eady Levy also provided funding for the National Film and Television School, which trained a number of directors and actors still in work today.

== Termination ==
The Eady Levy was intended to support UK film production. However, in a White Paper in 1984, the British Government recognised that the levy was no longer fulfilling its original purpose, with much of the payment going directly to distributors rather than producers, and proving an unreasonable burden on the exhibition sector. The year 1984 had seen the lowest cinema attendances in the UK of any year in recorded history - with only 54 million tickets sold, fewer than one ticket per head of population – thanks largely to competition from TV and home video, so the tax had a significant effect on the cinema chains' dwindling profits. The Eady Levy was terminated in 1985.

== See also ==
- National Film Finance Corporation
