= Eric Machtig =

British civil servant

Sir Eric Gustav Machtig, GCMG, OBE (1889 - 24 July 1973) was a British civil servant. Educated at Trinity College, Cambridge, he entered the civil service as an official in the Colonial Office in 1912; he moved to the Dominions Office in 1930 and he was appointed Permanent Secretary in May 1940; when the office merged with the India and Burma Offices to form the Commonwealth Relations Office in 1947, he became joint Permanent Secretary of the CRO (jointly with Sir Archibald Carter), serving until the end of 1948. Retiring from the civil service in 1949, he became a director of a number of trusts, charities and financial organisations. Both of Machtig's parents were German-born.

Government offices
Preceded by Sir Edward John Harding	Permanent Secretary of the Dominions Office (acting); 1939–1940	Succeeded by Sir Cosmo Parkinson
Preceded by Sir Cosmo Parkinson	Permanent Secretary of the Dominions Office; 1940–1947	Succeeded by himself and Sir Archibald Carter as Permanent Secretaries, Commonwealth Relations Office
Preceded by himself as Permanent Secretary, Dominions Office	Permanent Secretary of the Commonwealth Relations Office; 1947–1948; With: Sir Archibald Carter	Succeeded by Sir Archibald Carter
Preceded by Sir Archibald Carter as Permanent Secretary, Burma Office and India Office	Permanent Secretary of the Commonwealth Relations Office; 1947–1948; With: Sir Archibald Carter	Succeeded by Sir Archibald Carter
