= Liberal education =

Type of education system or course

A liberal education is a system or course of education suitable for the cultivation of a free (Latin: liber) human being. It is based on the medieval concept of the liberal arts or, more commonly now, the liberalism of the Age of Enlightenment. It has been described as "a philosophy of education that empowers individuals with broad knowledge and transferable skills, and a stronger sense of values, ethics, and civic engagement ... characterized by challenging encounters with important issues, and more a way of studying than a specific course or field of study" by the Association of American Colleges and Universities. Usually global and pluralistic in scope, it can include a general education curriculum which provides broad exposure to multiple disciplines and learning strategies in addition to in-depth study in at least one academic area.

Liberal education was advocated in the 19th century by thinkers such as John Henry Newman, Thomas Huxley, and F. D. Maurice. The decline of liberal education is often attributed to mobilization during the Second World War. The premium and emphasis placed upon mathematics, science, and technical training caused a shift away from a liberal concept of higher education studies; however, it became central to much undergraduate education in the United States in the mid-20th century, being conspicuous in the movement for general education.

== Definition ==
Wilfred Griffin Eady, the Principal of the Working Men's College from 1949 to 1955, defined the liberal education his institution sought to provide as "something you can enjoy for its own sake, something which is a personal possession and an inward enrichment, and something which teaches a sense of values".

The American Association for the Advancement of Science describes a liberal education in this way: "Ideally, a liberal education produces persons who are open-minded and free from provincialism, dogma, preconception, and ideology; conscious of their opinions and judgments; reflective of their actions; and aware of their place in the social and natural worlds." Liberally educated people are skeptical of their own traditions; they are trained to think for themselves rather than conform to higher authorities.

It also cultivates "active citizenship" through off-campus community service, internships, research, and study abroad. Some faculty see this movement towards "civic engagement" as more pedagogically powerful than traditional classroom teaching, but opponents argue that the education occurring within an academic institution must be purely intellectual and scholarly.

A liberal education combines an education in the classics, literature, the humanities, moral virtues, and others. The term liberal education in the modern sense should not be confused with liberal arts education; the latter deals with academic subjects, while the former deals with ideological subjects. Indeed, a liberal arts education does not necessarily include a liberal education, and a liberal arts program may even be as specialized as a vocational program.

Unlike a professional and vocational education that prepares students for their careers, a liberal education prepares students to utilize their leisure time. Such an education helps the individual navigate internal and external conflicts in life. For example, a liberal education aims to help students be self-conscious and aware of their actions and motivations. Individuals also become more considerate for other beliefs and cultures. According to James Engel, the author of The Value of a Liberal Arts Education, A liberal education provides the framework for an educated and thoughtful citizen.

== History ==
Definitions of a liberal education may be broad, generalized, and sometimes even contradictory. "It is at once the most enduring and changeable of academic traditions." Axelrod, Anisef, and Lin suggest that conceptions of liberal education are rooted in the teaching methods of Ancient Greece, a slave-owning community divided between slaves and freemen. The freemen, mostly concerned about their rights and obligations as citizens, received a non-specialized, non-vocational, liberal arts education that produced well-rounded citizens aware of their place in society. At the same time, Socrates emphasized the importance of individualism, impressing upon his students the duty of man to form his own opinions through reason rather than indoctrination. Athenian education also provided a balance between developing the mind and the body. Another possibility is that liberal education dates back to the Zhou dynasty, where the teachings of Confucianism focused on propriety, morality, and social order. Hoerner also suggests that Jesus was a liberal educator, as "he was talking of a free man capable of thinking for himself and of being a responsible citizen," but liberal education is still commonly traced back to the Greeks.

While liberal education was stifled during the barbarism of the Early Middle Ages, it rose to prominence once again in the eleventh and twelfth centuries, especially with the re-emergence of Aristotelian philosophy. The thirteenth and fourteenth centuries saw a revolt against narrow spirituality and educators started to focus on the human, rather than God. This humanist approach favored reason, nature and aesthetics.

Study of the Classics and humanities slowly returned in the fourteenth century, which led to increased study of both Ancient Greek and Latin. In the fifteenth and sixteenth centuries, liberal education focused mostly on the classics. Commoners, however, were not too keen on studying the classics, so they instead took up vernacular languages and literature, and also the sciences. Until at least the twentieth century, both humanist and classicist influences remained in the liberal education, and proponents of a progressive education also embraced the humanist philosophy. Study of the classics continued in the form of the Great Books program. Robert Maynard Hutchins brought this program to the University of Chicago. Upon Hutchins' resignation, the university got rid of the program, but an adapted version still exists at Shimer College.

While liberal education is a Western movement, it has been influential in other regions as well. For example, in Japan during the general liberalism of the Taishō period, there was a liberal education movement that saw the establishment of a number of schools based on liberal education in the 1920s.

== Relationship with professional education ==
Liberal education and professional education have often been seen as divergent. German universities moved towards more professional teaching in the nineteenth century, and unlike American students, who still pursued a liberal education, students elsewhere started to take professional courses in the first or second year of study. In the early twentieth century, American liberal arts colleges still required students to pursue a common curriculum, whereas public universities allowed a student to move on to more pragmatic courses after having taken general education courses for the first two years of study. As an emphasis on specialized knowledge grew in the middle of the century, colleges began to adjust the proportion of required general education courses to those required for a particular major.

As University of Chicago professor Martha Nussbaum points out, standardized testing has placed more emphasis on honing technical knowledge, and its quantitative, multiple-choice nature prompts rote learning in the classroom. At the same time, humanistic concepts such as imagination and critical thinking, which cannot be tested by such methods, are disappearing from college curricula.

Thirty percent of college graduates in the United States may eventually work in jobs that do not exist yet. Proponents of a liberal education therefore argue that a postsecondary education must prepare students for an increasingly complex labor market. Rather than provide narrowly designed technical courses, a liberal education would foster critical thinking and analytical skills that allow the student to adapt to a rapidly changing workforce. The movement towards career-oriented courses within a liberal education has begun at places like Dartmouth College, where a journalism course combines lessons on writing style with reading and analyzing historical journalism. An American survey of CEOs published in 1997 revealed that employers were more focused on the long-term outcomes of education, such as adaptability, than college students and their parents, who were more concerned with the short-term outcomes of getting a job.

== Provision ==
As of 2009, said only eight percent of colleges provide a liberal education to four percent of students in the United States. Liberal education revived three times in the United States during periods of industrialization and shifts of social preoccupations—before World War I, after World War II, and in the late 1970s—perhaps as a reaction against overspecialization in undergraduate curricula.

Currently, pressures from employers, parents and governments have defined the type of education offered at educational institutions. Such trends have curtailed the role of education offered in America. Universities have now provided education for the sole purpose to prepare students for the workforce. This idea has negatively influenced the credibility of liberal education which has impacted how students view higher education. The negative impact being a focus on specific disciplinary practices separating it from the original ideology of liberal education as "...a philosophy of education that empowers individuals with broad knowledge and transferable skills, and a stronger sense of values, ethics, and civic engagement ..." Politicians have influenced the type of education provided at universities. These politicians have been recently cutting the funds for universities applying immense pressure on higher educational institutions. Lack of funds have caused many to abandon the liberal arts curricula. Therefore, universities have been forced to provide a curriculum useful for providing a vocational education. The lack of funds to maintain a balanced education system has caused American universities to provide an education with a lack of emphasis on liberal values.

The disappearance of liberal education can also be traced to Liberal Art Colleges. Students are beginning to view higher education as a preparation for careers. This has then led to the natural selection of colleges. The thought of having education that instructs to enhance the individual for the purpose of improving society does not meet current demands. Thus, as a result, Liberal Art Colleges are diminishing along with the emphasis on providing a liberal education.

Chinese universities began to implement liberal curricula between the 1920s and 1940s, but shifted to specialized education upon the establishment of the People's Republic of China in 1949. Higher education reform in the 1990s returned to liberal education. In 2000 Peking University started to offer a liberal education curriculum to its undergraduate students, followed by other institutions throughout the country. In Hong Kong, The Chinese University of Hong Kong has implemented a collegiate system since the establishment of the university in 1960s and since then, it has been known for its emphasis in general education in greater China.

Some of the universities in India have started offering Liberal Arts Education. Ahmedabad University is one such young university which offers students a liberal education focused on research and interdisciplinary learning.

== See also ==
- Liberal arts education

== Works cited ==
- Axelrod, Paul; Anisef, Paul; Lin, Zeng (2001). "Against All Odds? The Enduring Value of Liberal Education in Universities, Professions, and the Labour Market". Canadian Journal of Higher Education. 31 (2): 47–77. doi:10.47678/cjhe.v31i2.183388. ISSN 0316-1218.
- Fong, Bobby (Winter 2004). "Looking Forward: Liberal Education in the 21st Century". Liberal Education. 90 (1). Association of American Colleges and Universities: 8–13. ISSN 0024-1822.
- Freeland, Richard M. (Winter 2009). "Liberal Education and Effective Practice: The Necessary Revolution in Undergraduate Education". Liberal Education. 95 (1). Association of American Colleges and Universities: 6–13. ISSN 0024-1822.
- Geary Schneider, Carol (August 10, 2009). "In Defense Of A Liberal Education". Forbes.com.
- Hoerner, James L. (1970). An Historical Review of Liberal Education (PDF) (Report). Coral Gables, Florida: University of Miami.
- Jaschik, Scott (November 21, 2004). "How to talk about liberal education (if you must)". The Boston Globe.
- Nussbaum, Martha C. (Summer 2009). "Education for Profit, Education for Freedom". Liberal Education. 95 (3). Association of American Colleges and Universities: 6–13. ISSN 0024-1822.
- Ofer, Gur (2007). "Teaching and Research in Modern Economics in the Russian Federation". In Bourguignon, François; Elkana, Yehúda; Pleskovič, Boris (eds.). Capacity building in economics education and research. Washington, DC: World Bank. p. 48. ISBN 978-0-8213-6595-3.
- Project on Liberal Education and the Sciences (1990). The Liberal Art of Science: Agenda for Action. Washington, DC: American Association for the Advancement of Science. ISBN 0-87168-378-4.
- Shoenberg, Robert (Winter 2009). "How Not to Defend Liberal Arts Colleges". Liberal Education. 95 (1). Association of American Colleges and Universities: 56–59. ISSN 0024-1822.
- Van Doren, Mark (1943). Liberal Education. New York: Henry Holt and Company. OCLC 189494.
- Xin, Chen (2004). "Social Changes and the Revival of Liberal Education in China since the 1990s". Asia Pacific Education Review. 5 (1): 1–13. doi:10.1007/bf03026274. ISSN 1598-1037. S2CID 54924895.
- Di Leo, Jeffrey R. (2011). "Who wants the liberal arts?". Symploke. 19 (1–2): 325–328. ISSN 1069-0697.
- "The parent factor: how parents view their school-aged children's options for college." AFT On Campus May–June 2013: 2. Academic OneFile. Web. 26 July 2013.
- Kiener, Robert (18 January 2013). Future of public universities (Report). Vol. 23. CQ Press. pp. 53–80. doi:10.4135/cqresrre20130118.
