= Rothwell (constituency) =

Parliamentary constituency in the UK (1918–1950)

- Former borough constituency for the House of Commons

1918–1950
- Seats: one
- Created from: Barkston Ash and Dewsbury
- Replaced by: Normanton and Wakefield

Rothwell was a parliamentary constituency centred on the Rothwell area of West Yorkshire. It returned one Member of Parliament (MP) to the House of Commons of the Parliament of the United Kingdom, elected by the first past the post system.

== History ==
The constituency was created by the Representation of the People Act 1918 for the 1918 general election. It was abolished for the 1950 general election.

== Boundaries ==
The Urban Districts of Ardsley East and West, Emley, Flockton, Horbury, Rothwell, and Stanley; and the Rural Districts of Hunslet, and Wakefield.

== Members of Parliament ==
Election	Member	Party	Notes
1918	William Lunn	Labour	Died May 1942
1942 by-election	Thomas Brooks	Labour	
1950	constituency abolished		

== Election results ==
=== Election in the 1910s ===
General election 1918: Rothwell
Party		Candidate	Votes	%	±%
	Labour	William Lunn	9,998	46.4	
C	Unionist	Henry Christopher Bruce Wilson	6,621	30.8	
	Liberal	John Athur Yonge	4,909	22.8	
Majority			3,377	15.6	
Turnout			21,528	63.5	
Registered electors			33,899		
	Labour win (new seat)				
C indicates candidate endorsed by the coalition government.

=== Elections in the 1920s ===
General election 1922: Rothwell
Party	Candidate	Votes	%	±%
Labour	William Lunn	17,831	62.8	+16.4
Unionist	Albert Braithwaite	10,580	37.2	+6.4
Majority		7,251	25.6	+10.0
Turnout		28,411	78.4	+14.9
Registered electors		36,227		
Labour hold		Swing	+5.0	

General election 1923: Rothwell
Party	Candidate	Votes	%	±%
Labour	William Lunn	15,115	66.0	+3.2
Liberal	Benjamin Pickersgill Wilson	7,788	34.0	New
Majority		7,327	32.0	+6.4
Turnout		22,903	60.9	−17.5
Registered electors		37,611		
Labour hold		Swing		

General election 1924: Rothwell
Party	Candidate	Votes	%	±%
Labour	William Lunn	16,540	61.8	−4.2
Liberal	Benjamin Pickersgill Wilson	10,240	38.2	+4.2
Majority		6,300	23.6	−8.4
Turnout		26,780	69.3	+8.4
Registered electors		38,635		
Labour hold		Swing	−4.2	

General election 1929: Rothwell
Party	Candidate	Votes	%	±%
Labour	William Lunn	27,320	61.7	−0.1
Unionist	James Wilder Harrison	8,799	19.9	New
Liberal	Herbert Holdsworth	8,141	18.4	−19.8
Majority		18,521	41.8	+18.2
Turnout		44,260	79.2	+9.9
Registered electors		55,869		
Labour hold		Swing		

=== Elections in the 1930s ===
General election 1931: Rothwell
Party	Candidate	Votes	%	±%
Labour	William Lunn	24,897	52.9	−8.8
Conservative	Clifford Harrison Stringer	22,198	47.1	+27.2
Majority		2,699	5.8	−36.0
Turnout		47,095	79.9	+0.7
Registered electors		58,974		
Labour hold		Swing	−18.0	

General election 1935: Rothwell
Party	Candidate	Votes	%	±%
Labour	William Lunn	31,472	64.5	+11.6
Conservative	Gwendoline Beaumont	17,352	35.5	−11.6
Majority		14,120	29.0	+23.2
Turnout		48,824	75.4	−4.5
Registered electors		64,730		
Labour hold		Swing	+11.6	

=== Elections in the 1940s ===
General Election 1939–40: Another General Election was required to take place before the end of 1940. The political parties had been making preparations for an election to take place from 1939 and by the end of this year, the following candidates had been selected;

- Labour: William Lunn
- Conservative: H.J. White

1942 Rothwell by-election
Party	Candidate	Votes	%	±%
Labour	Thomas Brooks	Unopposed		
Labour hold				

General election 1945: Rothwell
Party	Candidate	Votes	%	±%
Labour	Thomas Brooks	43,829	74.0	+9.5
Conservative	Sir Arthur William Milborne-Swinnerton-Pilkington, 13th Baronet	15,370	26.0	−9.5
Majority		28,459	48.0	+19.0
Turnout		59,199	75.3	−0.1
Registered electors		78,588		
Labour hold		Swing	+9.5	
