= William Knox (official) =

William Knox (1732–1810) was an Irish official who acted as joint Under-Secretary of State for the Colonies in Great Britain, and a controversialist known as a pamphleteer of the period leading up to the American Revolutionary War.

== Early life ==
Knox was born in Ireland at Clones, County Monaghan, the son of the physician Thomas Knox and his wife Nicola King, and was brought up in the Church of Ireland, in an evangelical family. He attended Trinity College, Dublin, where he was influenced by Philip Skelton. He received the basics of his political education from Sir Richard Cox, in the Irish House of Commons. Cox published pamphlets to encourage the Irish linen industry, opposed the radical Charles Lucas, and was involved in the fiscal disputes with the Westminster administration.

Lord Halifax appointed Knox "one of his majesty's council and provost-marshal" of the Province of Georgia when Henry Ellis was made governor of the colony in British North America. Ellis and Knox arrived at Savannah, Georgia on 16 February 1757, and Knox returned to England in 1761.

Richard Grosvenor, 1st Earl Grosvenor was then Knox's friend and patron; they were at Paris together in 1763, and it was probably through Grosvenor's influence that Knox obtained his introduction to George Grenville. He became agent in Great Britain for Georgia and East Florida, and in the interests of the colonies sent a memorial to Lord Bute, recommending the creation of a colonial aristocracy and the inclusion in parliament of representatives of the colonies; but his services as agent were dispensed with by resolution of the Assembly of Georgia on 15 November 1765, for two pamphlets written in defence of the Stamp Act.

== Under-Secretary ==
In 1765, also, Knox gave evidence before a committee of the House of Commons on the state of the American colonies, and from the institution of the Secretaryship of State for America in 1770, to its suppression by Lord Shelburne in 1782, he acted as the under-secretary. He was involved in the drafting of the Quebec Act of 1774.

Knox's views formed a basis for the conciliatory propositions of Lord North in 1776; but was a hawk in the prosecution of the American war. He suggested the creation of a separate Loyalist colony from Maine in 1780. The New Ireland plan was approved by the king and ministers, but later was dropped.

== Later life ==
On the suppression of his post, Knox sought compensation: it was refused, taking into account pensions bestowed on him and his wife for the loss, as Loyalists, of their property in America. Knox continued to be consulted even after his dismissal from office. He drafted in July 1783 an order in council excluding American shipping from the West Indies, and on his suggestion the province of New Brunswick was created in 1784, and lands were granted to the expelled Loyalists of New York and New England.

After the death of Sir James Wright in 1786, the Loyalists of Georgia made him their attorney to press their claims to compensation, but his public life then ceased.

Back in Great Britain, Knox was based in Soho, London, but also acquired property in Pembrokeshire, Wales. He was a landowner at Slebech and Llanstinan, and served as High Sheriff of Pembrokeshire in 1786–7.

William Knox from 1801 corresponded with Edmund Fanning as agent for Prince Edward Island. He died at Ealing near London, on 25 August 1810.

== Works ==
Knox published numerous pamphlets. The major ones were:

- A Letter to a Member of Parliament, wherein the Power of the British Legislature and the case of the Colonists are briefly and impartially considered [anon.], 1764.
- The Claim of the Colonies to an Exemption from Internal Taxes imposed by authority of Parliament examined [anon.], 1765. These two pamphlets lost him his post of agent.
- Three Tracts respecting the Conversion and Instruction of the Free Indians and Negroe Slaves in the Colonies [anon.], n. p. or d. [1768]; new edit., with his name, 1789. They were written at the desire of Thomas Secker.
- The Present State of the Nation, particularly with respect to its Trade, Finances, &c. [anon.], 1768; 4th edit. 1769. It was written by Knox, with the assistance of George Grenville, and many portions which were translated into French and Spanish were openly attributed to Grenville. Its prognostications were gloomy, and it contained reflections on the Rockingham Whigs. These provoked Edmund Burke into replying with Observations on the Present State of the Nation, which ridiculed Knox's "funeral sermon"; Burke's tract went through several editions. Knox replied with An Appendix to the Present State of the Nation, containing a Reply to the Observations on that Pamphlet [anon.], 1769. Horace Walpole wrote that from the "same mint" of Grenville and his friends had previously come Considerations on Trade and Finance.
- Controversy between Great Britain and her Colonies reviewed [anon.], 1769, republished 1793, also assisted by Grenville.
- A Defence of the Quebec Act, 1774, two editions.
- Considerations on the State of Ireland [anon.], 1778, reprinted in Extra-Official State Papers, App. i. 22–61.
- Helps to a Right Understanding the Merits of the Commercial Treaty with France, 1788. Knox's desire to augment Irish trade is shown in this tract, and in his letters.
- Extra-Official State Papers addressed to Lord Rawdon and others. By a late Under-Secretary of State, 1789, 2 vols.
- Considerations of the Present State of the Nation, addressed to Lord Rawdon and others. By a late Under-Secretary of State, 1789.
- Observations upon the Liturgy, with a Proposal for its Reform. By a Layman of the Church of England, late an Under-Secretary of State, 1789.
- Letter from W. K., Esq., to W. Wilberforce, 1790, on the abolitionism of William Wilberforce.
- Letter to the People of Ireland upon the intended Application of the Roman Catholics to Parliament for the Exercise of the Elective Franchise, 1792.
- Friendly Address to the Clubs in St. Ann, Westminster, associated to obtain a Reform in Parliament, 1793.
- Considerations on Theocracy, by a Layman of the Church of England, 1796, in favour of "universal goodwill towards our fellow-creatures."

Robert Watt in Bibliotheca Britannica attributes to Knox The Revealed Will of God the sufficient Rule of Men, 1803, 2 vols. It was advertised over his name in 1802. Several letters to and from George Grenville are in the Grenville Papers, vols. iii. and iv., and Knox's opinions are mentioned in Thomas Hutchinson's Diary.

== Family ==
Knox married in 1765, in Dublin, Letitia Ford, daughter of James Ford, who brought him a fortune. The couple had four sons and three daughters.

- Thomas Knox, eldest son, was brought up on the family slave-run estate at Knoxboro Creek on the Savannah River. He was later, as a teenager, in a responsible position in New Brunswick, and married Elizabeth Putnam, daughter of James Putnam. He matriculated at Oriel College, Oxford in 1787, and the same year entered Lincoln's Inn. He later was called to the bar. He took part, as a militia colonel in the unit founded by his father, in the Battle of Fishguard of 1797, but later lost his post.
- George Knox (died 1823), the fourth son, was the father of William George Knox, Chief Justice of Trinidad. William George Knox was the father of the barrister André Blasini Knox.

One of the sons, left land in New Brunswick by his father, gave up a post in the East India Company to move there, where he was encountered there by Joseph Gubbins in 1811.

Of the daughters:

- Caroline married in 1809 Carew Smyth, recorder of Limerick
- Letitia Elizabeth married in 1814 Arthur Dillon, future 3rd Baronet
- Harriet died unmarried
