= 1942 Rothwell by-election =

UK parliamentary by-election

The 1942 Rothwell by-election was a parliamentary by-election held on 7 August 1942 for the UK House of Commons constituency of Rothwell in West Yorkshire.

The seat became vacant when the Labour Member of Parliament (MP) William Lunn died on 17 May 1942, aged 69. Lunn had held the seat since its creation for the 1918 general election.

== Candidates ==
The Labour Party selected as its candidate Alderman Thomas Brooks MBE, a miner and trade union organiser who had been a local councillor since 1914.

The parties in the war-time Coalition Government had agreed not to contest vacancies in seats held by other coalition parties, but other by-elections were contested by independent candidates or those from minor parties. (The most recent had been Maldon in June 1942, where an independent Labour candidate won what had previously been a safe seat for the Conservatives).

== Result ==
No other candidates were nominated in Rothwell, so Brooks was returned unopposed. He held the Rothwell seat until the constituency's abolition for the 1950 general election. He is best remembered for his successful campaign to repeal the Witchcraft Act 1735.

Rothwell by-election, 7 August 1942
| Party | Candidate | Votes | % | ±% |
|---|---|---|---|---|
| Labour | Thomas Brooks | Unopposed | N/A | N/A |
| Labour hold | | | | |

== See also ==
- Rothwell constituency
- Rothwell, West Yorkshire
- Lists of United Kingdom by-elections
