= Hilton Poynton =

British civil servant

Sir Arthur Hilton Poynton GCMG (20 April 1905 – 24 February 1996), known as Sir Hilton Poynton, was a British civil servant who held the position of Permanent Under-Secretary of State for the Colonies from 1959 until his retirement in 1966.

== Family and education ==
Born in Oxford, Poynton was the younger son of the classical scholar Arthur Blackburne Poynton (1867–1944) and Mary Sargent (1867–1952). He was educated at Marlborough College and Brasenose College, Oxford.

In 1946, he married Elisabeth Joan Williams, with whom he had two sons and one daughter.

== Career and retirement ==
After passing the Civil Service entrance exam, Poynton was recruited by the Department of Scientific and Industrial Research in 1927. Two years later, he was transferred to the Colonial Office, where his real interests lay, following his appointment as Assistant Principal. He served as Private Secretary to the Minister of Supply and the Minister of Production from 1941 to 1943.

In 1943, he returned to the Colonial Office, serving Deputy Under-Secretary of State in charge of the Economic Division from 1948 to 1959. In 1959 he was appointed Permanent Under-Secretary of State for the Colonies, holding the position until his retirement in 1966, the year in which the Colonial Office merged with the Commonwealth Relations Office to form the Commonwealth Office.

After his retirement Poynton pursued a wide range of interests. He was a member of the Governing Body of the Society for Promoting Christian Knowledge (1967–1972) and a member of the Court of Governors of the London School of Hygiene & Tropical Medicine (1965–1977). He was also a member of the Conservative Commonwealth and Overseas Council's policy study group on the future of the Dependent Territories. He was Treasurer of the Society for the Promotion of Roman Studies (1967–1976) and Director of the Overseas Branch of St John Ambulance (1968–1975).

He died on 24 February 1996 at the age of 90.

== Honours ==
Poynton was made a Companion of the Order of St Michael and St George (CMG) in 1946, a Knight Commander of the Order (KCMG) in 1949 and a Knight Grand Cross of the Order (GCMG) in 1964.

Government offices
Preceded by Sir John Macpherson	Permanent Under-Secretary of State for the Colonies; 1959–1966	Succeeded by Office abolished
