= George Fiddes =

Sir George Vandeleur Fiddes, GCMG, CB (4 September 1858 – 22 December 1936) was the British Permanent Under-Secretary of State for the Colonies.

== Early life ==
George Vandeleur Fiddes was born in Great Yarmouth, the son of George Richard Fiddes and Ellen Greening. He was educated at Dulwich College, his grandmother Jane Greening being a pensioner of the Dulwich College Estate when he was 12 and with whom he was living along with his mother Ellen in 1871. He was subsequently a scholar of Brasenose College, Oxford where he took a second-class in Classical Moderations in 1879.

== Career ==
Fiddes entered the Colonial Office in 1881. He was promoted First Class Clerk, after long service as private secretary, in 1896. He went on to be appointed as Imperial Secretary and Accountant to Sir Alfred Milner, High Commissioner for South Africa, in 1897. In 1900 he was made Secretary to the Transvaal Administration and he returned to the Colonial Office as Principal Clerk in 1902. In 1909 he became Assistant Under-Secretary of State and Permanent Under-Secretary in February 1916. He was made a Knight Grand Cross of the Order of St Michael and St George in 1917.

== Personal life ==
Fiddes married Lucia Marie Simon and had a daughter, Lucia Marie, in 1884 and a son, George Graham, in 1888.

He died in 1936 in Bournemouth.

Government offices
Preceded by Sir John Anderson	Permanent Under-Secretary of State for the Colonies; 1916–1921	Succeeded by Sir James Masterton-Smith
