= Under-Secretary of State for the Colonies =

Junior ministerial post in the United Kingdom

The under-secretary of state for the colonies was a junior ministerial post in the United Kingdom government, subordinate to the secretary of state for the colonies and, from 1948, also to a minister of state.

== Under-secretaries of state for the colonies, 1768–1782 ==
Name	Entered office	Left office
Richard Phelps	1768	1768
John Pownall	1768	1770
John Pownall and William Knox	1770	1776
William Knox and Christopher D'Oyly	1776	1778
William Knox and Thomas De Grey	1778	1780
William Knox and Benjamin Thompson	1780	1781
William Knox and John Fisher	1781	1782

In 1782, following the loss of the American colonies, the office was abolished, and its duties given to the home secretary. From there it passed to the War Office, which was later renamed the War and Colonial Office. In 1854 this office was split, and the Colonial Office reestablished.

== Parliamentary under-secretaries of state for the colonies, 1854–1966 ==
For earlier office-holders see Under-Secretary of State for War and the Colonies.

Name	Entered office	Left office
Frederick Peel	1854	1855
John Ball	1855	1857
Chichester Fortescue	1857	1858
Henry Herbert, 4th Earl of Carnarvon	1858	1859
Chichester Fortescue	1859	1865
William Edward Forster	1865	1866
Charles Adderley	1866	1868
William Monsell	1868	1871
Edward Knatchbull-Hugessen	1871	1874
James Lowther	1874	1878
George Cadogan, 5th Earl Cadogan	1878	1880
M. E. Grant Duff	1880	1881
Leonard Courtney	1881	1882
Evelyn Ashley	1882	1885
Windham Wyndham-Quin, 4th Earl of Dunraven and Mount-Earl	1885	1886
George Osborne Morgan	1886	1886
Windham Wyndham-Quin, 4th Earl of Dunraven and Mount-Earl	1886	1887
William Onslow, 4th Earl of Onslow	1887	1888
Baron Henry de Worms	1888	1892
Sydney Buxton	1892	1895
William Palmer, 2nd Earl of Selborne	1895	1900
William Onslow, 4th Earl of Onslow	1900	1903
Charles Spencer-Churchill, 9th Duke of Marlborough	1903	1905
Winston Churchill	1905	1908
J. E. B. Seely	1908	1911
Auberon Herbert, 9th Baron Lucas of Crudwell	1911	1911
Alfred Emmott, 1st Baron Emmott	1911	1914
John Poynder Dickson, 1st Baron Islington	1914	1915
Arthur Steel-Maitland	1915	1917
William Hewins	1917	1919
Leo Amery	1919	1921
E. F. L. Wood	1921	1922
William Ormsby-Gore	1922	1924
Sydney Arnold, 1st Baron Arnold	1924	1924
William Ormsby-Gore	1924	1929
William Lunn	1929	1929
Drummond Shiels	1929	1931
Robert William Hamilton	1931	1932
Ivor Windsor-Clive, 2nd Earl of Plymouth	1932	1936
Herbrand Sackville, 9th Earl De La Warr	1936	1937
Basil Hamilton-Temple-Blackwood, 4th Marquess of Dufferin and Ava	1937	1940
George Hall	1940	1942
Harold Macmillan	1942	1943
Edward Cavendish, 10th Duke of Devonshire	1943	1945
Arthur Creech Jones	1945	1946
Ivor Thomas	1946	1947
David Rees-Williams	1947	1950
Thomas Fotheringham-Cook	1950	1951
Geoffrey FitzClarence, 5th Earl of Munster	1951	1951
Alexander Lloyd, 2nd Baron Lloyd	1951	1957
John Profumo	1957	1958
Julian Amery	1958	1960
Hugh Fraser	1960	1962
Nigel Fisher	16 July 1962	24 October 1963
Nigel Fisher and Richard Hornby	24 October 1963	16 October 1964
Eirene White and Stephen Taylor, Baron Taylor	20 October 1964	11 October 1965
Stephen Taylor, Baron Taylor and Frank Beswick, Baron Beswick	11 October 1965	11 April 1966
Frank Beswick, Baron Beswick	11 April 1966	1 August 1966

Abolished 1966. Thereafter, see Under-Secretary of State for Commonwealth Affairs.

== Minister of state for the colonies, 1948–1964 ==
Name	Entered office	Left office
William Hare, 5th Earl of Listowel	1948	1950
John Dugdale	1950	1951
Alan Lennox-Boyd	1951	1952
Henry Hopkinson	1952	1955
John Hare	1955	1956
John Maclay	1956	1957
John Drummond, 17th Earl of Perth	1957	1962
George Petty-FitzMaurice, 8th Marquess of Lansdowne	1962	1964

Abolished 1964. Thereafter, see Minister of State for Commonwealth Affairs.

== Permanent under-secretaries of state for the colonies, 1825 and 1854–1966 ==
Name	Entered office	Left office
Sir Robert Hay	1825	1836
Sir James Stephen	1836	1847
Herman Merivale	1848	1859
Sir Frederic Rogers	1859	1871
Sir Robert Herbert	1871	1892
Sir Robert Henry Meade	1892	1897
Edward Wingfield	1897	1900
Montagu Ommanney	1900	1907
Sir Francis Hopwood	1907	1911
Sir John Anderson	1911	1916
Sir George Fiddes	1916	1921
Sir James Masterton-Smith	1921	1925
Sir Samuel Wilson	1925	1933
Sir John Maffey	1933	1937
Sir Cosmo Parkinson	1937	1940
Sir George Gater	1940	1940
Sir Cosmo Parkinson	1940	1942
Sir George Gater	1942	1947
Sir Thomas Lloyd	1947	1956
Sir John Macpherson	1956	1959
Sir Hilton Poynton	1959	1966

History of English and British government departments with responsibility for foreign affairs and those with responsibility for the colonies, dominions and the Commonwealth
Northern Department; 1660–1782; Secretaries — Undersecretaries	Southern Department; 1660–1768; Secretaries — Undersecretaries		—
Northern Department; 1660–1782; Secretaries — Undersecretaries	Southern Department; 1768–1782; Secretaries — Undersecretaries; 1782: diplomatic responsibilities transferred to new Foreign Office	Colonial Office; 1768–1782; Secretaries — Undersecretaries	—
Foreign Office; 1782–1968; Secretaries — Ministers — Undersecretaries	Home Office; 1782–1794; Secretaries — Undersecretaries		—
Foreign Office; 1782–1968; Secretaries — Ministers — Undersecretaries	War Office; 1794–1801; Secretaries — Undersecretaries		—
Foreign Office; 1782–1968; Secretaries — Ministers — Undersecretaries	War and Colonial Office; 1801–1854; Secretaries — Undersecretaries		—
Foreign Office; 1782–1968; Secretaries — Ministers — Undersecretaries	Colonial Office; 1854–1925; Secretaries — Undersecretaries		India Office; 1858–1937; Secretaries — Undersecretaries
Foreign Office; 1782–1968; Secretaries — Ministers — Undersecretaries	Colonial Office; 1925–1966; Secretaries — Ministers — Undersecretaries	Dominions Office; 1925–1947; Secretaries — Undersecretaries	India Office; 1858–1937; Secretaries — Undersecretaries
Foreign Office; 1782–1968; Secretaries — Ministers — Undersecretaries	Colonial Office; 1925–1966; Secretaries — Ministers — Undersecretaries	Dominions Office; 1925–1947; Secretaries — Undersecretaries	India Office and Burma Office; 1937–1947; Secretaries — Undersecretaries
Foreign Office; 1782–1968; Secretaries — Ministers — Undersecretaries	Colonial Office; 1925–1966; Secretaries — Ministers — Undersecretaries	Commonwealth Relations Office; 1947–1966; Secretaries — Ministers — Undersecretaries	
Foreign Office; 1782–1968; Secretaries — Ministers — Undersecretaries	Commonwealth Office; 1966–1968; Secretaries — Ministers — Undersecretaries		
Foreign and Commonwealth Office; 1968–2020; Secretaries — Ministers — Undersecretaries
Foreign, Commonwealth and Development Office; Since 2020; Secretaries — Ministers — Undersecretaries
