= Wilfred Griffin Eady =

British diplomat (1890–1962)

Sir Crawfurd Wilfred Griffin Eady GCMG KCB KBE (27 September 1890 – 9 January 1962) was a British civil servant and diplomat.

Although often referred to by the spelling 'Wilfred' as shown above, the original spelling was 'Wilfrid,' as evidenced by his gravestone, probate record, death index and 1921 census form.

== Biography ==
Eady was born in the village of Villa Nueva, Argentina, the son of George Griffin Eady, a railway civil engineer, and Lilian Armstrong D'Olivier Millar, the daughter of Gen. John Crawfurd Millar. He was educated at Clifton College and read classics at Jesus College, Cambridge leaving with first-class honours in 1912.

He was a British delegate to the Bretton Woods Conference of July 1944 in New Hampshire. The conference was to decide the post-war international financial system; it led to the International Monetary Fund and World Bank. John Maynard Keynes was hailed as the presiding intellect at the conference. Eady, at a banquet on the last night of the conference, remarked, "The whole meeting spontaneously stood up and waited, silent, until he [Keynes] had taken his place. Someone of more than ordinary stature had entered the room."

After the Second World War, Eady negotiated a loan to Britain from Canada of a billion and a quarter dollars and cancelled debts of $425,000,000 (incurred when Canada housed and trained British flyers during the war under the Commonwealth Air Training Plan) and $150,000,000 (other war debts). Eady remarked on this loan, designed to keep afloat a trading relationship between the two countries, that it was by no means a one-way deal and that almost all the money will be spent in Canada, principally on foods and manufactured goods.

Eady was the Principal of The Working Men's College from 1949 to 1955. Liberal Education, the raison d'etre of the College, was defined by Eady as "... something you can enjoy for its own sake, something which is a personal possession and an inward enrichment, and something which teaches a sense of values."

Between 1949 and 1951, he was the chairman of the Civil Service Benevolent Fund.

In 1957, Eady gave his name to the Eady Levy on cinema ticket sales, a tax designed and introduced by President of the Board of Trade Harold Wilson who said, "If you want to get a measure adopted, name it after the civil servant who would have to implement it."

His son was the film director David Eady.

He died in 1962 and was buried at Rodmell, Sussex, England.

Government offices
Preceded by Sir Evelyn Murray	Chairman of the Board of Customs and Excise; 1941–1942	Succeeded by Sir Archibald Carter
