= William Lunn (politician) =

British politician

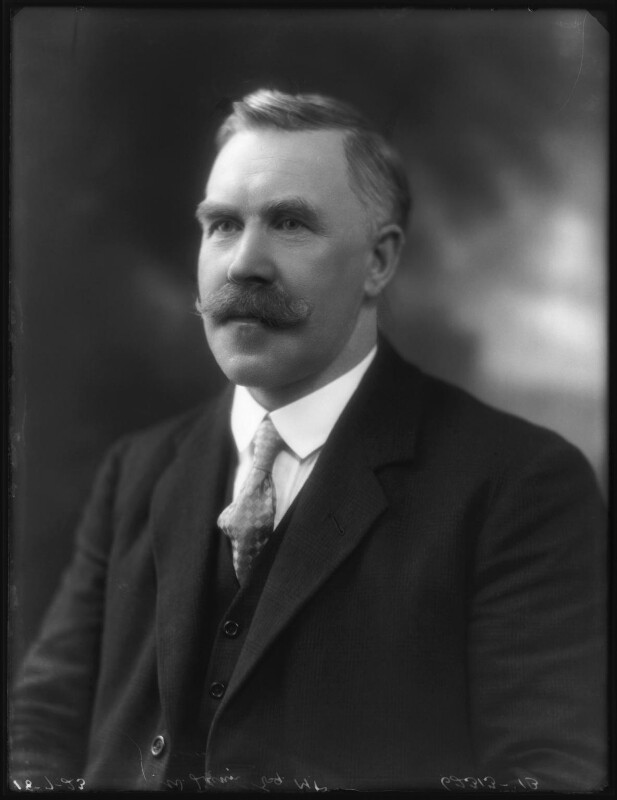
William Lunn

William Lunn (1 November 1872 – 17 May 1942) was a Labour Party politician in the United Kingdom.

== Professional life ==
Born in Rothwell, Lunn began working as a coal miner when he was twelve years old. He was later elected as checkweighman at Middleton Colliery, serving for twenty years.

Lunn was a supporter of the Labour Party, and served on Rothwell Urban District Council and the Hunslet Board of Guardians. He stood unsuccessfully in the 1912 Holmfirth by-election. He was elected at the 1918 general election as Member of Parliament (MP) for the newly created Rothwell constituency, and held the seat until he died in office in 1942, aged 69.

In 1924, Lunn served in Ramsay MacDonald's short-lived First Labour Government as Secretary for Overseas Trade, a junior ministerial post subordinate to the President of the Board of Trade.

When the Second Labour Government took office in June 1929, Lunn was appointed as Under-Secretary of State for the Colonies. He was moved in December that year to the post of Under-Secretary of State for Dominion Affairs, and held that position until the formation of the National Government in August 1931.

From 1931 until 1936, Lunn served on the National Executive Committee of the Labour Party.

== Private life ==
In July 1936, during a debate on the Government's Midwives Bill, Lunn referred to the death of his daughter-in-law, earlier that day, when arguing for more to be done to protect the health of mothers.

== Election literature ==
Election literature of William Lunn
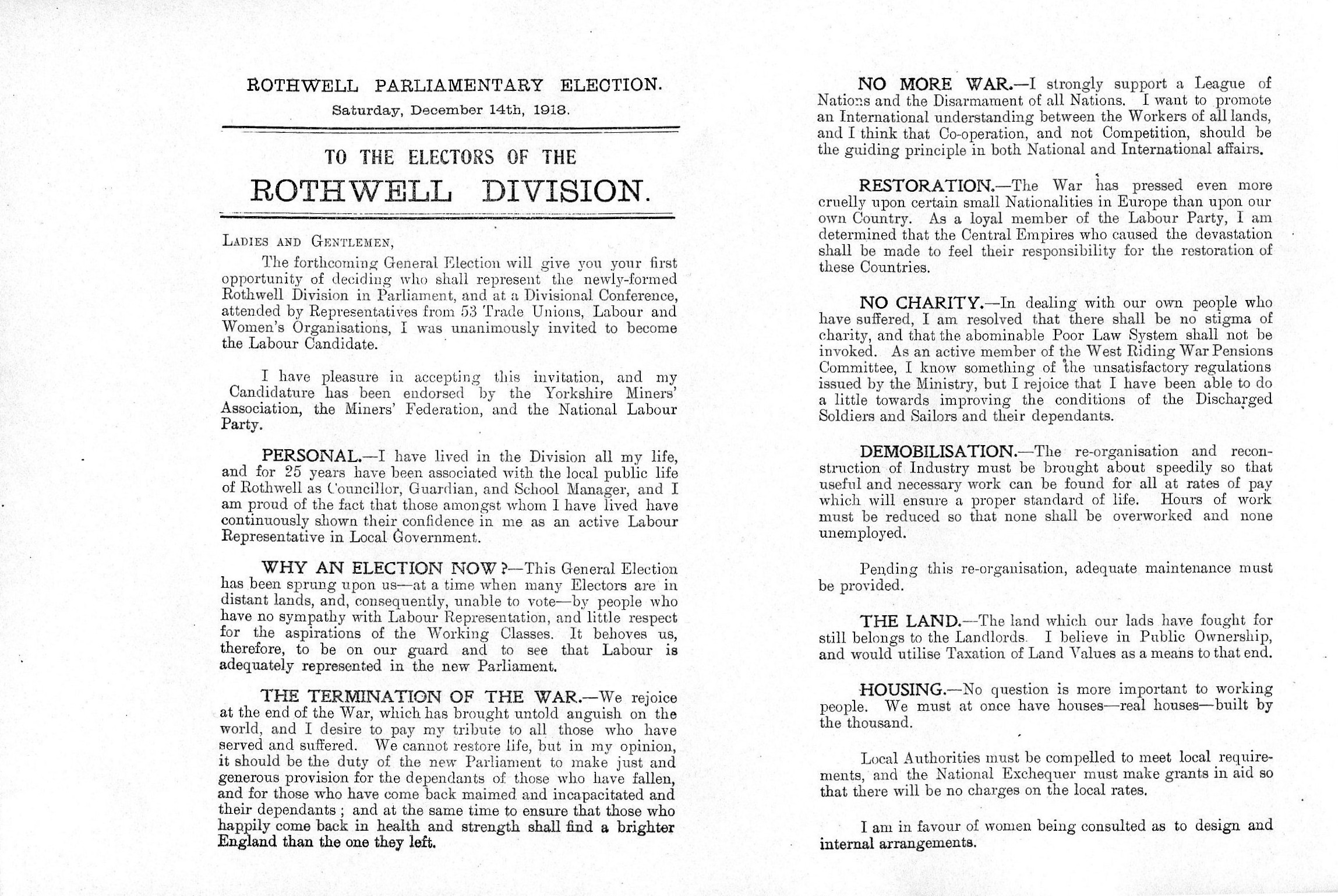
Campaign Flyer 1918 Sheet 1

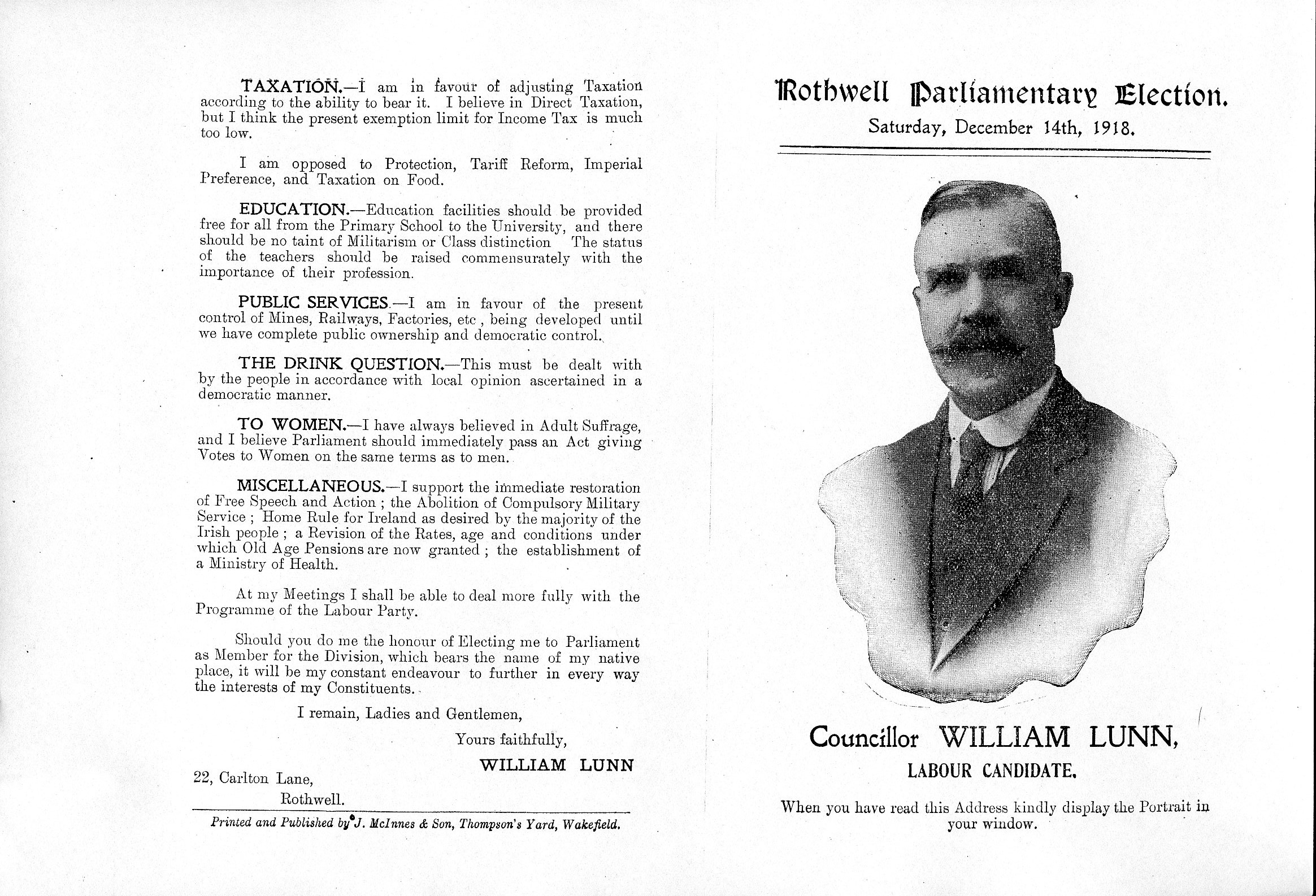
Campaign Flyer 1918 Sheet 2

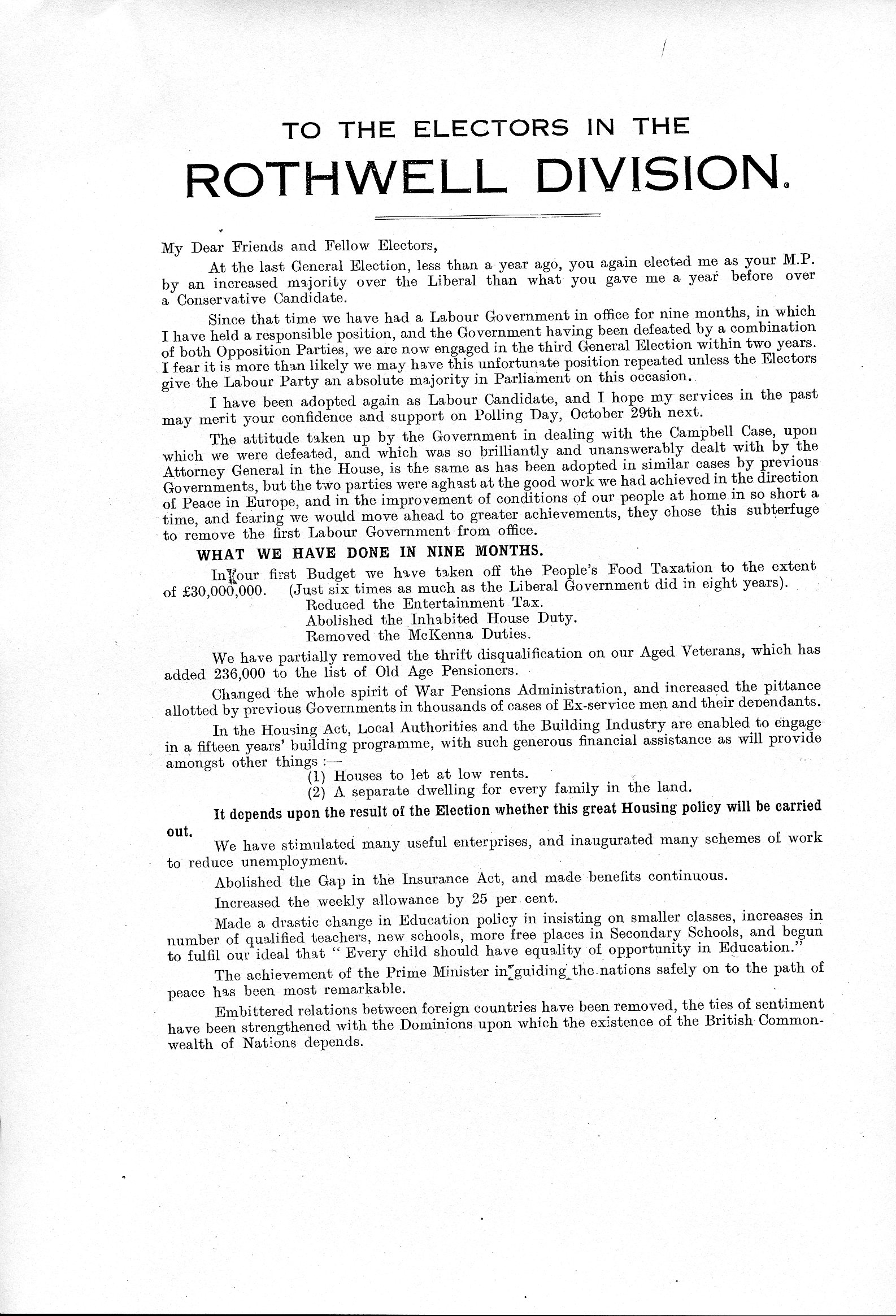
Campaign Flyer 1924 Sheet 1

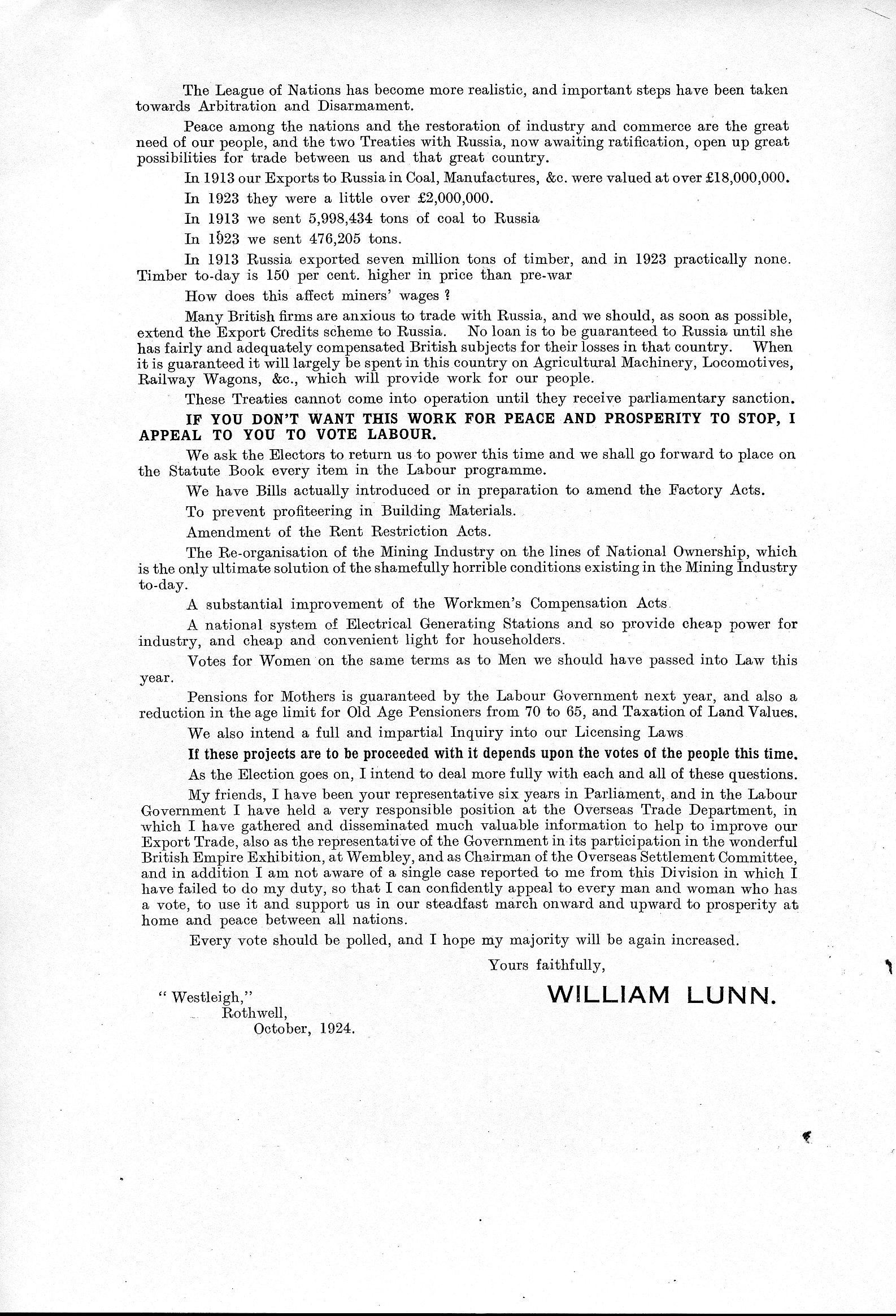
Campaign Flyer 1924 Sheet 2

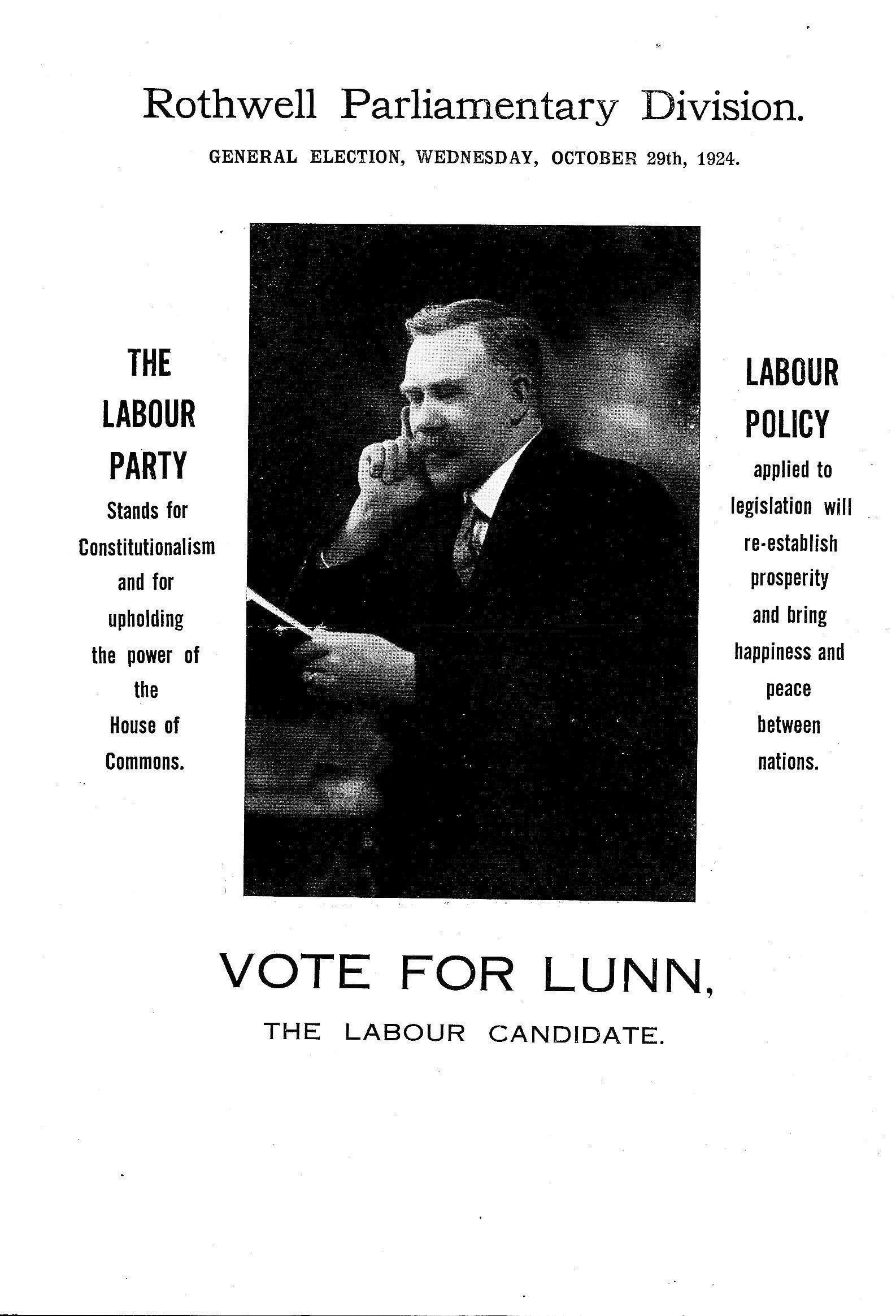
Campaign Flyer 1924 Sheet 3

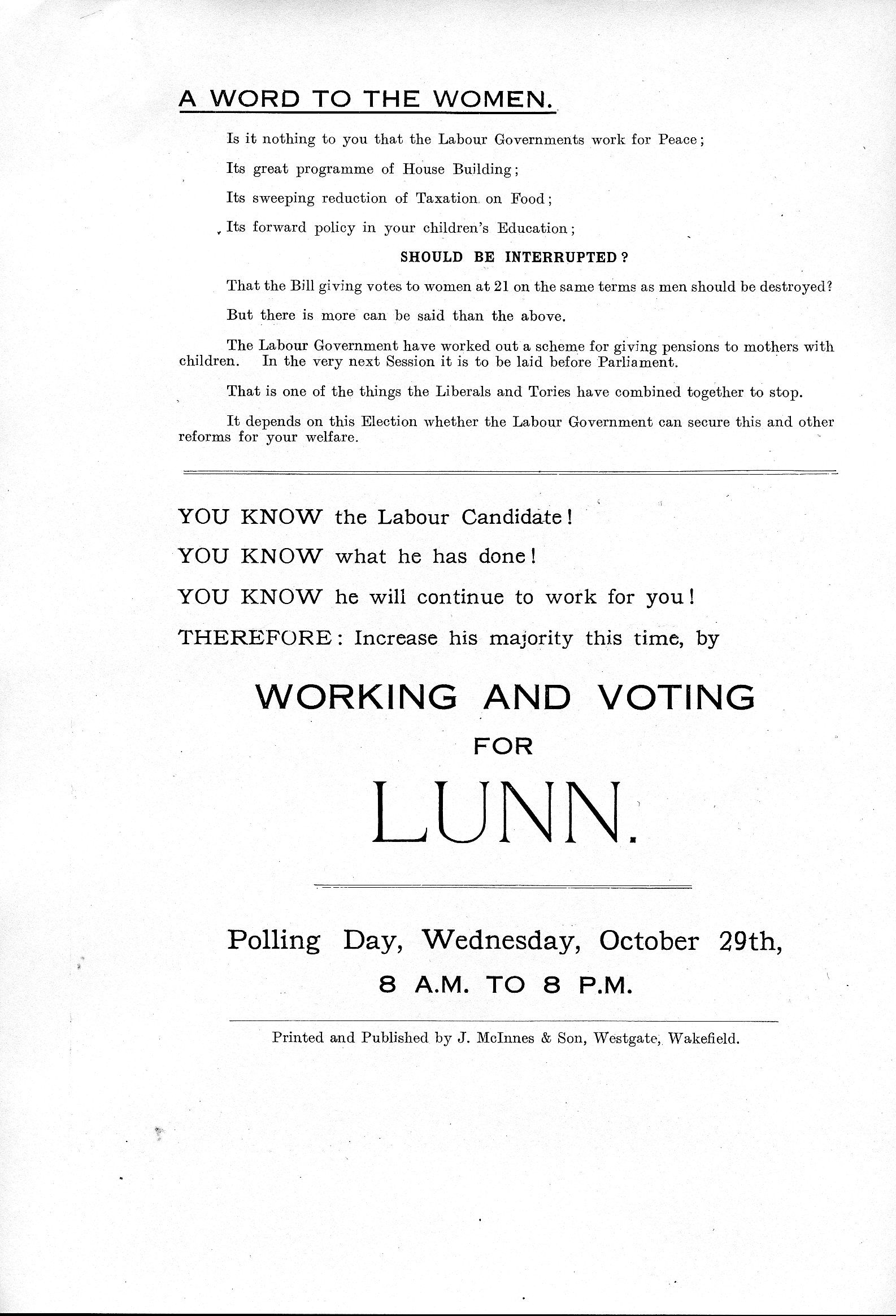
Campaign Flyer 1924. A Word to the Women

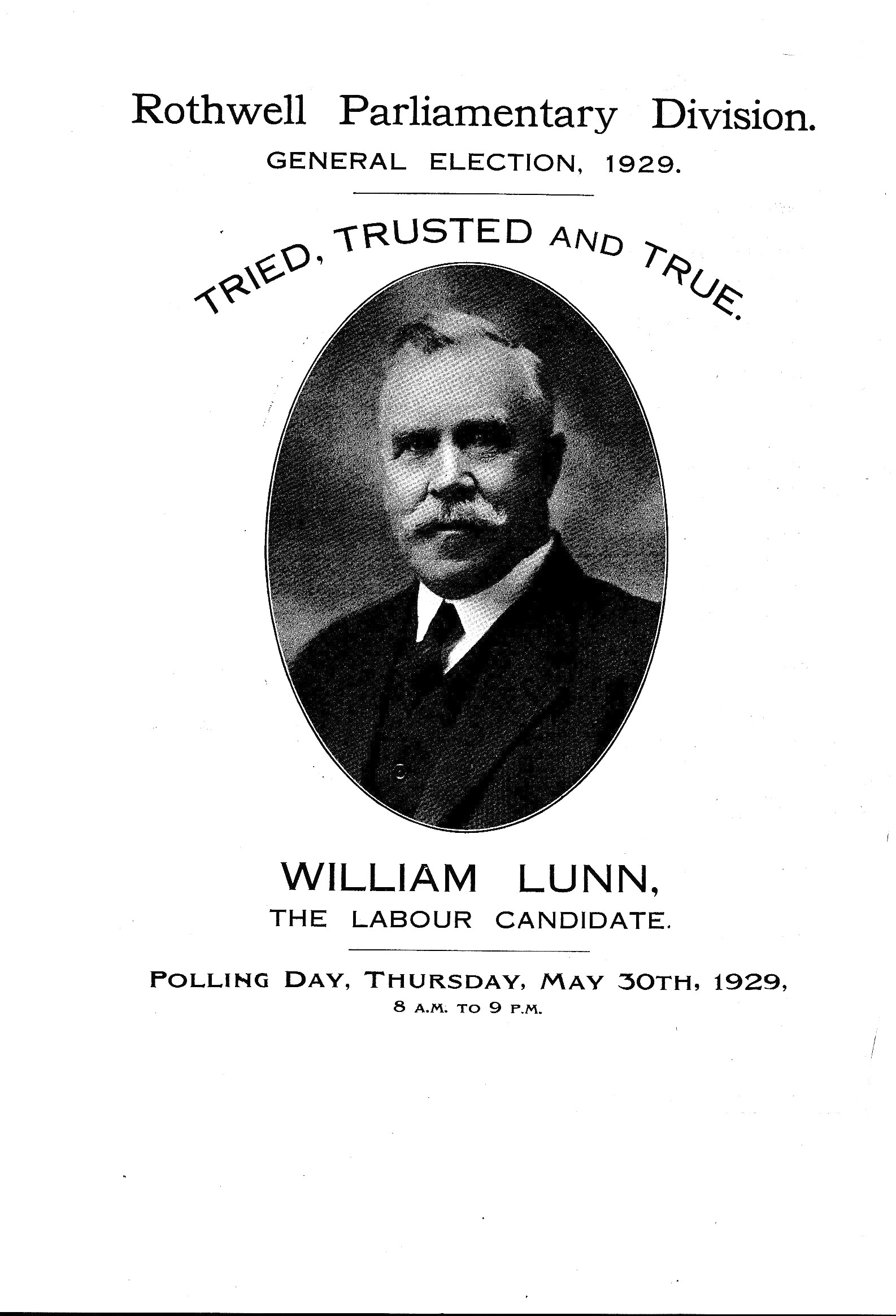
Campaign Flyer 1929 Sheet 1

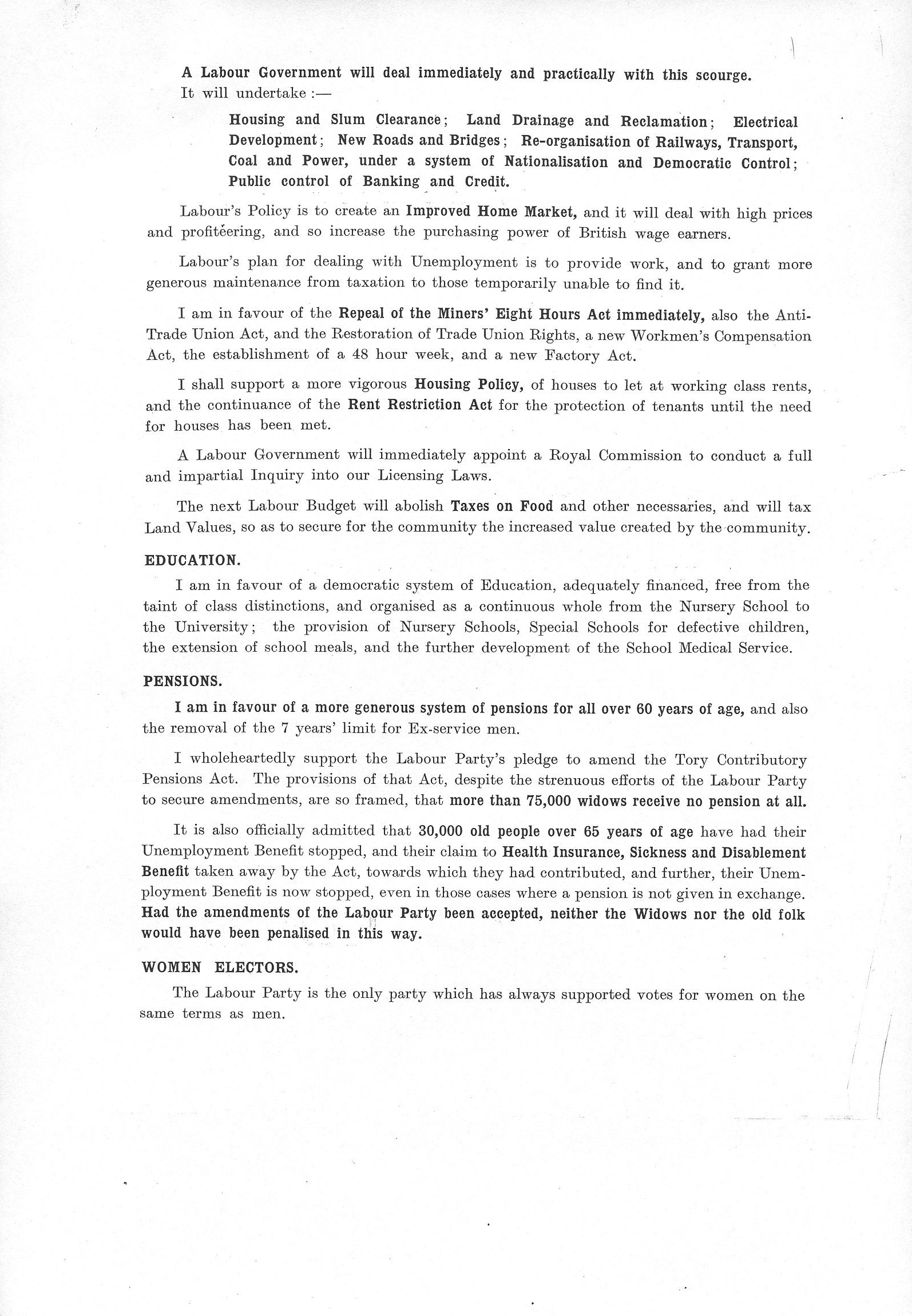
Campaign Flyer 1929 Sheet 2

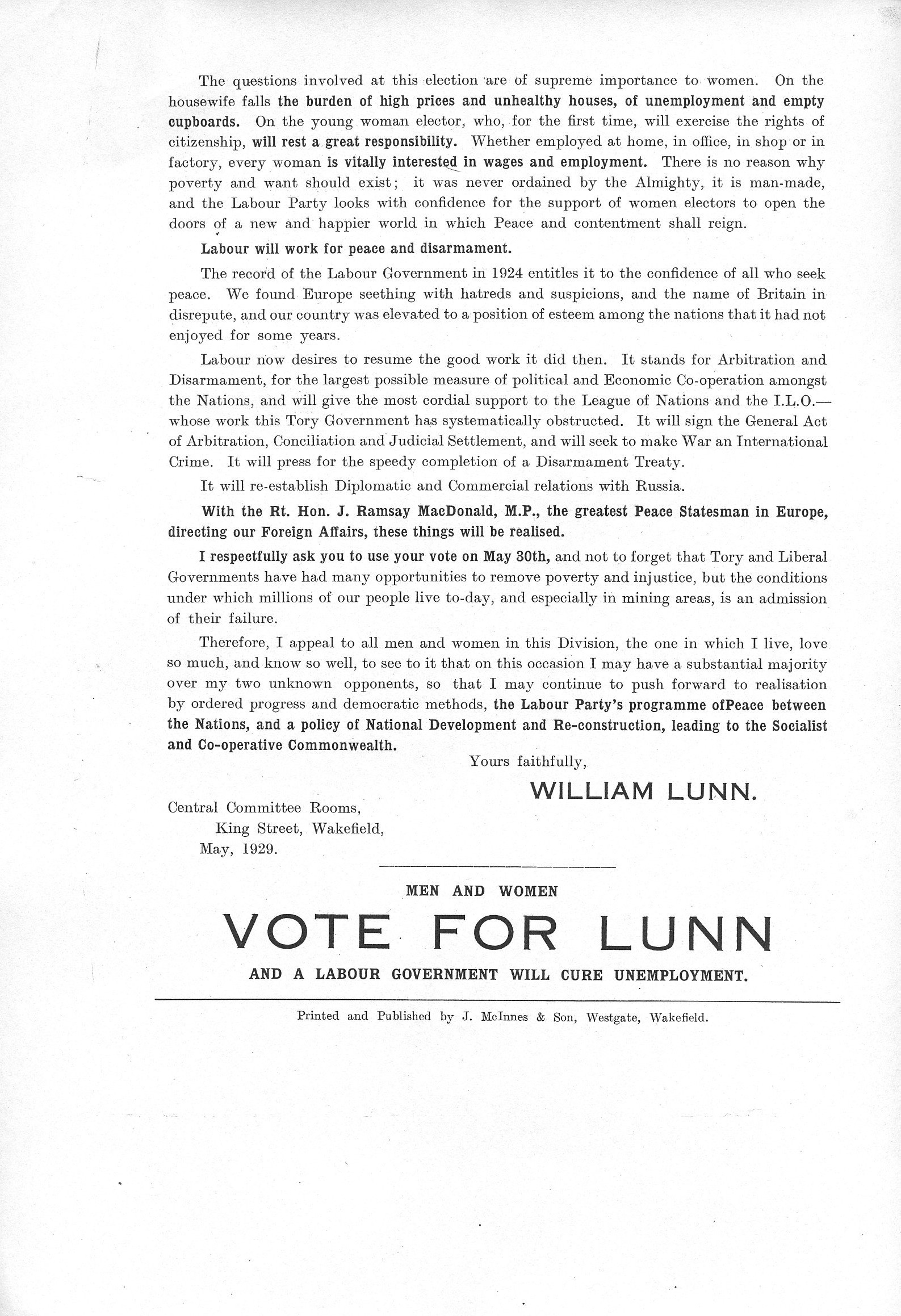
Campaign Flyer 1929 Sheet 3

Parliament of the United Kingdom
New constituency	Member of Parliament for Rothwell; 1918–1942	Succeeded by Thomas Brooks
Political offices
Preceded by Albert Buckley	Secretary for Overseas Trade; 1924	Succeeded by Arthur Samuel
Preceded by William Ormsby-Gore	Under-Secretary of State for the Colonies; 1929	Succeeded by Drummond Shiels
Preceded by Arthur Ponsonby	Under-Secretary of State for Dominion Affairs; 1929–1931	Succeeded by Malcolm MacDonald
