= Thomas Brooks (Labour politician) =

British coal miner and Labour Party politician

Thomas Judson Brooks, MBE, JP (7 July 1880 – 15 February 1958) was a British coal miner and politician who became a Labour Party Member of Parliament. A spiritualist, his main achievement was to lead the successful campaign to repeal the Witchcraft Act 1735.

== Working life ==
Brooks was born on Eastfield Farm at Thurgoland near Barnsley, Yorkshire, where his father was a farmer. He attended Thurgoland Church School, and on leaving instead of following his father into farming, he became a coal miner at Glass Houghton. Active in the Yorkshire Mine Workers' Association, he became Secretary of his branch of the Union in 1911. He was elected as a Labour Party candidate to Castleford Urban District Council in 1914.

== Local politics ==
In 1924 Brooks was appointed Chairman of Wakefield and Pontefract War Pension Committee and made a Justice of the Peace for the West Riding of Yorkshire. In the next year he was elected to the West Riding County Council, on which he remained until 1942 and was elected as a County Alderman in 1940. He was also Chairman of Trustees for Castleford, Normanton and District Hospital. In 1931 he was awarded Membership of the Order of the British Empire for services to the local community.

== Election to Parliament ==
When the Labour MP William Lunn died in May 1942, Brooks won the endorsement of the Yorkshire Miners' Association, and at the Rothwell by-election in August he was elected unopposed as Labour Member of Parliament (MP) for Rothwell. After the end of the war Brooks was appointed to a Committee advising the Speaker on the rebuilding of the Chamber of the House of Commons, which had been destroyed by German bombs in 1941. He was a firm opponent of capital punishment.

== Spiritualism ==
Brooks' most pressing issue was that of Spiritualism, as he was an ardent spiritualist himself. He led delegations from the Spiritualists' National Union to the Home Secretary over what spiritualists believed was heavy-handed policing, and in 1943 obtained a concession that action would only be taken in the most extreme cases of misrepresentation. However, after the prosecution of medium Helen Duncan in 1944, the Spiritualists decided to campaign for a change in the law.

With private member's bills having been suspended during the Second World War and for some years afterwards, it was not until 1950 that an opportunity emerged. Brooks' friend Walter Monslow won a spot in the annual ballot for bills, and Brooks persuaded him to introduce a bill to repeal the Witchcraft Act 1735 (9 Geo. 2 c. 5) and replace it with an act criminalising deliberate deception. With Brooks' guidance, the Fraudulent Mediums Act 1951 (14 & 15 Geo. 6. c. 33) was passed unanimously.

Brooks retired from Parliament at the 1951 general election.

Parliament of the United Kingdom
Preceded by William Lunn	Member of Parliament for Rothwell; 1942–1950	Constituency abolished
Preceded by George Sylvester	Member of Parliament for Normanton; 1950–1951	Succeeded by Albert Roberts
