= Samuel Herbert Wilson =

Irish-born British soldier and colonial administrator (1873–1950)

Brigadier-General Sir Samuel Herbert Wilson GCMG KCB KBE
- Born: 31 October 1873; Dublin, Ireland
- Died: 5 August 1950 (aged 76)

Brigadier-General Sir Samuel Herbert Wilson GCMG KCB KBE (31 October 1873 – 5 August 1950) was a British Army officer and colonial administrator who served as Governor of Trinidad and Tobago between 1921 and 1924, and of Jamaica from 1924 to 1925. He did much to popularise football, offering a Wilson Cup for football.

Wilson was born in Dublin in 1873, the son of Dr. James Wilson. After attending the Royal Military Academy, Woolwich, he entered the Royal Engineers in 1893.

Wilson was appointed a Companion of the Order of St Michael and St George (CMG) in 1914, while serving as Secretary to the Overseas Defence Committee. He was awarded the Croix de Chevalier of the French Legion of Honour in 1916, at which point he was a Major and Brevet Lieutenant-Colonel in the Royal Engineers. He was appointed a Commandeur of the Belgian Ordre de la Couronne in 1918.

He was appointed a Knight Commander of the Order of the British Empire (KBE) in 1921, and promoted to Knight Commander of the Order of St Michael and St George (KCMG) in the 1923 New Year Honours, and to Knight Commander of the Order of the Bath (KCB) in the 1927 Birthday Honours. He was further promoted to Knight Grand Cross of the Order of St Michael and St George (GCMG) in the 1929 New Year Honours.

He married Marie Ada Garbarino Gervers, daughter of Francis Theodore Gervers. His sister-in-law Theodora Chevalier Gervers CBE married Sir Albert Hastings Markham.

== Arms ==
Coat of arms of Samuel Herbert Wilson

Notes
Granted by Sir Nevile Rodwell Wilkinson, 16th March 1937.
Crest
A demi-lion rampant Gules charged with a fleur-de-lus Or.
Escutcheon
Argent a chevron between three mullets Gules on a canton Pean a buck's head couped Proper charged with three bendlets Or.
Motto
Semper Vigilans

Government offices
Preceded by John Robert Chancellor	Governor of Trinidad and Tobago; 1922–1924	Succeeded by Horace Archer Byatt
Preceded by Herbert Bryan, acting	Governor of Jamaica; 1924–1925	Succeeded by Sir Herbert Bryan, acting
Preceded by Sir James Masterton-Smith	Permanent Under-Secretary of State for the Colonies; 1925–1933	Succeeded by Sir John Maffey
