= John Stuart Macpherson =

Governor-General of Nigeria from 1948 to 1955

Sir John Stuart Macpherson GCMG
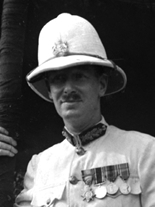
- Macpherson in 1935

1st Governor-General of Nigeria
- In office 1 October 1954 – 15 June 1955
- Monarch: Elizabeth II
- Preceded by: Himself (as Governor)
- Succeeded by: James Wilson Robertson

Governor of Nigeria
- In office 5 February 1948 – 1 October 1954
- Monarchs: George VI; Elizabeth II
- Preceded by: Arthur Richards
- Succeeded by: Himself (as Governor-general)

Personal details
- Born: 25 August 1898 Edinburgh, Scotland
- Died: 5 November 1971 (aged 73) London, England
- Children: Ian Francis Cluny Macpherson
- Education: George Watson's College; University of Edinburgh.
- Occupation: Civil servant

Military service
- Branch/service: British Army
- Unit: Argyll and Sutherland Highlanders

Sir John Stuart Macpherson, GCMG (25 August 1898 – 5 November 1971), was a British colonial administrator who served as the governor of Nigeria from 1948 to 1954, and as governor-general from 1954 to 1955.

== Early life ==
Born in Edinburgh, the son of a hotel manager, Macpherson was educated at George Watson's College and at the University of Edinburgh. In 1917, he was commissioned into the Argyll and Sutherland Highlanders; he was wounded in action on the Western Front, and had to wear a steel corset for the rest of his life.

== Career ==
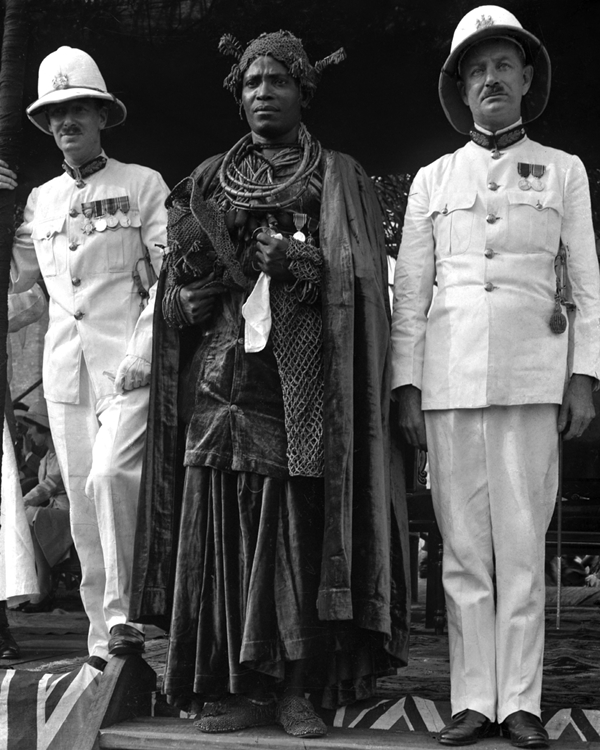
Macpherson (left) with Oba Akenzua II (middle) and the Earl of Plymouth (right), in Benin city, Nigeria, 1935

After World War I, Macpherson entered the Malayan Civil Service. Between 1933 and 1935 he was seconded to the Colonial Office. He was appointed Principal Assistant Secretary in Nigeria in 1937 and Chief Secretary of Palestine in 1939, serving there until 1943. In 1943 he was posted to Washington as Head of British Colonies Supply Mission and joint British Chairman of Anglo-American Caribbean Commission. Between 1945 and 1948 he was Comptroller for Development and Welfare in the West Indies and British co-Chairman of the Caribbean Commission.

In 1948, Macpherson was appointed Governor of Nigeria (Governor-General from 1954), serving in that post until his retirement in 1955; he was succeeded by James Wilson Robertson. As Governor, Macpherson was responsible for the introduction of the 1951 Constitution (unofficially known as the Macpherson Constitution), which provided for "semi-responsible government". He also accelerated the Africanisation of the Nigerian public service.

After his governorship, Macpherson served as the Chairman of the United Nations Visiting Mission to Trust Territories of the Pacific in 1956. The same year, he was appointed Permanent Under-Secretary of State for the Colonies, serving until 1959.

== Honours ==
Macpherson was appointed CMG in 1941, promoted to KCMG in 1945 and GCMG in 1951. On 2 July 1947 he was made an Officer of the Czechoslovak Order of the White Lion.

Government offices
| Preceded by Arthur Richards | Governor-General of Nigeria; 1948–1955 | Succeeded by James Wilson Robertson |
| Preceded by Sir Thomas Lloyd | Permanent Under-Secretary of State for the Colonies; 1956–1959 | Succeeded by Sir Arthur Hilton Poynton |
