= Eastern Group Supply Council =

The Eastern Group Supply Council (EGSC) was a wartime body set up in British India in 1940 to co-ordinate the build-up of war materiel in the British colonies and dominions east of Suez, with the goal of reducing the amount of supplies shipped from the UK. The project was the brainchild of the Viceroy of India, Lord Linlithgow, who envisioned a largely self-sufficient eastern zone of the British Empire and Commonwealth based around co-operation between India and Australia. A central provisions office was set up in Delhi, and local offices were established in Australia, New Zealand, South Africa, East Africa, Southern Rhodesia and the Middle East. Japan's declaration of war on Britain in 1941 and subsequent capture of many of the eastern territories associated with the group, including Burma, Hong Kong and Malaya, undermined the project's success.

== Notes and references ==
Bibliography

- Jackson, Ashley (2006). The British Empire and the Second World War (First ed.). London & New York: Continuum International Publishing Group. ISBN 978-0-8264-4049-5.
- MacDonald, J F (1976) [1950]. The War History of Southern Rhodesia 1939–1945. Volume 2. Bulawayo: Books of Rhodesia. ISBN 9780869201404.
