= Edward John Harding =

British civil servant (1880–1954)

Sir Edward John Harding GCMG KCB (22 March 1880 – 4 October 1954) was a prominent British civil servant and diplomat and former High Commissioner to South Africa.

== Early life ==
Edward John Harding was born in 1880 in Weeley, Essex. He was the son of John and Laura Harding, his father being a vicar. Although born in Essex, the family, consisting of Edward, his parents and his older sisters Eleanor and Evelyn, moved early in his life to Beckenham where his father became the parish vicar. He was educated first at a private preparatory school, the Abbey School in Beckenham, from 1889 to 1893. He then had a brief period at a school in Margate and from 1895 was educated at Dulwich College. From Dulwich he gained a scholarship to study at Hertford College, Oxford.

== Diplomatic career ==
Harding was a career diplomat. He became Secretary of the Royal Commission on the Natural Resources, Trade and Legislation of Certain Portions of His Majesty's Dominions in December 1912 and accompanied the commission on all of its overseas visits: Australia and New Zealand (1913), South Africa (1914) and Canada (1914 and 1916). The long, informal letters he wrote to members of his family during these visits constituted a diary and are held as the "Dominions Royal Commission diary letters" by Cambridge University Library (Royal Commonwealth Society Library).

In 1925, he became both the Deputy Undersecretary of State for Dominion Affairs and Assistant Permanent Undersecretary of State for Dominion Affairs. He then became the Permanent Undersecretary of State for Dominion Affairs in 1930, where he served until 1939. His Assistant Undersecretary was Sir Harry Batterbee, who was married to Harding's sister. Batterbee in 1939 became the British High Commissioner to New Zealand. After leaving the Dominions Office Harding was appointed the British High Commissioner to South Africa in which capacity he served from 1940 until 1941.

== Later life ==
He died at Guildford on 4 October 1954, at the age of 74.

== See also ==
- List of high commissioners of the United Kingdom to South Africa

Government offices
Preceded by Sir Charles Davis	Permanent Undersecretary of State for Dominion Affairs; 1930–1939 (October)	Succeeded by Sir Eric Machtig (acting)
Diplomatic posts
Preceded by William Henry Clark	British High Commissioner to South Africa; 1940–1941	Succeeded by William Ormsby-Gore, 4th Baron Harlech
