= James Masterton-Smith =

British civil servant

Sir James Edward Masterton-Smith KCB (24 August 1878 – 4 May 1938) was a British civil servant who held the position of Permanent Under-Secretary of State for the Colonies.

== Early life and education ==
Masterton-Smith was the son of Edward Smith, a member of the Stock Exchange. He was educated at Harrow School before going up to Hertford College, Oxford.

In 1905 he married Barbara Crosbie-Hill, the eldest daughter of William Samuel James Hill JP and Elizabeth Mary Crosbie, of The Red House in Sevenoaks, Kent. They had one son and one daughter. Barbara died in 1921 in tragic circumstances, and in 1923 Masterton-Smith married Marjorie Marten, the only daughter of Hubert B. Marten of 15 Mallord Street, London.

== Career ==
Masterton-Smith entered the Civil Service in 1901 and worked at the Admiralty for many years. He served as Private Secretary to the Second Sea Lord (1904–1908), Private Secretary to the Permanent Secretary (1908–1910) and Private Secretary to successive First Lords of the Admiralty (Reginald McKenna, Winston Churchill, Arthur Balfour, Edward Carson and Eric Geddes) from 1910 to 1917.

He was Assistant Secretary at the Ministry of Munitions (1917–1919), Assistant Secretary (Additional) at the War Office and the Air Ministry (1919–1920) and Joint Permanent Secretary at the Ministry of Labour (1920–1921).

In 1921, when he was appointed Secretary of State for the Colonies, Churchill offered Masterton-Smith the position of Permanent Under-Secretary, which he accepted.

Masterton-Smith was also a member of the National Whitley Council, representing the Civil Service.

== Honours ==
Masterton-Smith was made a Companion of the Order of the Bath (CB) in 1915 and a Knight of the Order (KCB) in 1919. He was also made an Officer of the Belgian Order of the Crown in 1915 and an Officer of the French Legion of Honour in 1920.

Government offices
Preceded by none	Permanent Secretary of the Ministry of Labour; 1920–1921; With: Sir David Shackleton	Succeeded by Sir Horace Wilson
Preceded by Sir George Fiddes	Permanent Under-Secretary of State for the Colonies; 1921–1925	Succeeded by Sir Samuel Wilson
