= Churchill war ministry =

Government of the United Kingdom from 1940 to 1945

- 1940–1945
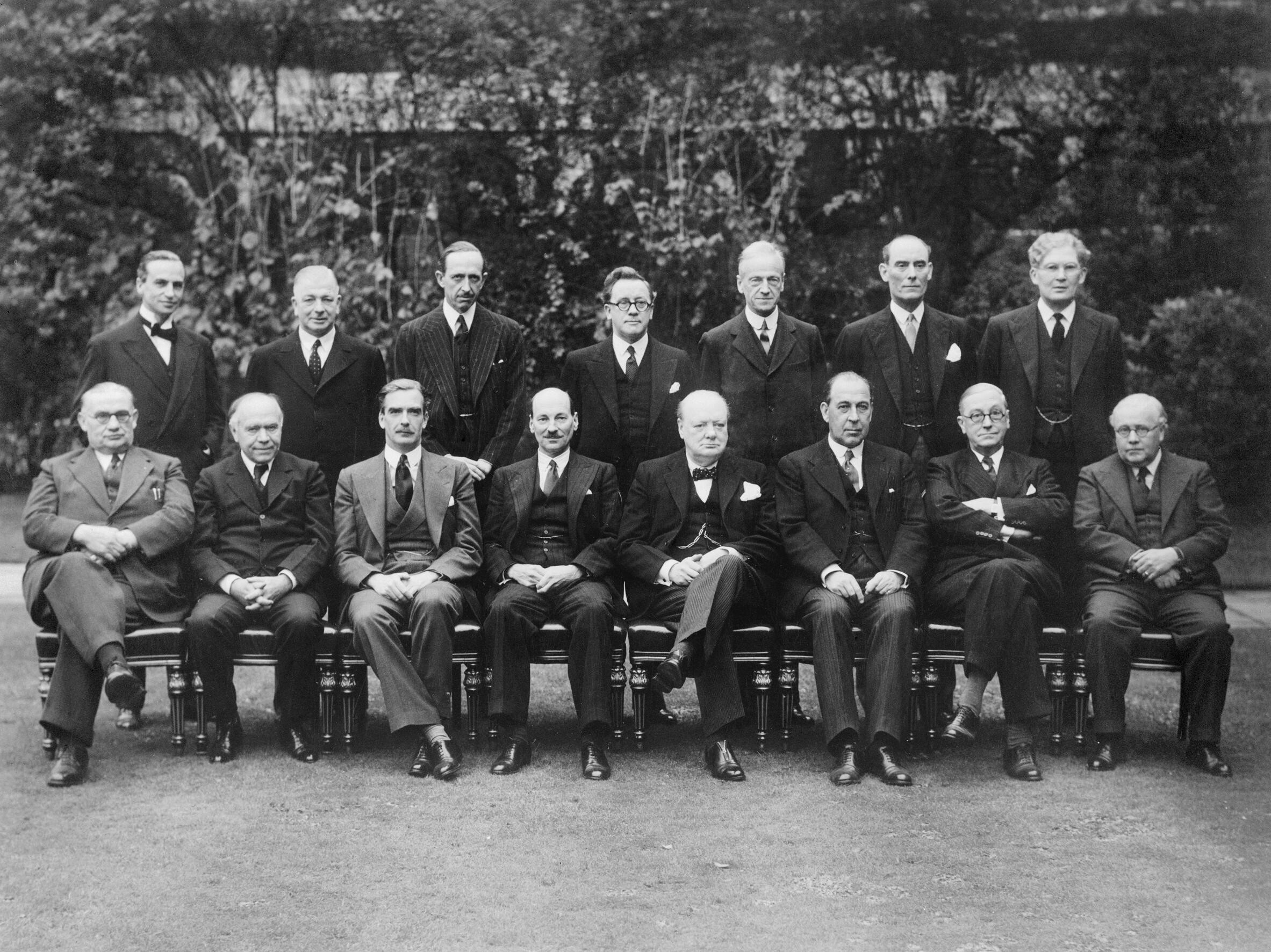
- Churchill's ministers on 24 October 1941.
- Date formed: 10 May 1940
- Date dissolved: 23 May 1945

People and organisations
- Monarch: George VI
- Prime Minister: Winston Churchill
- Deputy Prime Minister: Clement Attlee (1942–1945)
- Total no. of members: 223 appointments
- Member parties: Conservative Party; Labour Party; Liberal National Party; Liberal Party; National Labour
- Status in legislature: Majority (unity government)

History
- Incoming formation: Norway Debate
- Legislature term: 1935–1945
- Predecessor: Chamberlain war ministry
- Successor: Churchill caretaker ministry

The Churchill war ministry was the United Kingdom's unity coalition government for most of the Second World War from 10 May 1940 to 23 May 1945. It was led by Winston Churchill, who was appointed Prime Minister of the United Kingdom by King George VI following the resignation of Neville Chamberlain in the aftermath of the Norway Debate.

At the outset, Churchill formed a five-man war cabinet whose members were Chamberlain, as Lord President of the Council; Clement Attlee, as Lord Privy Seal, and later as Deputy Prime Minister; Viscount Halifax, as Foreign Secretary; and Arthur Greenwood, as a Minister without portfolio. Although the original war cabinet was limited to five members, in practice they were augmented by the service chiefs and ministers who attended the majority of meetings. The cabinet changed in size and membership as the war progressed. There were significant additions later in 1940 when it was increased to eight. Churchill, Attlee, and Greenwood were joined by Ernest Bevin, as Minister of Labour and National Service; Anthony Eden, as Foreign Secretary, replacing Halifax who had been sent to Washington as Ambassador to the United States; Lord Beaverbrook, as Minister of Aircraft Production; Sir Kingsley Wood, as Chancellor of the Exchequer; and Sir John Anderson, as Lord President of the Council, replacing Chamberlain who had died in November (Anderson later became Chancellor following Wood's death in September 1943).

The coalition was dissolved in May 1945, following the final defeat of Germany, when the Labour Party decided to withdraw in order to prepare for a general election. Churchill, who was the leader of the Conservative Party, was asked by the King to form a new, essentially Conservative, government. It was known as the Churchill caretaker ministry, and managed the country's affairs until completion of the general election on 26 July that year.

== Background ==
Neville Chamberlain

The 1935 general election had resulted in a Conservative victory with a substantial majority, and Stanley Baldwin became Prime Minister. In May 1937, Baldwin retired and was succeeded by Neville Chamberlain, who continued Baldwin's foreign policy of appeasement in the face of German, Italian and Japanese aggression. Having signed the Munich Agreement with Adolf Hitler in 1938, Chamberlain became alarmed by the dictator's continuing aggression and, in March 1939, signed the Anglo-Polish military alliance which supposedly guaranteed British support for Poland if attacked. Chamberlain issued the declaration of war against Germany on 3 September 1939, and formed a war cabinet which included Winston Churchill (out of office since June 1929) as First Lord of the Admiralty.

Dissatisfaction with Chamberlain's leadership became widespread in the spring of 1940 after Germany successfully invaded Norway. In response, the House of Commons held the Norway Debate from 7 to 9 May. At the end of the second day, the Labour opposition forced a division which was, in effect, a motion of no confidence in Chamberlain. The government's nominal majority of 213 was reduced to 81, still a victory but nevertheless a shattering blow for Chamberlain.

== 9–31 May 1940—creation of a new government ==
=== 9 May—Chamberlain considers his options ===
On Thursday, 9 May, Chamberlain attempted to form a National Coalition government. In talks at Downing Street with Viscount Halifax and Churchill, he indicated that he was quite ready to resign if that was necessary for Labour to enter such a government. Labour Party leader Clement Attlee and his deputy Arthur Greenwood then joined the meeting. When asked, they indicated that they must first consult Labour's National Executive Committee, which at that moment was in Bournemouth to prepare for the party's annual conference. It was unlikely that they could serve in a government led by Chamberlain; but they probably would be able to serve under another Conservative.

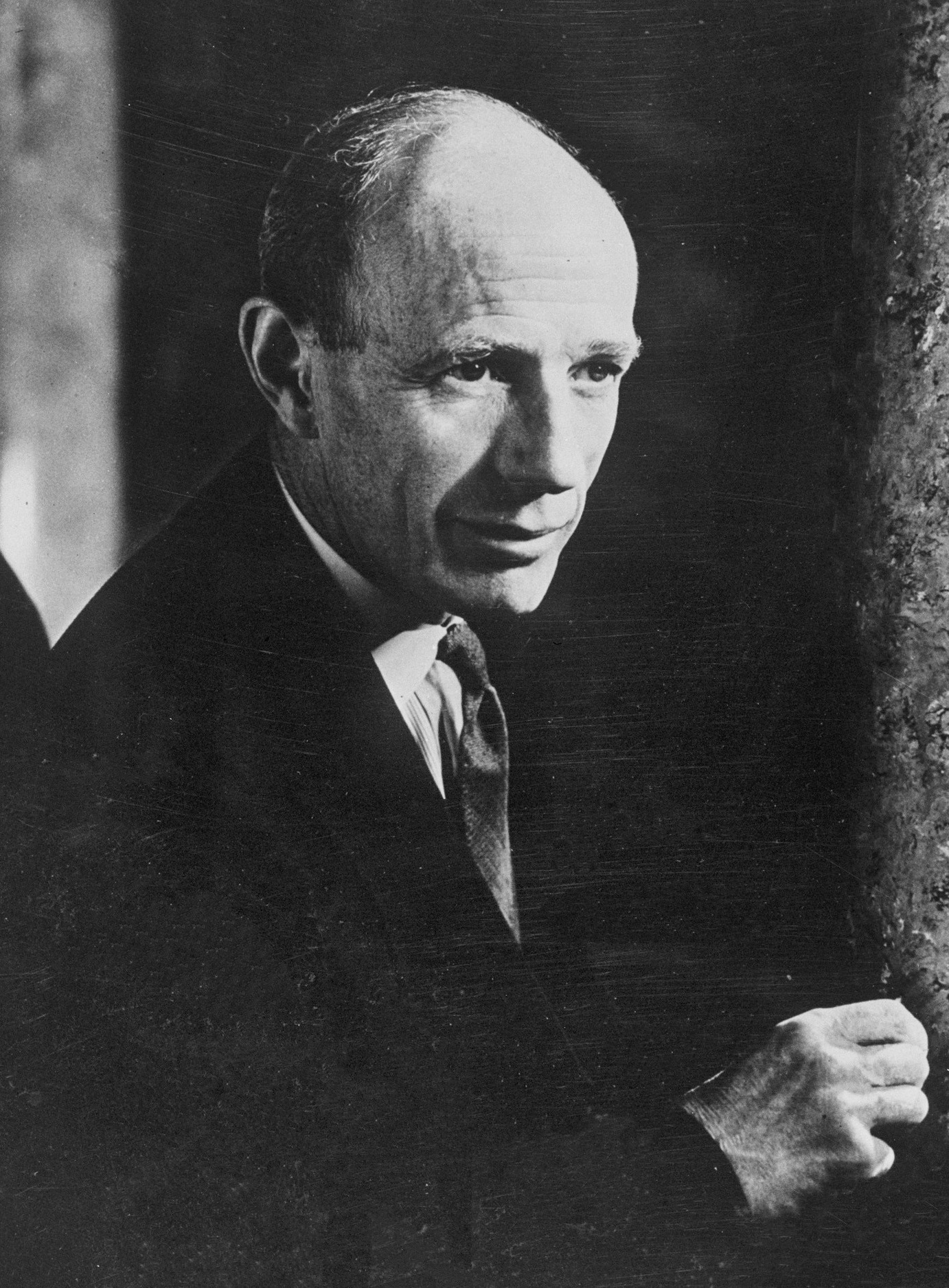
Viscount Halifax

After Attlee and Greenwood left, Chamberlain asked whom he should recommend to the King as his successor. The version of events given by Churchill is that Chamberlain's preference for Halifax was obvious (Churchill implies that a spat between himself and the Labour benches the previous night had something to do with that); there was a long silence which Halifax eventually broke by saying he did not believe he could lead the government effectively as a member of the House of Lords instead of the House of Commons. Churchill's version has an incorrect date, and he fails to mention the presence of David Margesson, the government Chief Whip.

Halifax's account omits the dramatic pause, and gives an additional reason: "PM said I was the man mentioned as most acceptable. I said it would be hopeless position. If I was not in charge of the war (operations) and if I didn't lead in the House, I should be a cypher. I thought Winston was a better choice. Winston did not demur." According to Halifax, Margesson then confirmed that the House of Commons had been veering towards Churchill.

In a letter to Churchill written that night, Bob Boothby asserted that parliamentary opinion was hardening against Halifax, claiming in a postscript that according to Liberal MP Clement Davies, "Attlee & Greenwood are unable to distinguish between the PM & Halifax and are not prepared to serve under the latter". Davies (who thought Chamberlain should go, and be replaced by Churchill) had lunched with Attlee and Greenwood (and argued his case) shortly before they saw Chamberlain. Labour's Hugh Dalton, however, noted in his diary entry for 9 May that he had spoken with Attlee, who "agrees with my preference for Halifax over Churchill, but we both think either would be tolerable".

=== 10 May—Churchill succeeds Chamberlain ===
On the morning of Friday, 10 May, Germany invaded the Netherlands, Belgium, and Luxembourg. Chamberlain initially felt that a change of government at such a time would be inappropriate, but upon being given confirmation that Labour would not serve under him, he announced to the war cabinet his intention to resign. Scarcely more than three days after he had opened the debate, Chamberlain went to Buckingham Palace to resign as Prime Minister. Despite resigning as PM, however, he continued to be the leader of the Conservative Party. He explained to the King why Halifax, whom the King thought the obvious candidate, did not want to become Prime Minister. The King then sent for Churchill, and asked him to form a new government; according to Churchill, there was no stipulation that it must be a coalition government.

Neville Chamberlain resigns
Neville Chamberlain speaks to the nation following his resignation as Prime Minister, 10 May 1940.

At 21:00 on 10 May, Chamberlain announced the change of leadership over the BBC. Churchill's first act as PM was to ask Attlee and Greenwood to come and see him at Admiralty House. Next, he wrote to Chamberlain to thank him for his promised support. He then began to construct his coalition cabinet with the assistance of Attlee and Greenwood. Their conference went on into the early hours of Saturday, and they reached a broad agreement on the composition of the new war cabinet, subject to Labour Party confirmation. Attlee and Greenwood were confident of securing this on Saturday after Churchill promised that more than a third of government positions would be offered to Labour members, including some of the key posts.

=== 11/12 May—formation of the national government ===
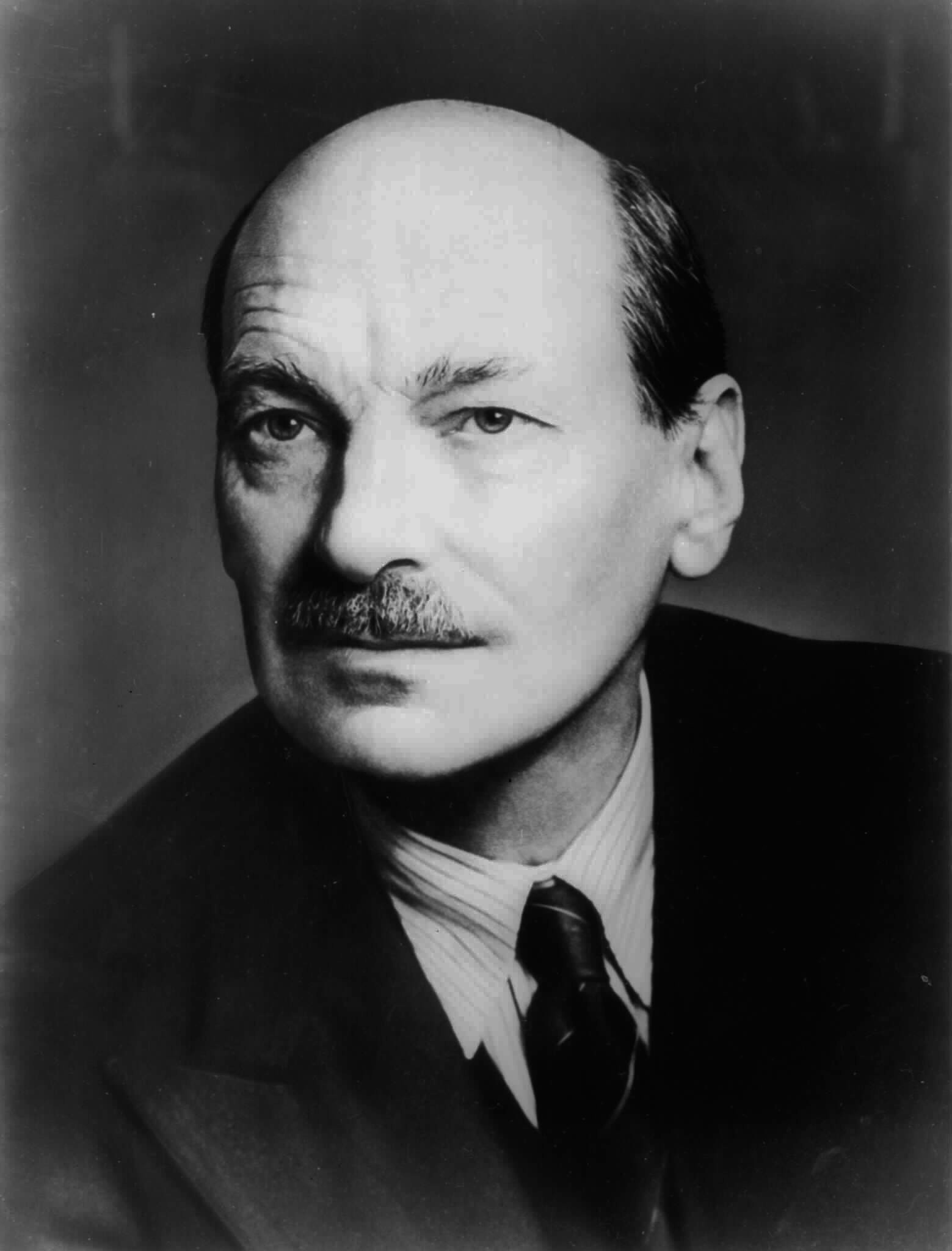
Clement Attlee

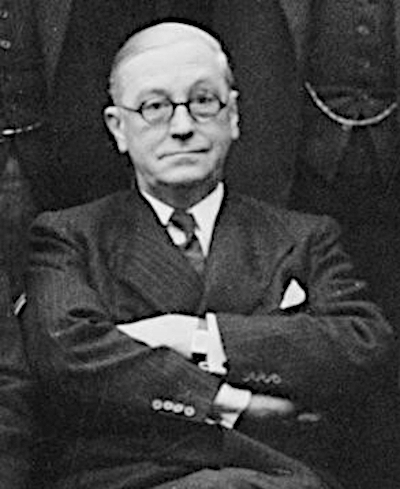
Arthur Greenwood

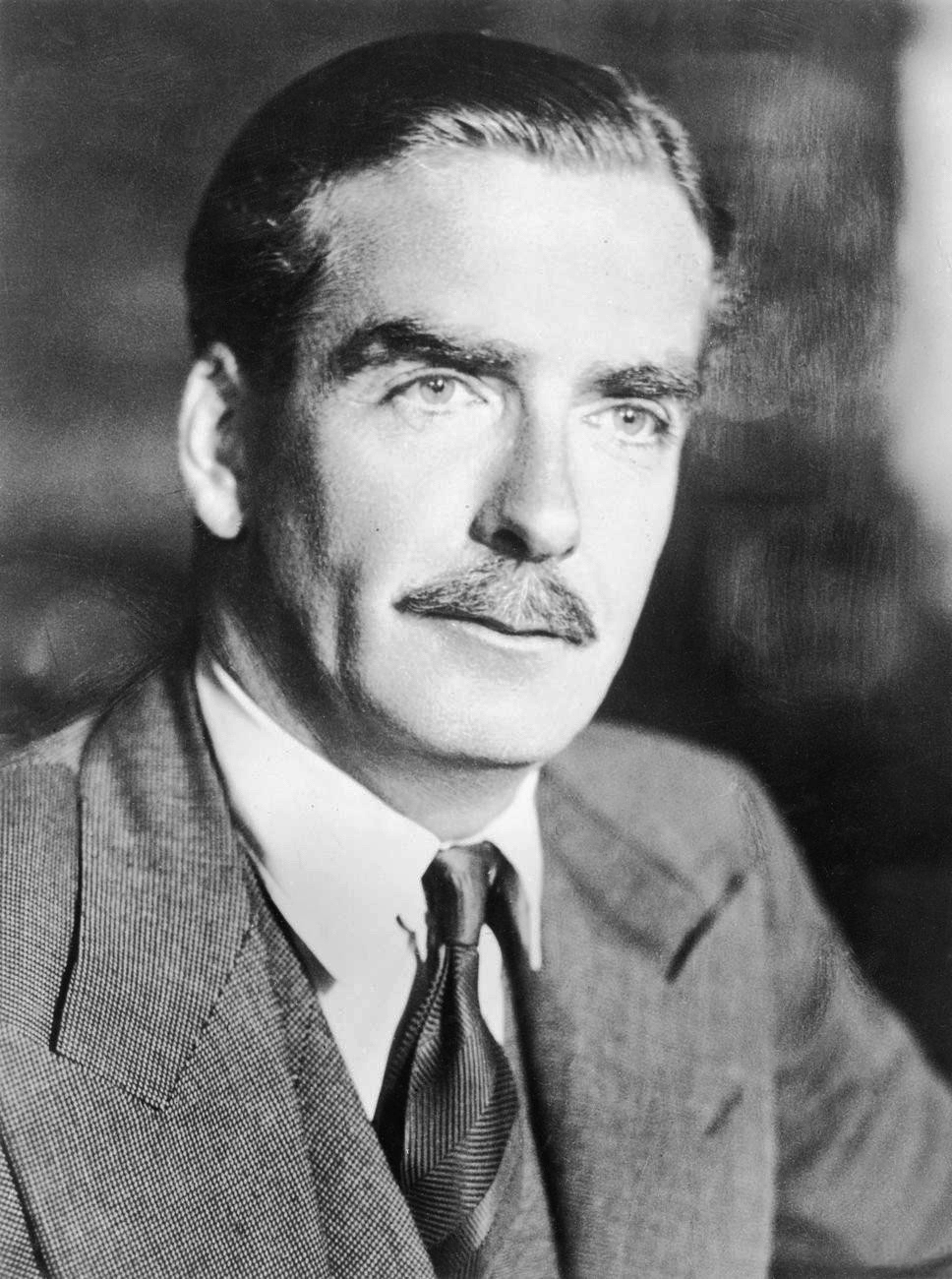
Anthony Eden

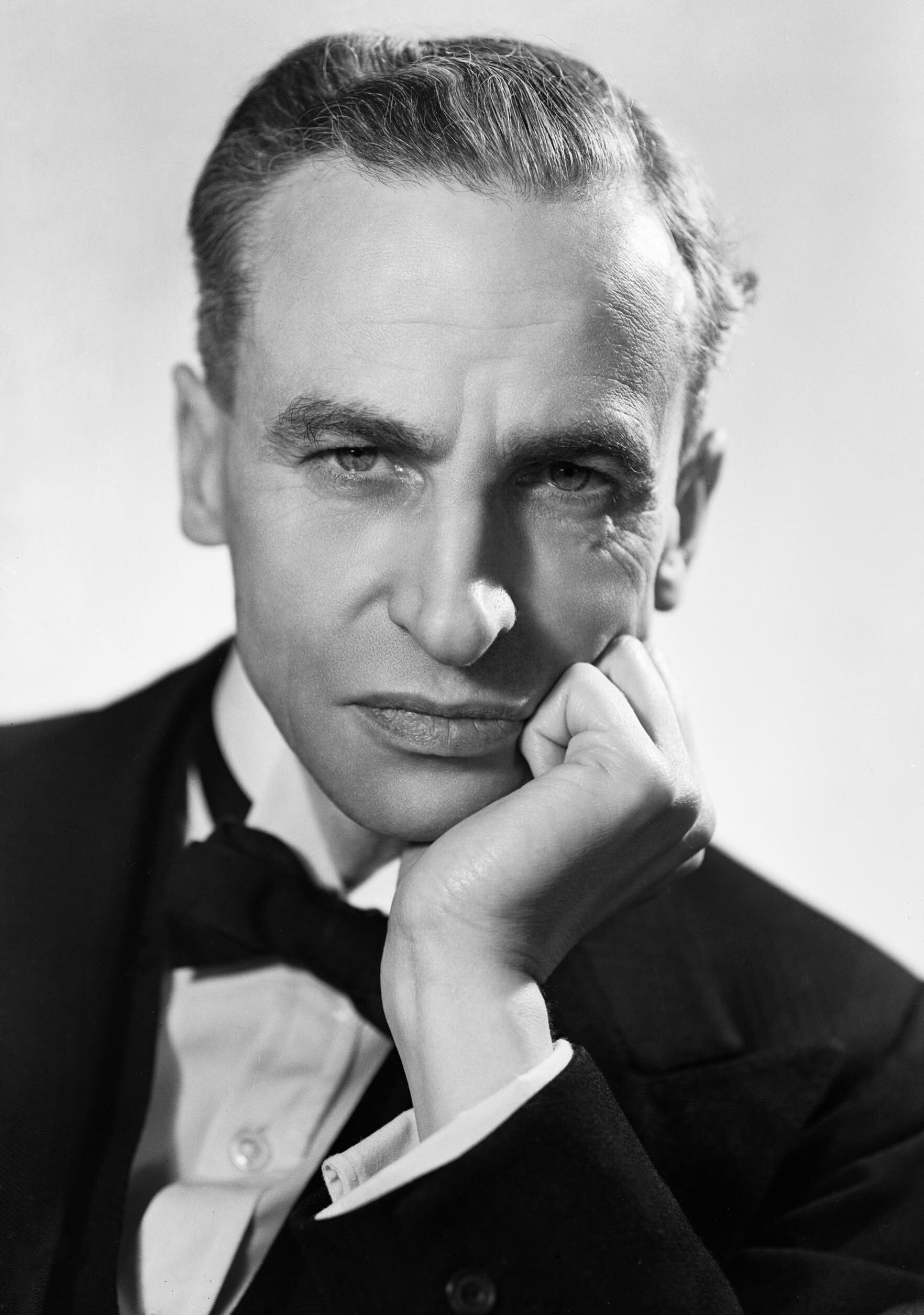
Sir Archibald Sinclair

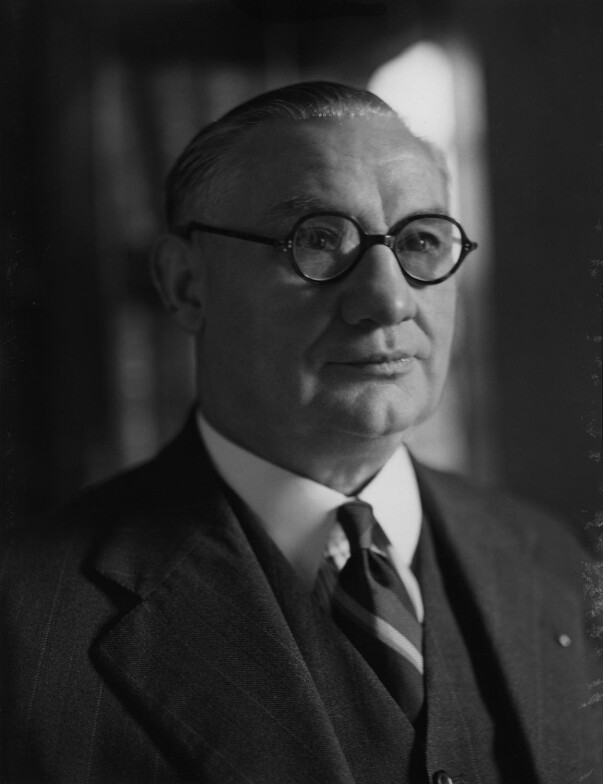
Ernest Bevin

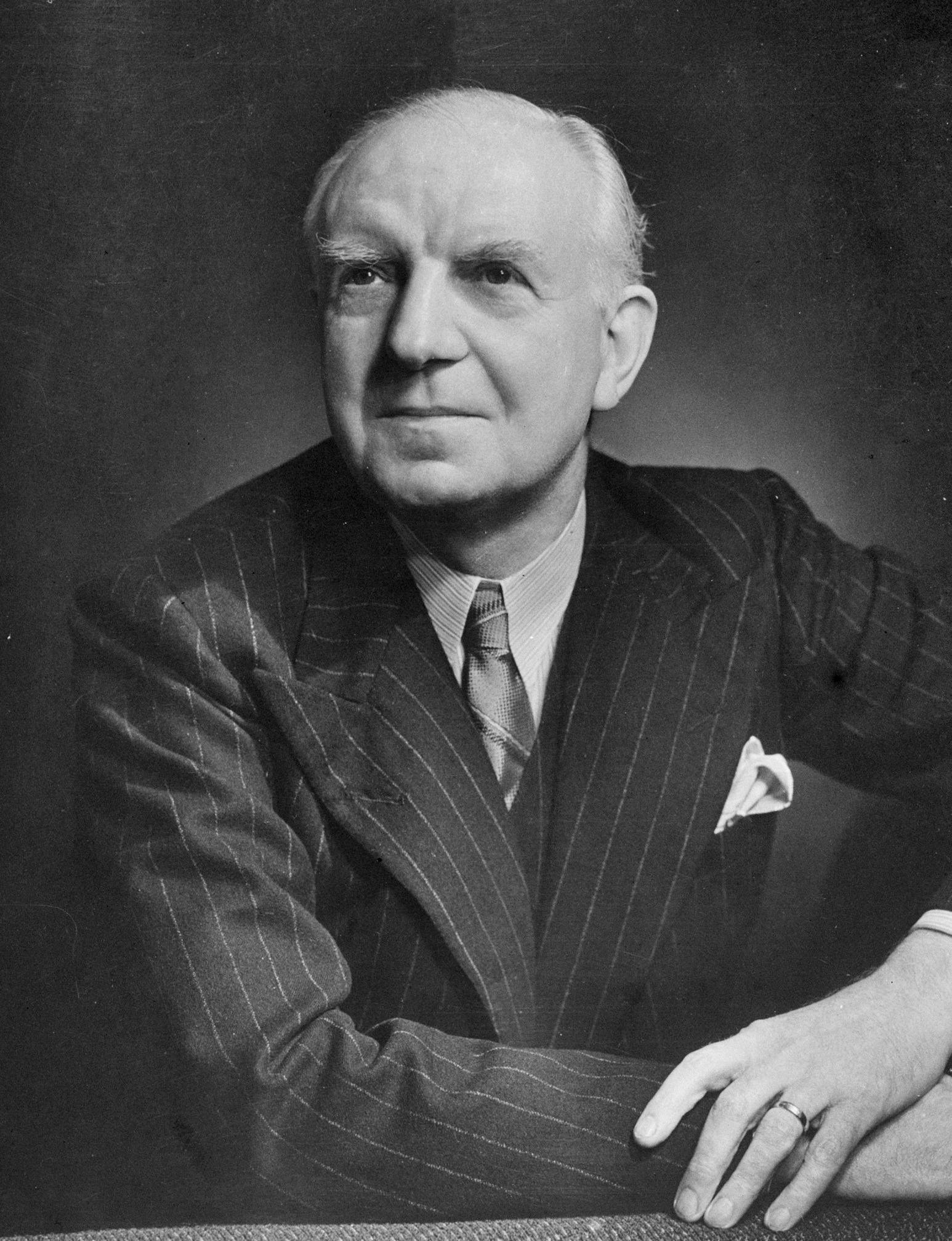
Lord Woolton

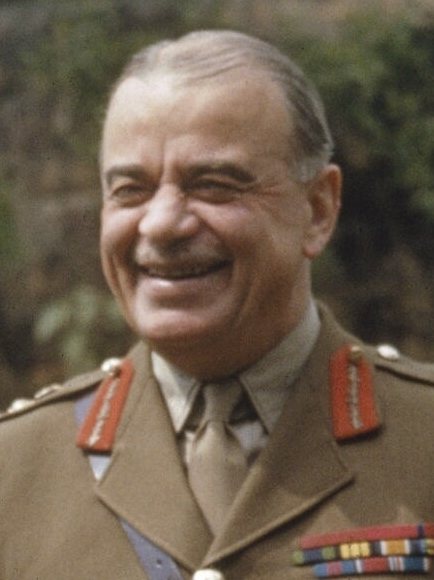
General Sir Hastings Ismay

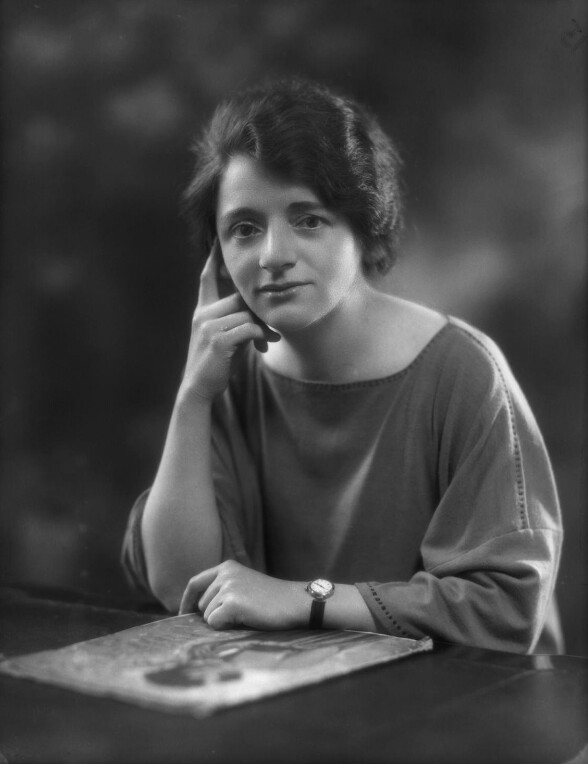
Ellen Wilkinson

On Saturday, 11 May, the Labour Party agreed to join a national government under Churchill's leadership, and he was able to confirm his war cabinet. In his biography of Churchill, Roy Jenkins described the Churchill cabinet as one "for winning", while the former Chamberlain cabinet was one "for losing". Labour leader Clement Attlee relinquished his official role as Leader of the Opposition to become Lord Privy Seal (until 19 February 1942 when he was appointed Deputy Prime Minister). Arthur Greenwood, Labour's deputy leader, was appointed a Minister without portfolio.

There was no de facto Leader of the Opposition from 11 May 1940 until Attlee resumed the role on 23 May 1945. The Labour Party appointed an acting Leader of the Opposition whose job, although he was in effect a member of the national government, was to ensure the continued functionality of the House of Commons. Constitutional convention in the Commons requires someone, even a member of the government, to fill the role even if there is no actual opposition. The first acting leader was Hastings Lees-Smith, the MP for Keighley, who died in office on 18 December 1941. He was briefly succeeded by Frederick Pethick-Lawrence, and then by Arthur Greenwood, who had left the war cabinet, from 22 February 1942 until 23 May 1945.

The main problem for Churchill as he became PM was that he was not the leader of the majority Conservative Party and, needing its support, was obliged to include Chamberlain in the war cabinet. This was not to Labour's liking. Initially, Churchill proposed to appoint Chamberlain as both Leader of the House of Commons and Chancellor of the Exchequer. Attlee objected, and Churchill decided to appoint Chamberlain as Lord President of the Council. The fifth member of the war cabinet was Halifax, who retained his position as Foreign Secretary. Instead of Chamberlain, Sir Kingsley Wood became Chancellor but, until 3 October 1940, he was not a member of the war cabinet.

Churchill appointed himself as Leader of the House (it was normal procedure until 1942 for a Prime Minister in the Commons to lead the House), and created for himself the new role of Minister of Defence, so that he would be permanent chair of the Cabinet Defence Committee (CDC), Operations, which included the three service ministers, the three Chiefs of Staff (CoS) and other ministers, especially Attlee, and experts as and when required. The CDC was established by Churchill as soon as he took office. It was the key organisation through which the government prosecuted the war, especially in 1940 and 1941. From 1942, as the tide of war began to turn in favour of the Allies, the importance of the CDC was reduced, and its meetings became fewer as its work was increasingly delegated or raised at conferences.

Anthony Eden became Secretary of State for War (until December 1940); Labour's A. V. Alexander succeeded Churchill as First Lord of the Admiralty; and the Liberal Party leader, Sir Archibald Sinclair, became Secretary of State for Air. The CoS at this time were Admiral Sir Dudley Pound, the First Sea Lord; Air Marshal Sir Cyril Newall, the Chief of the Air Staff; and Field Marshal Sir Edmund Ironside, the Chief of the Imperial General Staff (CIGS). (On 27 May, Ironside was replaced at Churchill's request by his deputy Field Marshal Sir John Dill, and Ironside became Commander-in-Chief, Home Forces). The CoS continued to hold their own Chiefs of Staff Committee (CSC) meetings. The CDC enabled Churchill to have direct contact with them so that strategic concerns could be addressed with due regard to civil matters and foreign affairs.

In addition, for the ministry's whole term, both the war cabinet and the CDC were regularly attended by Sir Edward Bridges, the Cabinet Secretary; General Sir Hastings Ismay, Chief of Staff to the Minister of Defence; and Major General Sir Leslie Hollis, Secretary to the Chiefs of Staff Committee. Bridges was rarely absent from war cabinet sessions. He was appointed by Chamberlain—as a senior civil servant, he was not a political appointee—in August 1938, and he remained in situ until 1946. Churchill later described Bridges as "an extremely competent and tireless worker". Ismay's role, technically, was Secretary of the CSC but he was in fact Churchill's chief staff officer and military adviser throughout the war. Hollis was Secretary to the CoS Committee, also for the duration, and he additionally served as senior assistant secretary to Bridges in the war cabinet office.

=== 13 May—Churchill's first speech as Prime Minister ===
By Monday, 13 May, most of the senior government posts were filled. That day was Whit Monday, normally a bank holiday but cancelled by the incoming government. A specially convened sitting of the House of Commons was held and Churchill spoke for the first time as prime minister:

I beg to move, that this House welcomes the formation of a Government representing the united and inflexible resolve of the nation to prosecute the war with Germany to a victorious conclusion.

He explained that a war cabinet of five members had been formed to represent the unity of the nation with all three main party leaders agreeing to serve either in the war cabinet or in high executive office. Churchill was hoping to complete all ministerial appointments by the end of the 14th. He announced an adjournment of Commons business until the 21st and apologised for making only a short address for the present. Even so, his speech has become one of his most famous because he concluded with his statement of intent:

I would say to the House, as I said to those who have joined this Government: "I have nothing to offer but blood, toil, tears and sweat". We have before us an ordeal of the most grievous kind. We have before us many, many long months of struggle and of suffering. You ask, what is our policy? I will say: It is to wage war, by sea, land and air, with all our might and with all the strength that God can give us; to wage war against a monstrous tyranny never surpassed in the dark, lamentable catalogue of human crime. That is our policy. You ask, what is our aim? I can answer in one word: It is victory, victory at all costs, victory in spite of all terror, victory, however long and hard the road may be; for without victory, there is no survival. Let that be realised; no survival for the British Empire, no survival for all that the British Empire has stood for, no survival for the urge and impulse of the ages, that mankind will move forward towards its goal. But I take up my task with buoyancy and hope. I feel sure that our cause will not be suffered to fail among men. At this time I feel entitled to claim the aid of all, and I say, "Come then, let us go forward together with our united strength".

In reply, Hastings Lees-Smith as acting Leader of the Opposition announced that Labour would vote for the motion to assure the country of a unified political front. After several other members had spoken, including David Lloyd George and Stafford Cripps, the House divided on the question: "That this House welcomes the formation of a Government representing the united and inflexible resolve of the nation to prosecute the war with Germany to a victorious conclusion". 381 members voted "aye" in favour of the motion and, apart from the two tellers for the "noes", the wartime coalition was endorsed unanimously.

Meanwhile, the Labour Party's conference had gone ahead as planned. On the 13th, Attlee spoke to confirm that the party was now in coalition with the Conservatives and Liberals as a national government. He told the conference that: "We are trying to form a government that should rally all the nation and set forth the energies of the people". He added that he had "not the slightest doubt about our victory".

=== 14–17 May—completion of government membership ===
Apart from a handful of junior appointments such as royal household positions, Churchill completed the construction of his government by the end of his first week in office. Only two women were appointed to government positions – Florence Horsbrugh, who had previously been a Conservative backbench MP, became Parliamentary Secretary to the Ministry of Health on 15 May; and Labour's Ellen Wilkinson, the most left-wing member of Churchill's ministry, became Parliamentary Secretary to the Ministry of Pensions on the 17th.

=== 18 May to 4 June—war cabinet crisis ===
The war situation in Europe became increasingly critical for the Allies as the Wehrmacht overran northern France and the Low Countries through May, culminating in the siege of Dunkirk and the desperate need to evacuate the British Expeditionary Force by Operation Dynamo. In the war cabinet, Churchill faced a serious challenge by Halifax to his direction of the war. Halifax wanted to sue for peace by asking Benito Mussolini to broker a treaty between the British government and Hitler. Churchill wanted to continue the war. Attlee and Greenwood supported Churchill while Chamberlain, still the leader of the majority Conservative Parliamentary Party, remained neutral for several days until finally aligning himself with Churchill's resolve to fight on.

== June 1940 to May 1945 ==
=== 5 June 1940 to 30 April 1941 ===
- 2 August 1940: Lord Beaverbrook, Minister of Aircraft Production, joins the war cabinet.
- 22 September 1940: Resignation of Neville Chamberlain for health reasons (terminal colon cancer).
- 3 October 1940: Sir John Anderson succeeds Chamberlain as Lord President and joins the war cabinet. Sir Kingsley Wood, the Chancellor of the Exchequer, and Ernest Bevin, the Minister of Labour, also enter the war cabinet. Lord Halifax assumes the additional job of Leader of the House of Lords.
- 25 October 1940: Air Marshal Sir Cyril Newall is persuaded to take retirement and is replaced by Sir Charles Portal, who has been C-in-C of Bomber Command.
- 9 November 1940: Death of Neville Chamberlain.
- 22 December 1940: Anthony Eden succeeds Lord Halifax as Foreign Secretary (Eden holds the post until 26 July 1945) and joins the war cabinet as its eighth member. Halifax becomes Ambassador to the United States. His successor as Leader of the House of Lords is not in the war cabinet.
- 30 April 1941: Beaverbrook ceases to be Minister of Aircraft Production, but remains in the war cabinet as Minister of State (appointed 1 May 1941). His successor is not in the war cabinet.

=== 1 May 1941 to 30 April 1942 ===
- 29 June 1941: Beaverbrook becomes Minister of Supply, remaining in the war cabinet. Oliver Lyttelton enters the war cabinet as Minister-Resident for the Middle East.
- 25 December 1941: Sir John Dill is replaced as CIGS by Field Marshal Sir Alan Brooke. Dill becomes Chief of the British Joint Staff Mission in Washington, DC. Brooke has been General Ironside's successor as C-in-C, Home Forces, since July 1940.
- 4 February 1942: Beaverbrook resigns from Supply and is appointed Minister of War Production; his successor as Minister of Supply is not in the war cabinet.
- 15 February 1942: Attlee relinquishes the Lord Privy Seal to become Secretary of State for Dominion Affairs, the first time this office is represented in the war cabinet.
- 19 February 1942: Attlee is appointed Deputy Prime Minister with general responsibility for domestic affairs. Beaverbrook again resigns but no replacement as Minister of War Production is appointed for the moment. Sir Stafford Cripps succeeds Attlee as Lord Privy Seal and takes over the position of Leader of the House of Commons to reduce Churchill's workload. Sir Kingsley Wood leaves the war cabinet, though remaining Chancellor of the Exchequer.
- 22 February 1942: Arthur Greenwood leaves the war cabinet to assume the role of Leader of the Opposition, necessary for House of Commons functionality, till 23 May 1945.
- 12 March 1942: Oliver Lyttelton fills the vacant position of Minister of Production ("War" is dropped from the title). Richard Casey succeeds Lyttelton as Minister-Resident for the Middle East.

=== 1 May 1942 to 30 April 1943 ===
- 22 November 1942: Cripps retires as Lord Privy Seal and Leader of the House of Commons and leaves the war cabinet. His successor as Lord Privy Seal (Viscount Cranborne) is not in the Cabinet, and Eden takes the additional position of Leader of the House of Commons. The Home Secretary, Herbert Morrison, enters the Cabinet.

=== 1 May 1943 to 30 April 1944 ===
- 21 September 1943: Death of Sir Kingsley Wood.
- 24 September 1943: Anderson succeeds Wood as Chancellor of the Exchequer, remaining in the war cabinet.
- 24 September 1943: Attlee leaves Dominions to succeed Anderson as Lord President. Except during Attlee's tenure, Dominions is not a war cabinet portfolio. Attlee remains Deputy PM and Lord President until termination of the ministry on 23 May 1945.
- 15 October 1943: Due to failing health, Sir Dudley Pound resigns as First Sea Lord. He dies six days later. He is succeeded by Admiral of the Fleet Sir Andrew Cunningham, who has been Commander-in-Chief of the Mediterranean Fleet.
- 11 November 1943: Lord Woolton joins the war cabinet as Minister of Reconstruction.
- 14 January 1944: Lord Moyne replaces Richard Casey as Minister-Resident for the Middle East.

=== 1 May 1944 to 22 May 1945 ===
- 6 June 1944: D-Day.
- 6 November 1944: Lord Moyne is assassinated in Cairo by Jewish militants. His successor is not in the war cabinet.
- 25 April 1945: Attlee, Eden, Florence Horsbrugh, and Ellen Wilkinson are Britain's delegates at the San Francisco Conference.
- 30 April 1945: Death of Adolf Hitler.
- 8 May 1945: V-E Day. The war cabinet members at the time are Churchill, Attlee, Anderson, Bevin, Eden, Lyttelton, Morrison, and Woolton.

== 23 May 1945—End of the ministry ==
In October 1944, Churchill had proposed to the Commons that the current Parliament, which had begun in 1935, should be extended by a further year. He correctly anticipated the defeat of Germany in the spring of 1945 but he did not expect the end of the Far East war until 1946. He therefore recommended that the end of the European war should be "a pointer (to) fix the date of the (next) General Election".

Attlee, along with Eden, Horsbrugh, and Wilkinson, attended the San Francisco Conference and had returned to London by 18 May 1945 (ten days after V-E Day) when he met Churchill to discuss the future of the coalition. Attlee, in agreement with Churchill, wanted it to continue until after the Japanese surrender but he discovered that others in the Labour Party, especially Morrison and Bevin, wanted an election in October after Parliament ended. On 20 May, Attlee attended his party conference and found that opinion was against him so he informed Churchill that Labour must leave the coalition.

On 23 May, Labour left the coalition to begin their general election campaign. Churchill resigned as prime minister but the King asked him to form a new government, known as the Churchill caretaker ministry, until the election was held in July. Churchill agreed and his new ministry, essentially a Conservative one, held office for the next two months until it was replaced by Attlee's Labour government after their election victory.

== Government members ==
=== Ministers who held war cabinet membership, 10 May 1940 – 23 May 1945 ===
A total of sixteen ministers held war cabinet membership at various times in Churchill's ministry. There were five at the outset of whom two, Churchill and Attlee, served throughout the ministry's entire term. Bevin, Morrison and Wood were appointed to the war cabinet while retaining offices that had originally been outer cabinet portfolios. Anderson and Eden were promoted to the war cabinet from other offices after their predecessors, Chamberlain and Halifax, had left the government; similarly, Casey was brought in after Lyttelton switched portfolio and Moyne was appointed to replace Casey. Beaverbrook, Lyttelton and Woolton were brought in to fill new offices that were created to address current priorities. Greenwood was an original member with no portfolio and was not replaced when he assumed the acting leadership of the Opposition. Cripps was brought in as an extra member to reduce the workloads of Churchill and Attlee.

=== Senior government ministries and offices, 10 May 1940 – 23 May 1945 ===
This table lists cabinet-level ministries and offices during the Churchill administration. Most of these were portfolios in the "outer cabinet" and outside the war cabinet, although some were temporarily included in the war cabinet, as indicated by bold highlighting of the ministers concerned. Focus here is upon the ministerial offices. Some ministries, such as Foreign Secretary, were in the war cabinet throughout the entire administration whereas others like Lord Privy Seal, Chancellor of the Exchequer, and Home Secretary were sometimes in the war cabinet and sometimes not, depending on priorities at the time. A number of ministries were created by Churchill in response to wartime needs. Some of the ministers retained offices that they held in former administrations and their notes include the date of their original appointment. For new appointments to existing offices, their predecessor's name is given.

Portfolio	Minister	Party	Took office	Left office
Prime Minister and First Lord of the Treasury	Winston Churchill	Conservative	10 May 1940	23 May 1945
Deputy Prime Minister	Clement Attlee	Labour	19 February 1942	23 May 1945
Minister of Defence	Winston Churchill	Conservative	10 May 1940	23 May 1945
Lord Chancellor	John Simon, 1st Viscount Simon	Liberal National	12 May 1940	23 May 1945
Lord President of the Council	Neville Chamberlain	Conservative	10 May 1940	29 September 1940
Lord President of the Council	Sir John Anderson	National	3 October 1940	24 September 1943
Lord President of the Council	Clement Attlee	Labour	24 September 1943	23 May 1945
Lord Privy Seal	Clement Attlee	Labour	11 May 1940	15 February 1942
Lord Privy Seal	Sir Stafford Cripps	Ind. Labour	19 February 1942	22 November 1942
Lord Privy Seal	Robert Gascoyne-Cecil, Viscount Cranborne	Conservative	22 November 1942	24 September 1943
Lord Privy Seal	Max Aitken, 1st Baron Beaverbrook	Conservative	24 September 1943	23 May 1945
Minister without portfolio	Arthur Greenwood	Labour	11 May 1940	22 February 1942
Foreign Secretary	Edward Wood, 1st Viscount Halifax	Conservative	10 May 1940	22 December 1940
Foreign Secretary	Anthony Eden	Conservative	22 December 1940	23 May 1945
Chancellor of the Exchequer	Sir Kingsley Wood	Conservative	12 May 1940	21 September 1943
Chancellor of the Exchequer	Sir John Anderson	National	24 September 1943	23 May 1945
Home Secretary and Minister for Home Security	Sir John Anderson	National	12 May 1940	3 October 1940
Home Secretary and Minister for Home Security	Herbert Morrison	Labour	2 October 1940	23 May 1945
Minister of Labour and National Service	Ernest Bevin	Labour	13 May 1940	23 May 1945
Secretary of State for War	Anthony Eden	Conservative	11 May 1940	22 December 1940
Secretary of State for War	David Margesson	Conservative	22 December 1940	22 February 1942
Secretary of State for War	Sir James Grigg	National	22 February 1942	23 May 1945
Secretary of State for Air	Sir Archibald Sinclair	Liberal	11 May 1940	23 May 1945
First Lord of the Admiralty	A. V. Alexander	Labour	11 May 1940	23 May 1945
Leader of the House of Commons	Winston Churchill	Conservative	10 May 1940	19 February 1942
Leader of the House of Commons	Sir Stafford Cripps	Ind. Labour	19 February 1942	22 November 1942
Leader of the House of Commons	Anthony Eden	Conservative	22 November 1942	23 May 1945
Leader of the House of Lords	Thomas Inskip, 1st Viscount Caldecote	Conservative	10 May 1940	3 October 1940
Leader of the House of Lords	Edward Wood, 1st Viscount Halifax	Conservative	3 October 1940	22 December 1940
Leader of the House of Lords	George Lloyd, 1st Baron Lloyd	Conservative	22 December 1940	4 February 1941
Leader of the House of Lords	Walter Guinness, 1st Baron Moyne	Conservative	8 February 1941	21 February 1942
Leader of the House of Lords	Robert Gascoyne-Cecil, Viscount Cranborne	Conservative	21 February 1942	23 May 1945
Minister of Aircraft Production	Max Aitken, 1st Baron Beaverbrook	Conservative	2 August 1940	30 April 1941
Minister of Aircraft Production	John Moore-Brabazon	Conservative	1 May 1941	22 February 1942
Minister of Aircraft Production	John Llewellin	Conservative	22 February 1942	22 November 1942
Minister of Aircraft Production	Sir Stafford Cripps	Ind. Labour (to Feb. 1945)	22 November 1942	23 May 1945
Minister of Aircraft Production	Sir Stafford Cripps	Labour (Feb.–May 1945)	22 November 1942	23 May 1945
Minister of State	Max Aitken, 1st Baron Beaverbrook	Conservative	1 May 1941	29 June 1941
Minister of Supply	Herbert Morrison	Labour	12 May 1940	2 October 1940
Minister of Supply	Sir Andrew Rae Duncan	National	3 October 1940	29 June 1941
Minister of Supply	Max Aitken, 1st Baron Beaverbrook	Conservative	29 June 1941	4 February 1942
Minister of Supply	Sir Andrew Rae Duncan	National	4 February 1942	23 May 1945
Minister of (War) Production	Max Aitken, 1st Baron Beaverbrook	Conservative	4 February 1942	19 February 1942
Minister of (War) Production	Oliver Lyttelton	Conservative	12 March 1942	23 May 1945
Minister of Reconstruction	Frederick Marquis, 1st Baron Woolton	National	11 November 1943	23 May 1945
Minister-Resident for the Middle East	Oliver Lyttelton	Conservative	29 June 1941	12 March 1942
Minister-Resident for the Middle East	Richard Casey	National	12 March 1942	14 January 1944
Minister-Resident for the Middle East	Walter Guinness, 1st Baron Moyne	Conservative	14 January 1944	6 November 1944
Minister-Resident for the Middle East	Sir Edward Grigg	Conservative	21 November 1944	23 May 1945
Secretary of State for Dominion Affairs	Thomas Inskip, 1st Viscount Caldecote	Conservative	14 May 1940	3 October 1940
Secretary of State for Dominion Affairs	Robert Gascoyne-Cecil, Viscount Cranborne	Conservative	3 October 1940	15 February 1942
Secretary of State for Dominion Affairs	Clement Attlee	Labour	15 February 1942	24 September 1943
Secretary of State for Dominion Affairs	Robert Gascoyne-Cecil, Viscount Cranborne	Conservative	24 September 1943	23 May 1945
Minister of Information	Duff Cooper	Conservative	12 May 1940	20 July 1941
Minister of Information	Brendan Bracken	Conservative	20 July 1941	23 May 1945
Minister of Health	Malcolm MacDonald	National Labour	13 May 1940	8 February 1941
Minister of Health	Ernest Brown	Liberal National	8 February 1941	11 November 1943
Minister of Health	Henry Willink	Conservative	11 November 1943	23 May 1945
Minister of Food	Frederick Marquis, 1st Baron Woolton	Conservative	13 May 1940	11 November 1943
Minister of Food	John Llewellin	Conservative	11 November 1943	23 May 1945
Minister of Agriculture and Fisheries	Robert Hudson	Conservative	14 May 1940	23 May 1945
Minister of Economic Warfare	Hugh Dalton	Labour	15 May 1940	22 February 1942
Minister of Economic Warfare	Roundell Palmer, 3rd Earl of Selborne	Conservative	22 February 1942	23 May 1945
Chancellor of the Duchy of Lancaster	Maurice Hankey, 1st Baron Hankey	Independent	14 May 1940	20 July 1941
Chancellor of the Duchy of Lancaster	Duff Cooper	Conservative	20 July 1941	11 November 1943
Chancellor of the Duchy of Lancaster	Ernest Brown	Liberal National	11 November 1943	23 May 1945
Attorney General	Sir Donald Somervell	Conservative	15 May 1940	23 May 1945
Lord Advocate	Thomas Cooper	Conservative	15 May 1940	5 June 1941
Lord Advocate	James Reid	Conservative	5 June 1941	23 May 1945
Solicitor General	Sir William Jowitt	Labour	15 May 1940	4 March 1942
Solicitor General	Sir David Maxwell Fyfe	Conservative	4 March 1942	23 May 1945
Solicitor General for Scotland	James Reid	Conservative	15 May 1940	23 May 1945
Solicitor General for Scotland	David King Murray	Conservative	5 June 1941	23 May 1945
Paymaster General	Robert Gascoyne-Cecil, Viscount Cranborne	Conservative	15 May 1940	3 October 1940
Paymaster General	Maurice Hankey, 1st Baron Hankey	Independent	20 July 1941	4 March 1942
Paymaster General	Sir William Jowitt	Labour	4 March 1942	30 December 1942
Paymaster General	Frederick Lindemann, 1st Baron Cherwell	Conservative	30 December 1942	23 May 1945
Postmaster-General	William Morrison	Conservative	15 May 1940	7 February 1943
Postmaster-General	Harry Crookshank	Conservative	7 February 1943	23 May 1945
President of the Board of Education	Herwald Ramsbotham	Conservative	14 May 1940	20 July 1941
President of the Board of Education	Rab Butler	Conservative	20 July 1941	23 May 1945
President of the Board of Trade	Sir Andrew Rae Duncan	National	12 May 1940	3 October 1940
President of the Board of Trade	Oliver Lyttelton	Conservative	3 October 1940	29 June 1941
President of the Board of Trade	Sir Andrew Rae Duncan	National	29 June 1941	4 February 1942
President of the Board of Trade	John Llewellin	Conservative	4 February 1942	22 February 1942
President of the Board of Trade	Hugh Dalton	Labour	22 February 1942	23 May 1945
Secretary of State for India and Burma	Leo Amery	Conservative	13 May 1940	23 May 1945
Secretary of State for Scotland	Ernest Brown	Liberal National	14 May 1940	8 February 1941
Secretary of State for Scotland	Tom Johnston	Labour	8 February 1941	23 May 1945
Secretary of State for the Colonies	Lord Lloyd	Conservative	12 May 1940	4 February 1941
Secretary of State for the Colonies	Walter Guinness, 1st Baron Moyne	Conservative	8 February 1941	22 February 1942
Secretary of State for the Colonies	Robert Gascoyne-Cecil, Viscount Cranborne	Conservative	22 February 1942	22 November 1942
Secretary of State for the Colonies	Oliver Stanley	Conservative	22 November 1942	23 May 1945
Minister of Civil Aviation	Philip Cunliffe-Lister, 1st Viscount Swinton	Conservative	8 October 1944	23 May 1945
Minister of (War) Transport	Sir John Reith	National	14 May 1940	3 October 1940
Minister of (War) Transport	John Moore-Brabazon	Conservative	3 October 1940	1 May 1941
Minister of (War) Transport	Frederick Leathers, 1st Baron Leathers	Conservative	1 May 1941	23 May 1945
Minister of Shipping	Ronald Cross	Conservative	14 May 1940	1 May 1941
Minister of Pensions	Sir Walter Womersley	Conservative	15 May 1940	23 May 1945
Minister of Social/National Insurance	Sir William Jowitt	Labour	8 October 1944	23 May 1945
Minister of Fuel and Power	Gwilym Lloyd George	Liberal	3 June 1942	23 May 1945
Minister of Town and Country Planning	William Morrison	Conservative	7 February 1943	23 May 1945
Minister-Resident for North-West Africa	Harold Macmillan	Conservative	30 December 1942	23 May 1945
Minister-Resident for West Africa	Philip Cunliffe-Lister, 1st Viscount Swinton	Conservative	8 June 1942	8 October 1944
Minister-Resident for West Africa	Harold Balfour	Conservative	21 November 1944	23 May 1945
Minister without portfolio	Sir William Jowitt	Labour	30 December 1942	8 October 1944
First Commissioner of Works	George Tryon, 1st Baron Tryon	Conservative	18 May 1940	3 October 1940
First Commissioner of Works	Sir John Reith	National	3 October 1940	22 February 1942
First Commissioner of Works	Wyndham Portal, 1st Baron Portal	Conservative	22 February 1942	21 November 1944
First Commissioner of Works	Duncan Sandys	Conservative	21 November 1944	23 May 1945
Parliamentary Secretary to the Treasury (Government Chief Whip)	David Margesson	Conservative	17 May 1940	22 December 1940
Parliamentary Secretary to the Treasury (Government Chief Whip)	Sir Charles Edwards	Labour	17 May 1940	12 March 1942
Parliamentary Secretary to the Treasury (Government Chief Whip)	James Stuart	Conservative	14 January 1941	23 May 1945
Parliamentary Secretary to the Treasury (Government Chief Whip)	William Whiteley	Labour	12 March 1942	23 May 1945

=== Financial and parliamentary secretaries, 10 May 1940 – 23 May 1945 ===
This table lists the junior offices (often ministerial level 3) that held the title of Financial Secretary and/or Parliamentary Secretary. None of these officials were ever in the war cabinet. Their offices have rarely, if ever, been recognised as cabinet-level, although some of the office holders here did, at need, occasionally attend cabinet meetings. Some of the appointees retained offices that they held in former administrations and these are marked in situ with the date of their original appointment.

Portfolio	Minister	Party	Took office	Left office
Financial Secretary to the Admiralty	George Hall	Labour	4 February 1942	25 September 1943
Financial Secretary to the Admiralty	James Thomas	Conservative	25 September 1943	23 May 1945
Financial Secretary to the Treasury	Harry Crookshank	Conservative	15 May 1940	7 February 1943
Financial Secretary to the Treasury	Ralph Assheton	Conservative	7 February 1943	29 October 1944
Financial Secretary to the Treasury	Osbert Peake	Conservative	29 October 1944	23 May 1945
Financial Secretary to the War Office	Richard Law	Conservative	17 May 1940	20 July 1941
Financial Secretary to the War Office	Duncan Sandys	Conservative	20 July 1941	7 February 1943
Financial Secretary to the War Office	Arthur Henderson	Labour	7 February 1943	23 May 1945
Lords Commissioners of the Treasury	William Whytehead Boulton	Conservative	12 May 1940	13 March 1942
Lords Commissioners of the Treasury	Patrick Buchan-Hepburn	Conservative	12 May 1940	26 June 1940
Lords Commissioners of the Treasury	Stephen Furness	Liberal National	12 May 1940	18 May 1940
Lords Commissioners of the Treasury	Patrick Munro	Conservative	12 May 1940	13 March 1942
Lords Commissioners of the Treasury	James Stuart	Conservative	12 May 1940	14 January 1941
Lords Commissioners of the Treasury	Wilfred Paling	Labour	18 May 1940	8 February 1941
Lords Commissioners of the Treasury	James Thomas	Conservative	26 June 1940	25 September 1943
Lords Commissioners of the Treasury	Thomas Dugdale	Conservative	8 February 1941	23 February 1942
Lords Commissioners of the Treasury	William Murdoch Adamson	Labour	1 March 1941	2 October 1944
Lords Commissioners of the Treasury	Arthur Young	Conservative	23 February 1942	3 July 1944
Lords Commissioners of the Treasury	Sir John McEwen	Conservative	13 March 1942	6 December 1944
Lords Commissioners of the Treasury	Leslie Pym	Conservative	13 March 1942	23 May 1945
Lords Commissioners of the Treasury	Alec Beechman	Liberal National	25 September 1943	23 May 1945
Lords Commissioners of the Treasury	Cedric Drewe	Conservative	3 July 1944	23 May 1945
Lords Commissioners of the Treasury	William John	Labour	2 October 1944	23 May 1945
Lords Commissioners of the Treasury	Patrick Buchan-Hepburn	Conservative	6 December 1944	23 May 1945
Minister of State at the Foreign Office	Richard Law	Conservative	25 September 1943	23 May 1945
Parliamentary and Financial Secretary to the Admiralty	Sir Victor Warrender, 8th Baronet	Conservative	17 May 1940	23 May 1945
Parliamentary Secretary for India and Burma	Edward Cavendish, 10th Duke of Devonshire	Conservative	17 May 1940	1 January 1943
Parliamentary Secretary for India and Burma	Geoffrey FitzClarence, 5th Earl of Munster	Conservative	1 January 1943	31 October 1944
Parliamentary Secretary for India and Burma	William Hare, 5th Earl of Listowel	Labour	31 October 1944	23 May 1945
Parliamentary Secretary for the Home Department	William Mabane	Liberal National	15 May 1940	3 June 1942
Parliamentary Secretary for the Home Department	Ellen Wilkinson	Labour	8 October 1940	23 May 1945
Parliamentary Secretary to the Board of Education	James Chuter Ede	Labour	15 May 1940	23 May 1945
Parliamentary Secretary to the Board of Trade	Gwilym Lloyd George	Liberal	15 May 1940	8 February 1941
Parliamentary Secretary to the Board of Trade	Charles Waterhouse	Conservative	8 February 1941	23 May 1945
Parliamentary Secretary to the Ministry of Agriculture and Fisheries	Walter Guinness, 1st Baron Moyne	Conservative	15 May 1940	8 February 1941
Parliamentary Secretary to the Ministry of Agriculture and Fisheries	Tom Williams	Labour	15 May 1940	23 May 1945
Parliamentary Secretary to the Ministry of Agriculture and Fisheries	Bernard Fitzalan-Howard, 16th Duke of Norfolk	Conservative	8 February 1941	23 May 1945
Parliamentary Secretary to the Ministry of Aircraft Production	John Llewellin	Conservative	15 May 1940	1 May 1941
Parliamentary Secretary to the Ministry of Aircraft Production	Frederick Montague	Labour	1 May 1941	4 March 1942
Parliamentary Secretary to the Ministry of Aircraft Production	Ben Smith	Labour	4 March 1942	11 November 1943
Parliamentary Secretary to the Ministry of Aircraft Production	Alan Lennox-Boyd	Conservative	11 November 1943	23 May 1945
Parliamentary Secretary to the Ministry of Civil Aviation	Robert Perkins	Conservative	22 March 1945	23 May 1945
Parliamentary Secretary to the Ministry of Economic Warfare	Dingle Foot	Liberal	17 May 1940	23 May 1945
Parliamentary Secretary to the Ministry of Food	Robert Boothby	Conservative	15 May 1940	22 October 1940
Parliamentary Secretary to the Ministry of Food	Gwilym Lloyd George	Liberal	22 October 1940	3 June 1942
Parliamentary Secretary to the Ministry of Food	William Mabane	Liberal National	3 June 1942	23 May 1945
Parliamentary Secretary to the Ministry of Fuel and Power	Geoffrey Lloyd	Conservative	3 June 1942	23 May 1945
Parliamentary Secretary to the Ministry of Fuel and Power	Tom Smith	Labour	3 June 1942	23 May 1945
Parliamentary Secretary to the Ministry of Health	Florence Horsbrugh	Conservative	15 May 1940	23 May 1945
Parliamentary Secretary to the Ministry of Information	Harold Nicolson	National Labour	17 May 1940	20 July 1941
Parliamentary Secretary to the Ministry of Information	Ernest Thurtle	Labour	20 July 1941	23 May 1945
Parliamentary Secretary to the Ministry of Labour	Ralph Assheton	Conservative	15 May 1940	4 February 1942
Parliamentary Secretary to the Ministry of Labour	George Tomlinson	Labour	8 February 1941	23 May 1945
Parliamentary Secretary to the Ministry of Labour	Malcolm McCorquodale	Conservative	4 February 1942	23 May 1945
Parliamentary Secretary to the Ministry of National Insurance	Charles Peat	Conservative	22 March 1945	23 May 1945
Parliamentary Secretary to the Ministry of Pensions	Ellen Wilkinson	Labour	17 May 1940	8 October 1940
Parliamentary Secretary to the Ministry of Pensions	George Tryon, 1st Baron Tryon	Conservative	8 October 1940	24 November 1940
Parliamentary Secretary to the Ministry of Pensions	Wilfred Paling	Labour	8 February 1941	23 May 1945
Parliamentary Secretary to the Ministry of Production	George Garro-Jones	Labour	10 September 1942	23 May 1945
Parliamentary Secretary to the Ministry of Shipping	Sir Arthur Salter	Independent	15 May 1940	29 June 1941
Parliamentary Secretary to the Ministry of Supply	Harold Macmillan	Conservative	15 May 1940	4 February 1942
Parliamentary Secretary to the Ministry of Supply	Wyndham Portal, 1st Baron Portal	Conservative	4 September 1940	22 February 1942
Parliamentary Secretary to the Ministry of Supply	Ralph Assheton	Conservative	4 February 1942	7 February 1943
Parliamentary Secretary to the Ministry of Supply	Charles Peat	Conservative	4 March 1942	22 March 1945
Parliamentary Secretary to the Ministry of Supply	Duncan Sandys	Conservative	7 February 1943	21 November 1944
Parliamentary Secretary to the Ministry of Supply	John Wilmot	Labour	21 November 1944	23 May 1945
Parliamentary Secretary to the Ministry of Supply	James de Rothschild	Liberal	22 March 1945	23 May 1945
Parliamentary Secretary to the Ministry of Town and Country Planning	Henry Strauss	Conservative	30 December 1942	22 March 1945
Parliamentary Secretary to the Ministry of Town and Country Planning	Arthur Jenkins	Labour	22 March 1945	23 May 1945
Parliamentary Secretary to the Ministry of War Transport	Frederick Montague	Labour	18 May 1940	1 May 1941
Parliamentary Secretary to the Ministry of War Transport	John Llewellin	Conservative	1 May 1941	4 February 1942
Parliamentary Secretary to the Ministry of War Transport	Sir Arthur Salter	Independent	29 June 1941	23 May 1945
Parliamentary Secretary to the Ministry of Works	George Hicks	Labour	19 November 1940	23 May 1945
Parliamentary Secretary to the Ministry of Works	Henry Strauss	Conservative	4 March 1942	30 December 1942

=== Other junior ministries, 10 May 1940 – 23 May 1945 ===
This table lists the junior offices (often ministerial level 3) whose titles signify an assistant, deputy or under-secretary function. It excludes financial and parliamentary secretaries who are in the table above. None of these officials were ever in the war cabinet. Their offices have rarely, if ever, been recognised as cabinet-level, although some of the office holders here did, at need, occasionally attend cabinet meetings. Some of the appointees retained offices that they held in former administrations and these are marked in situ with the date of their original appointment.

Portfolio	Minister	Party	Took office	Left office
Assistant Postmaster-General	Charles Waterhouse	Conservative	17 May 1940	1 March 1941
Assistant Postmaster-General	Allan Chapman	Conservative	1 March 1941	4 March 1942
Assistant Postmaster-General	Robert Grimston	Conservative	4 March 1942	23 May 1945
Civil Lord of the Admiralty	Sir Austin Hudson, 1st Baronet	Conservative	15 May 1940	4 March 1942
Civil Lord of the Admiralty	Richard Pilkington	Conservative	4 March 1942	23 May 1945
Deputy Minister-Resident for the Middle East	Walter Guinness, 1st Baron Moyne	Conservative	27 August 1942	28 January 1944
Secretary for Mines	David Grenfell	Labour	15 May 1940	23 May 1945
Secretary for Petroleum	Geoffrey Lloyd	Conservative	15 May 1940	3 June 1942
Secretary for Overseas Trade	Harcourt Johnstone	Liberal	15 May 1940	1 March 1945
Under-Secretary of State for Air	Harold Balfour	Conservative	15 May 1940	21 November 1944
Under-Secretary of State for Air	Hugh Seely, 1st Baron Sherwood	Liberal	20 July 1941	23 May 1945
Under-Secretary of State for Air	Rupert Brabner	Conservative	21 November 1944	27 March 1945
Under-Secretary of State for Air	Quintin Hogg	Conservative	12 April 1945	23 May 1945
Under-Secretary of State for Dominion Affairs	Geoffrey Shakespeare	Liberal National	15 May 1940	4 March 1942
Under-Secretary of State for Dominion Affairs	Paul Emrys-Evans	Conservative	4 March 1942	23 May 1945
Under-Secretary of State for Foreign Affairs	Rab Butler	Conservative	15 May 1940	20 July 1941
Under-Secretary of State for Foreign Affairs	Richard Law	Conservative	20 July 1941	25 September 1943
Under-Secretary of State for Foreign Affairs	George Hall	Labour	25 September 1943	23 May 1945
Under-Secretary of State for Scotland	Joseph Westwood	Labour	17 May 1940	23 May 1945
Under-Secretary of State for Scotland	Henry Wedderburn	Conservative	8 February 1941	4 March 1942
Under-Secretary of State for Scotland	Allan Chapman	Conservative	4 March 1942	23 May 1945
Under-Secretary of State for the Colonies	George Hall	Labour	15 May 1940	4 February 1942
Under-Secretary of State for the Colonies	Harold Macmillan	Conservative	4 February 1942	1 January 1943
Under-Secretary of State for the Colonies	Edward Cavendish, 10th Duke of Devonshire	Conservative	1 January 1943	23 May 1945
Under-Secretary of State for the Home Department	Osbert Peake	Conservative	15 May 1940	31 October 1944
Under-Secretary of State for the Home Department	Geoffrey FitzClarence, 5th Earl of Munster	Conservative	31 October 1944	23 May 1945
Under-Secretary of State for War	Sir Henry Page Croft	Conservative	17 May 1940	23 May 1945
Under-Secretary of State for War	Sir Edward Grigg	Conservative	17 May 1940	4 March 1942
Under-Secretary of State for War	Arthur Henderson	Labour	4 March 1942	7 February 1943

=== Royal household appointments, 10 May 1940 – 23 May 1945 ===
This table lists the officers appointed to the royal household during the Churchill administration.

Portfolio	Minister	Party	Took office	Left office
Captain of the Gentlemen-at-Arms	Harry Snell, 1st Baron Snell	Labour	31 May 1940	21 April 1944
Captain of the Gentlemen-at-Arms	Hugh Fortescue, 5th Earl Fortescue	Conservative	22 March 1945	23 May 1945
Captain of the Yeomen of the Guard	Arthur Chichester, 4th Baron Templemore	Conservative	31 May 1940	23 May 1945
Comptroller of the Household	William Whiteley	Labour	17 May 1940	12 March 1942
Comptroller of the Household	William John	Labour	12 March 1942	2 October 1944
Comptroller of the Household	George Mathers	Labour	2 October 1944	23 May 1945
Lords-in-Waiting	Hugh Fortescue, 5th Earl Fortescue	Conservative	10 May 1940	22 March 1945
Lords-in-Waiting	Robert Munro, 1st Baron Alness	Liberal National	31 May 1940	23 May 1945
Lords-in-Waiting	Francis Agar-Robartes, 7th Viscount Clifden	Liberal	31 May 1940	23 May 1945
Lords-in-Waiting	Oswald Phipps, 4th Marquess of Normanby	Conservative	22 March 1945	23 May 1945
Treasurer of the Household	Robert Grimston	Conservative	17 May 1940	4 March 1942
Treasurer of the Household	Sir James Edmondson	Conservative	12 March 1942	23 May 1945
Vice-Chamberlain of the Household	Sir James Edmondson	Conservative	17 May 1940	12 March 1942
Vice-Chamberlain of the Household	William Whytehead Boulton	Conservative	12 March 1942	13 July 1944
Vice-Chamberlain of the Household	Arthur Young	Conservative	13 July 1944	23 May 1945

== See also ==
- Allied leaders of World War II
- Timeline of Winston Churchill's first premiership
- Winston Churchill in the Second World War

== Bibliography ==
- Butler, David; Butler, Gareth (1994). British Political Facts 1900–1994 (7 ed.). Basingstoke and London: The Macmillan Press.
- Churchill, Winston (1968) [1st pub. 1948]. The Twilight War: 3 September 1939 – 10 May 1940. The Second World War. Vol. II (9th ed.). London: Cassell & Co. Ltd.
- Churchill, Winston (1970a) [first published 1949]. The Fall of France: May 1940 – August 1940. The Second World War. Vol. III (9th ed.). London: Cassell & Co. Ltd.
- Gilbert, Martin (1983). Winston S. Churchill, Vol. 6: Finest Hour, 1939–1941. Heinemann. ISBN 978-04-34130-14-6.
- Gilbert, Martin (1991). Churchill: A Life. London: Heinemann. ISBN 978-04-34291-83-0.
- Hastings, Max (2009). Finest Years. Churchill as Warlord, 1940–45. Hammersmith: Harper Collins. ISBN 978-00-07263-67-7.
- Hermiston, Roger (2016). All Behind You, Winston – Churchill's Great Coalition, 1940–45. London: Aurum Press. ISBN 978-17-81316-64-1.
- Jenkins, Roy (2001). Churchill. London: MacMillan Press. ISBN 978-03-30488-05-1.
- Owen, David (2016). Cabinet's Finest Hour. London: Haus Publishing Ltd. ISBN 978-19-10376-55-3.
- Pelling, Henry (June 1980). "The 1945 General Election Reconsidered". The Historical Journal. 23 (2). Cambridge University Press: 399–414. doi:10.1017/S0018246X0002433X. JSTOR 2638675. S2CID 154658298.
- Shakespeare, Nicholas (2017). Six Minutes in May. London: Vintage. ISBN 978-17-84701-00-0.
- Thornton, Stephen. "The brace of the Cabinet: the legacy of Clement Attlee as deputy prime minister." Contemporary British History (2024): 1-24.
- Wheeler-Bennett, John (1958). King George VI, His Life and Reign. London: Macmillan. OCLC 655565202.

Preceded by Chamberlain war ministry	Government of the United Kingdom; 1940–1945	Succeeded by Churchill caretaker ministry
