= Petroleum Board =

- Type: Non-governmental organization
- Industry: Oil and Petroleum
- Predecessor: Oil Board
- Founded: September 1939
- Defunct: 30 June 1948
- Fate: War-time organization: dissolved after the Second World War
- Successor: United Kingdom Petroleum Advisory Committee; Oil Industry Advisory Council
- Headquarters: Shell Mex House, Strand, London
- Area served: United Kingdom
- Key people: see text
- Services: Coordination of petroleum supplies

The Petroleum Board was a non-governmental organisation, established at the outbreak of World War II, to coordinate wartime supplies of petroleum and petroleum products throughout the United Kingdom. It was composed of senior executives of the major oil companies who operated an ‘oil pool’ with distribution controlled by the Board. The board was dissolved in June 1948 nearly three years after hostilities ended.

== Background ==
In the inter-war period the strategic planning of the UK's oil supplies in the event of war was the responsibility of the Oil Board. This was established in 1925 as a sub-committee of the Committee of Imperial Defence. By the late 1930s the Oil Board's preparatory work for war was focused on potential sources of supply particularly from the Middle East, and Central and South America, together with practical issues of tankage and storage. The Oil Board planned that wartime petroleum was to be operated on the basis of an ‘oil pool’ with production of petroleum from individual companies pooled and then controlled and distributed by a Petroleum Board.

Following the establishment of the Petroleum Board the functions of the Oil Board were subsumed in the Petroleum Department (Secretary for Petroleum) of the Board of Trade.

== Operations ==
The Petroleum Board was established within a week of the outbreak of the Second World War in September 1939. It was based in Shell Mex House on the Strand, London. The membership comprised the Chairmen or Chief Executives of most of the petroleum and oil companies operating in the UK. The original corporate membership was the Anglo-American Oil Company, the National Benzole, Shell-Mex & BP, and Trinidad Leaseholds and their associated companies. Other oil companies joined the Board later. The aim of the board was to oversee the import, processing, storage, distribution and delivery of all petroleum products in the UK with the exception of oil for the Royal Navy. Supplies of petroleum and petroleum products were no longer branded and competition between the oil companies was suspended.

The board was acknowledged to have been effective. The success was claimed to be largely due to the Board's Chairman, Sir Andrew Agnew, who had extensive knowledge of the oil industry and commanded respect within it. Sir Andrew was Managing Director of Shell Transport and Trading. In 1940 with most of the east coast and English Channel ports closed by enemy bombing there was congestion of shipping at the west coast ports in Bristol Channel, the River Mersey and the River Clyde. The amount of petroleum being imported was limited to pre-war levels. The Petroleum Board addressed these logistical issues and achieved a doubling of oil import by the summer of 1941. Also during the fuel crisis during the winter of 1940-41 there were few problems with the distribution of petroleum. The board made arrangements to use oil barges and ‘block’ trains to transport oil.

In 1941 there were reports in the press concerning rationing of petrol that had incorrectly identified the Petroleum Board as being the authority responsible for rationing. This prompted the chairman of the Petroleum Board, Sir Andrew Agnew, to write to the press to assert that the Board was not responsible for rationing. He pointed out that this was the responsibility of the Petroleum Department of Board of Trade, and the Ministry of War Transport.

== Post-war coordination ==
The original agreement, made when the Petroleum Board was established, provided for its dissolution no more than two years after the state of emergency ended. The oil companies also wished to return to individual marketing and claimed that the continuation of pooling was frustrating the development of distribution. In August 1947 the Minister of Fuel and Power announced that the Petroleum Board would be dissolved on 31 December 1947. The war-time pooling arrangements had been retained long after most countries had returned to commercial supplies. In the event the Petroleum Board was dissolved on 30 June 1948. However, the individual companies agreed not to introduce branded products for at least six months. In Parliament the Minister of Fuel and Power acknowledged the ‘government’s appreciation of the great wartime services ... by the Petroleum Board ... and to thank all members and staff ... for the valuable work they have done’.

To continue coordination of petroleum supplies the Minister directed the oil industry to set up two advisory committees to provide liaison between the industry and the government. These were the United Kingdom Petroleum Advisory Committee to provide information to, and cooperate with, government in safeguarding the national interest in petroleum. And the Oil Industry Advisory Council to act with the government on oil matters in general.

== Key people ==
The members of the Board in 1939 were:

- Sir Andrew Agnew, C.B.E. (Chairman).
- Mr. R. Beaumont.
- Sir William Fraser, C.B.E.
- Mr. F. Godber.
- Mr. F. L. Halford.
- Mr. A. Hittinger.
- Mr. A. J. Singleton.
- Mr. E. E. Soubry.
- Mr. F. J. Wolfe.
- Secretary–Mr. H. E. Snow.

== See also ==
- Oil and gas industry in the United Kingdom
- Ministry of Fuel and Power
- Secretary for Petroleum
- Petroleum Executive
