= Reginald Ayres =

British civil servant

Sir Reginald John Ayres, KBE, CB (22 April 1900 – 25 June 1966) was a British civil servant.

== Biography ==
Born in 1900, aged 15 Ayres joined the Admiralty as a boy clerk, before joining the armed forces in 1918; he left as a Sergeant in 1920 and joined the Ministry of Labour as an executive officer. In 1942, he joined the Ministry of Fuel and Power as Deputy Accountant General. He became Under Secretary for Finance and Accountant General in 1950 and Deputy Secretary in 1950, before retiring in 1961. He was appointed an Officer of the Order of the British Empire (OBE) in 1946), a Commander (CBE) in 1949 and Knight Commander (KBE) in 1958; he was also a Companion of the Order of the Bath (CB). In the inter-war period, Ayres's work with the Ministry of Labour in the north-east of England brought him into contact with unemployed miners and their families, which stimulated what The Times called his "deep devotion to the coal industry"; he served as a part-time member of the National Coal Board after retiring from the civil service. His time at the Ministry of Fuel and Power in the 1940s was concerned with nationalising the coal industry - overseeing fuel policy thereafter. The Times wrote that "it was all too easy to assume, on first acquaintance, that he was a solid, strong, reliable, experienced and shrewd civil servant, and nothing more. In fact ... he was an original thinking and inspiring leader ... his whole career was a fine example of public service in the best sense". In 1922, he married Rosalie Smelt and they had four children: two sons and two daughters. He died on 25 June 1966.

== Likenesses ==
- Obituary in The Times (London), 29 June 1966, p. 14.
