= Andrew Agnew (businessman) =

British oil company executive (1882–1955)

Sir Andrew Agnew CBE
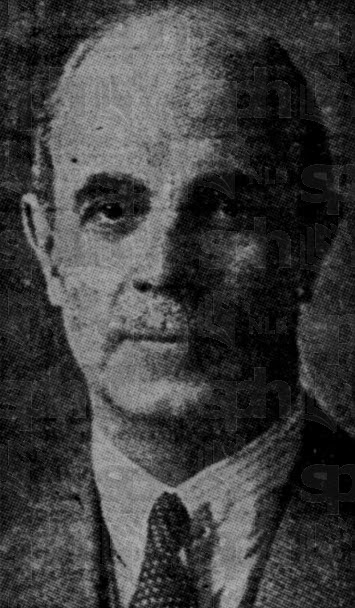
- Agnew in 1938
- Born: 28 February 1882; Greenock, Scotland
- Died: 4 March 1955 (aged 73); New Galloway, Scotland
- Occupation: Senior oil company executive
- Children: 2

Sir Andrew Agnew (28 February 1882 – 4 March 1955) was a Scottish oil company executive. He was managing director of Shell Transport and Trading Company part of the Royal Dutch Shell Group where he worked for over fifty years.

== Early life and education ==
Agnew was born on 28 February 1882 in Greenock, Scotland, the son of Andrew Agnew. He was educated at Greenock Academy.

== Career ==
Agnew began his career in the Far East in 1902 when he went to Singapore and joined the firm of Syme and Company, agents of Shell, as junior assistant. In 1908, he joined Asiatic Petroleum Company and rose to general manager for Malaya. During the First World War, he served as commandant of the Singapore Civil Guard. He was chairman of the River Craft Committee which located and sent supplies and Chinese labour to Mesopotamia. He was a member of the Legislative Council of the Straits Settlements, member of the Singapore Harbour Board and the Committee of Singapore Chamber of Commerce. He was a member of the Shipping Control Committee and the Food Control Committee. In 1922, after returning to London, he became director of Asiatic Petroleum Company and Anglo-Saxon Petroleum Company. He was managing director of Shell Transport and Trading Company and played a key role in the management of the affairs of Royal Dutch Shell Group of which the company was a founder member with Royal Dutch Petroleum Company.

Agnew resigned as managing director of Shell Group in 1938 but remained as director of Shell Transport and Trading Company. In 1939, he was appointed war-time chairman of the Petroleum Board and was responsible for the underwater pipeline across the English Channel which supplied fuel to the Allied forces during the invasion of Europe. On the board of more than seventy oil companies, it was said that "to him is usually left the negotiations of European oil concessions with those of America." He received several foreign honours. After spending over fifty years with Shell he retired in 1954.

== Personal life and death ==
Agnew married Bella McClymont in 1912 and they had two sons.

Agnew died on 4 March 1955 in New Galloway, Kirkcudbrightshire, Scotland.

== Honours ==
Agnew was appointed Commander of the Order of the British Empire (CBE) in the 1918 New Year Honours. He was created a Knight Bachelor in the 1938 Birthday Honours. In 1939, he was created Commander of the Order of Orange-Nassau and, in the same year, the Legion of Honour. In 1946, he was awarded the United States Medal of Freedom with Silver Palm in recognition of war-time services.
