= John Cadman, 1st Baron Cadman =

British mining engineer, petroleum technologist and public servant (1877–1941)

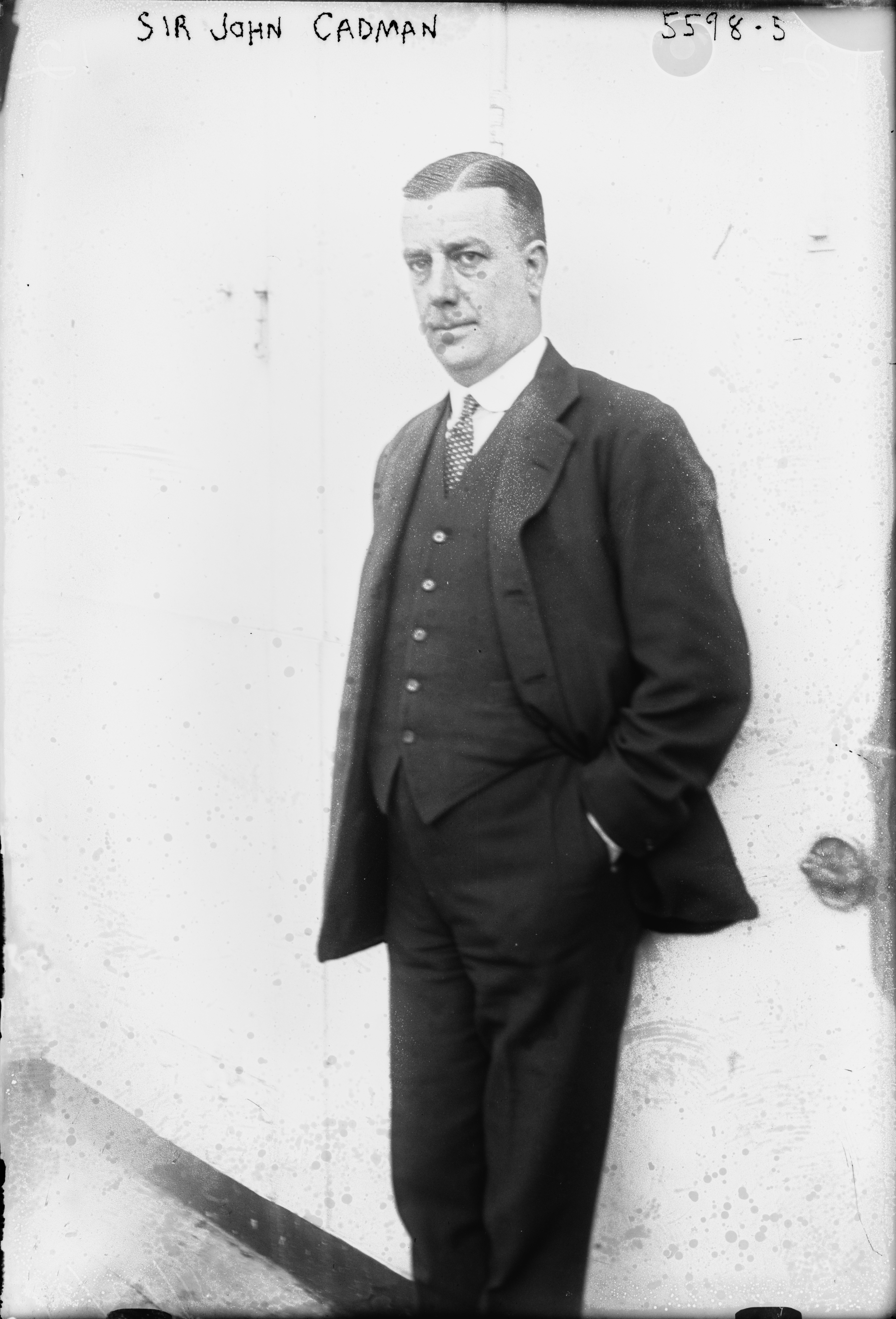
John Cadman

John Cadman, 1st Baron Cadman GCMG FRS (7 September 1877 – 31 May 1941), was a British mining engineer, petroleum technologist and public servant.

== Early life ==
Cadman was educated at Armstrong College, University of Durham, and received a first class Honours in Geology in 1899.

== Career ==
Cadman served as Inspector of Mines in Trinidad and Tobago in the first decade of the 20th century. At that time Trinidad and Tobago was a British Colony. As Inspector of Mines he was responsible for the commercialization of Trinidad's oil in 1907. In this effort Cadman was joined by Arthur "Beeby" Thompson who was an engineer with oilfield experience in Russia.

Cadman later went on to teach petroleum engineering at Birmingham University in the UK. Cadman is credited with creating the course "Petroleum Engineering". He was director of the Petroleum Executive.

Cadman became Technical Adviser for the Anglo-Persian Oil Company in 1921, before becoming the company's Director in 1923. In 1927, he was appointed as the company's Chairman. He expanded production fourfold and eventually joined a venture by Henri Deterding of Royal Dutch/Shell to stabilize petroleum prices.

== Marriage and family ==
Cadman married Lilian Harrigan in 1907. The couple had four children, daughters Marguerite and Sybil, and sons John and Denys.

== Honours ==
He was created CMG in 1916, KCMG in 1918 and GCMG in 1929. On 7 June 1937 he was raised to the peerage as Baron Cadman, of Silverdale in the County of Stafford.

In 1940 he was elected a Fellow of the Royal Society.

On 17 May 2007 Silverdale Parish Council voted to name a new street "Cadman Close" in honour of Lord Cadman.

Coat of arms of John Cadman, 1st Baron Cadman
Crest A stork’s head holding in the beak a sprig of Columbine Proper. Escutcheon Azure three fleur-de-lis in pale between four pallets indented Argent. Supporters On the dexter side a stork and on the sinister side a peacock Argent beaked Gules each gorged with a collar Azure charged with a fleur-de-lis also Argent. Motto Semper Paratus

== See also ==
- Anglo-Persian Oil Company
- Abdolhossein Teymourtash

Peerage of the United Kingdom
New creation	Baron Cadman; 1937–1941	Succeeded by John Basil Cope Cadman
