= Petroleum Executive =

- Company type: Government body
- Industry: Petroleum supply
- Founded: 1917
- Founder: UK War cabinet
- Defunct: 1922
- Fate: Merged into Board of Trade
- Successor: Committee of Imperial Defence: Oil Board
- Headquarters: London, England
- Area served: UK
- Key people: see text
- Services: Coordination of Petroleum supplies

The Petroleum Executive was a UK government body established during World War I to regulate the production, import, storage, allocation, distribution and use of petroleum and petroleum products throughout the United Kingdom.

== Background ==
The successful operation of the mechanised First World War was critically dependent on the availability of petroleum and petroleum products. New weapons such as aircraft and tanks; together with transport and logistics required petroleum for their operation. High explosives such as TNT was made from toluol derived from petroleum. But the most critical use was in shipping for the Royal Navy and merchant fleets. Three quarters of Britain's oil came from the United States. By early 1917 German submarines made special efforts to attack petroleum tankers. As a result, British Admiralty officials identified that there would soon be a critical shortage of fuel. Fleet commanders were given notice to restrict the operation of their vessels. The instigation of the convoy system, with merchant shipping protected by Naval vessels, improved the supply of petroleum.

There was also a domestic fuel shortage, in part a consequence of the Navy's demand. The Admiralty requisitioned so many tankers for its own needs that there were insufficient to carry petrol. Stocks of petrol fell from 36 million gallons on 1 January 1916 to 12.5 million gallons on 31 July 1916.

The supply crisis prompted the government to act. On 22 May 1917 the War Cabinet instructed Walter Long, the Secretary of State for the Colonies, to examine the whole question of petroleum supplies.

== Petroleum Executive ==
The Petroleum Executive was established in December 1917. Long was the Minister-in-charge and he appointed Professor John Cadman as the Director. Cadman was the liaison officer between various government departments. The Executive's remit was to ensure that all military and naval services had adequate supplies of oil, to address issues of general policy, and to co-ordinate those Government departments with an interest in petroleum.

Supplies were allocated and rationed with the armed forces given priority. The Petroleum Executive had taken steps to get control over as much oil as possible. Domestic production was also encouraged; as one American observer noted ‘the Petroleum Executive was untiring in its effort to stimulate the production within the United Kingdom of oil suitable for use as fuel, whether from coal tar and blast furnaces or the distillation of Scotch shales, of cannel coals, or of pitch and coal tar’.

The Petroleum Executive was established in wartime over a crisis in Britain's oil supplies; after the war, the government had to decide whether to have a body to co-ordinate oil policy. Long and Cadman wanted to eventually develop the Executive into a Ministry of Petroleum, but this would need departments to relinquish control over their interests in petroleum.

The independent Petroleum Executive was retained for a few years, but in 1922 it was retrenched into the Board of Trade as a cost cutting measure.

In the interwar period the strategic production, storage and use of oil was overseen by the Committee of Imperial Defence: Oil Fuel Board (1925-1939). Topics covered include civil and military requirements for oil, oil requirements in war-time, tanker tonnage and oil stocks, oil from coal and the treatment of coal. At the outbreak of World War 2 the Petroleum Board was established.

== Personnel ==
Notable people and their role in the Petroleum Executive were:

- Walter Hume Long, later Viscount Long (1954-1924), MP Secretary of State for the Colonies
- Sir John Cadman, later Baron Cadman (1877-1941), Director 1917-21
- Sir Boverton Redwood (1846-1919), Director of Technical Investigation 1917-19
- Edward S. Shrapnell-Smith (1875-1952), deputy director, Chief Economy Advisor 1917-19
- Edward H. C. Craig (1874-1946), Geological Advisor 1917-1918
- John Courtenay Clarke (18?? -1936), deputy director then Director 1917-18

== Location ==
The headquarters of the Petroleum Executive was at 8 Northumberland Avenue London WC2 from 1917 to 1919, from April 1919 it was at 12 Berkeley Street W1.

== Other governmental oil committees ==
- Admiralty Oil Committee (1903-6)
- Admiralty Oil Committee (1911-2)
- Admiralty Standing Committee on Liquid Fuel
- Cabinet Committee on Oil Company Amalgamation
- Inter-departmental Oil Committee
- Joint Oil Committee (1904-6)

== See also ==
- Petroleum Board
