= Eighty Strand =

Grade II listed building in London

Coordinates: 51.50981°N 0.12133°W

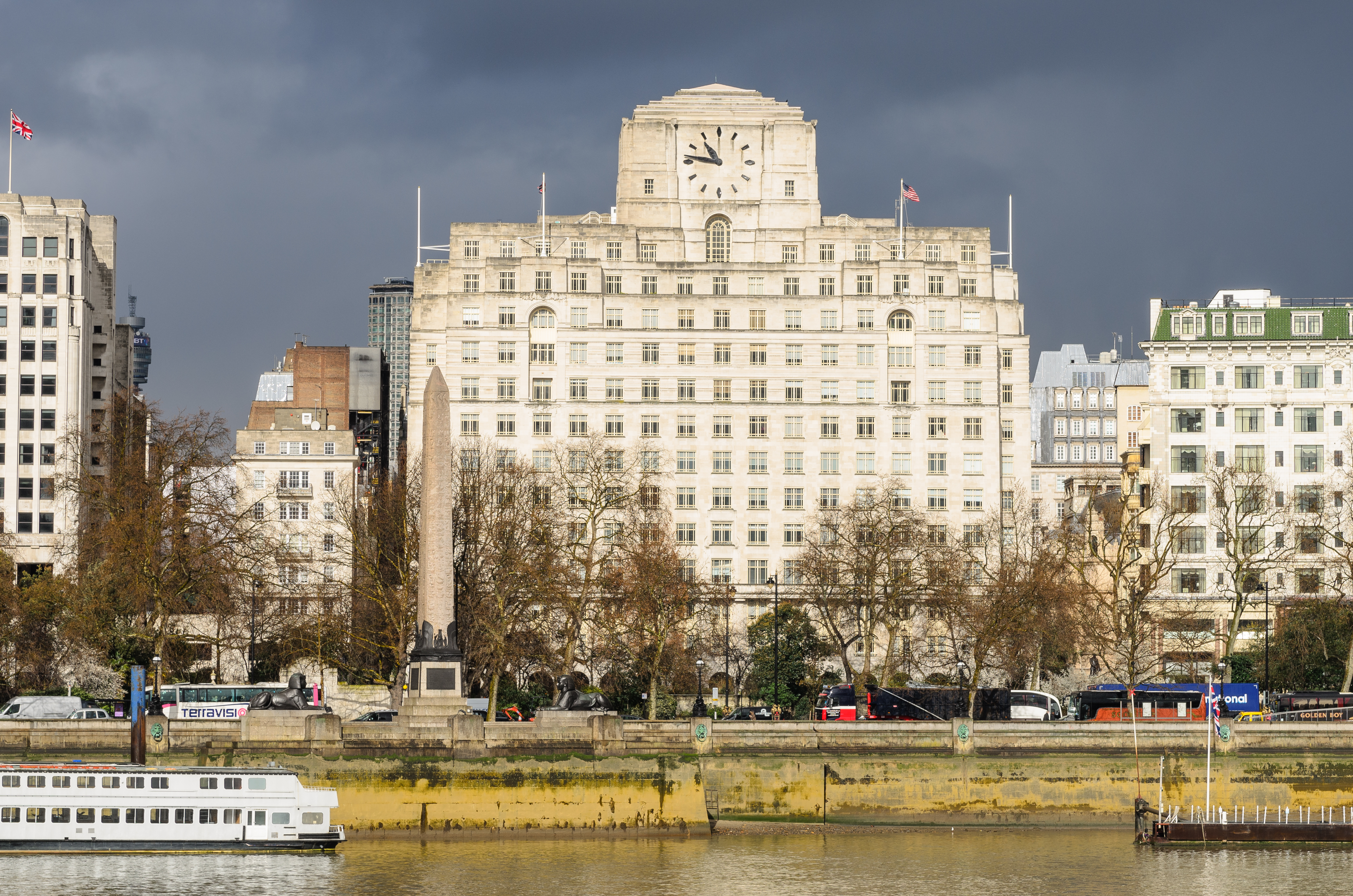
- The south side of Eighty Strand, facing the Victoria Embankment and River Thames in 2014
- Alternative names: Shell max house

General information
- Location: Strand, London, England
- Opened: 1932
- Owner: Shell-Mex & BP (1932–1976); Shell (1976–1990s)

Technical details
- Floor count: 12

Website
- eighty-strand.co.uk

Eighty Strand, formerly Shell Mex House, is a grade II listed building located at 80 Strand, London, England. The building was opened in 1932 on the site of the Hotel Cecil and stands behind the original façade of the hotel, between the Adelphi building and the Savoy Hotel. Broadly Art Deco in style, it was designed by Frances Milton Cashmore of the architectural firm of Messrs Joseph.

Standing 58 m (190 ft) tall, with 537,000 sq ft (49,900 m^{2}) of floor space, Eighty Strand has 12 floors (plus basement and sub-basement) and is immediately recognisable from the River Thames and the South Bank by the clock positioned on the south side of the building. The clock is flanked by four large, hieratic marble figures at the south corners sculpted by William Charles Holland King. The clock, which was known for a time as "Big Benzene", has the largest clock faces in the UK, at 7.62 metres in diameter, just 0.02 metres more than the clocks on the Royal Liver Building in Liverpool; it was supplied by Gillett & Johnston of Croydon. The building faces the river and the Strand. It was described by architectural historian Nikolaus Pevsner as "thoroughly unsubtle, but...hold[s] its own in London's river front."

== History ==
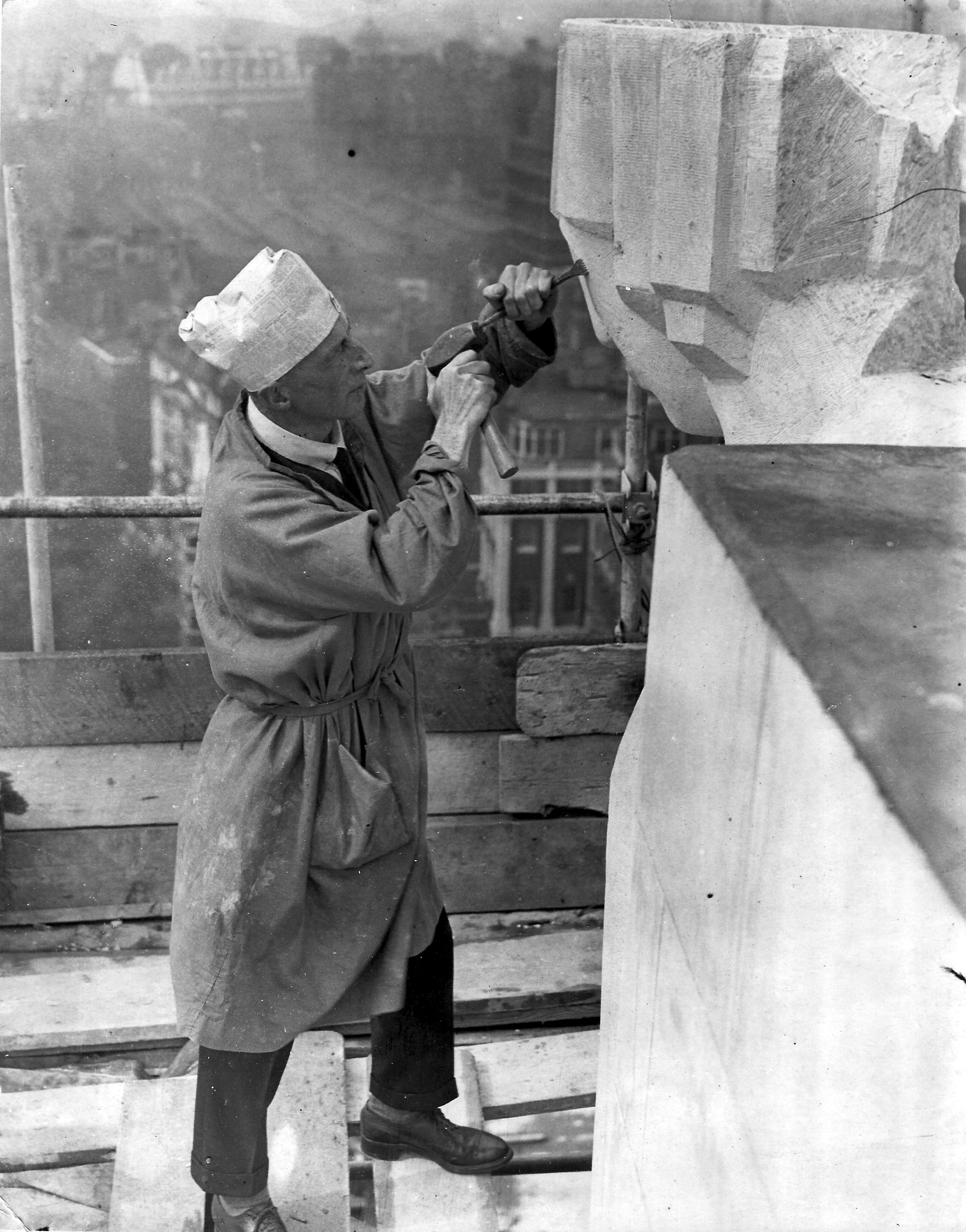
The sculptor WCH King with one of four sculptures he created on the Shell Mex House in London 1932

The building was for many years the London headquarters of Shell-Mex & BP, for which it was built. Shell-Mex & BP was a joint venture company created by Shell and BP in 1932, when they decided to merge their United Kingdom marketing operations. Upon the UK marketing separation of Shell and BP in 1976, Shell Mex House became the head office of Shell UK, which was Shell's UK operating company. Changes in the way that Shell was run in the 1990s led to the disposal of the property by Shell. Today, simply known as Eighty Strand, most of its floors are occupied by companies belonging to Pearson plc.

The entrance of the building, which is set back from the Strand, is through a large gated archway. A green plaque was affixed to the wall just inside the gate in March 2008, proclaiming: "The Royal Air Force was formed and had its first headquarters here in the former Hotel Cecil on 1st April 1918". Below it is a brass plate stating: "This plaque was unveiled by the Chief of the Air Staff Air Chief Marshal Sir Glenn Torpy to mark the 90th anniversary of the formation of the Royal Air Force".

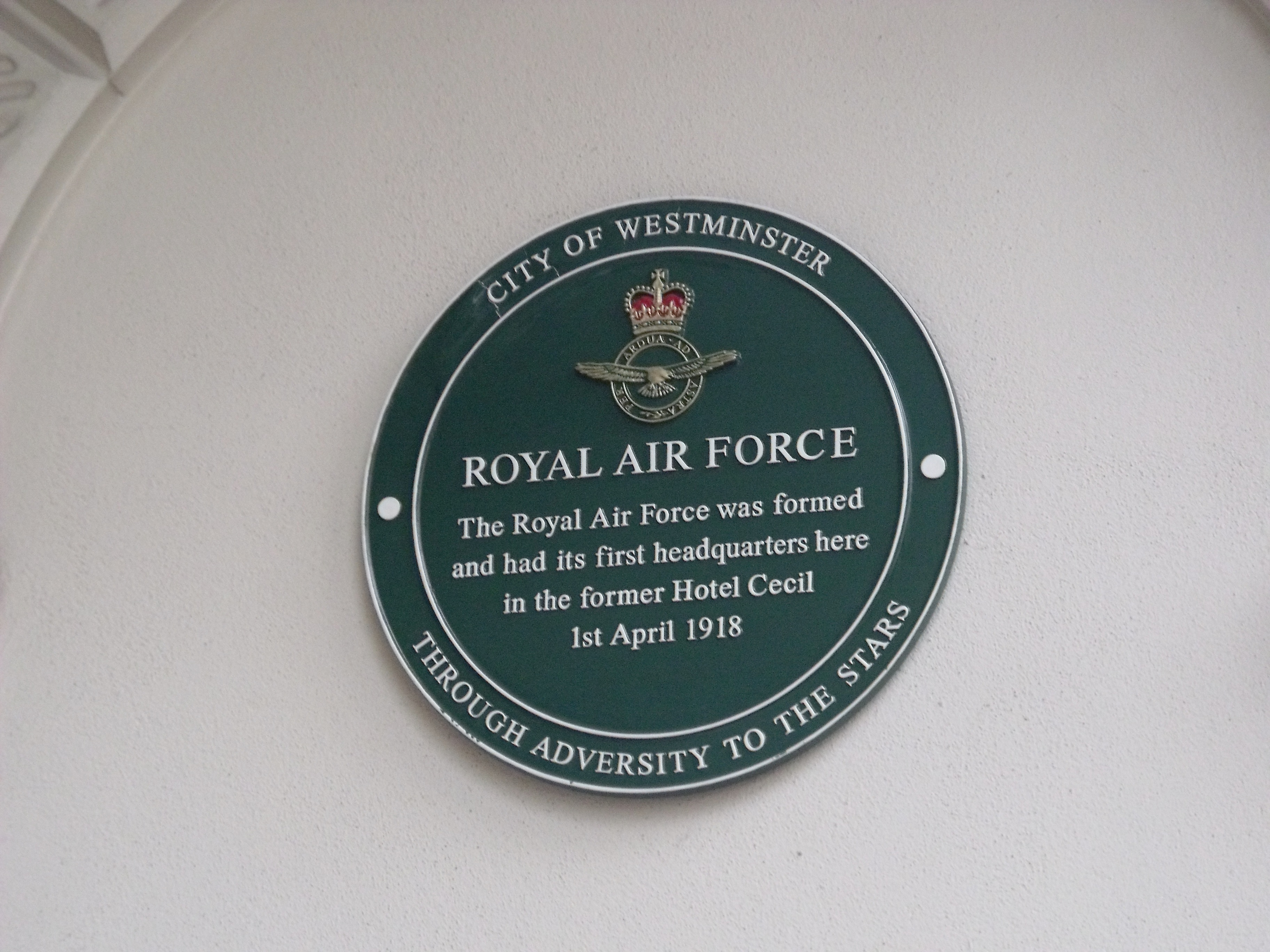
The green plaque marking the formation of the Royal Air Force

During World War II, the building became home to the Ministry of Supply, which coordinated the supply of equipment to the national armed forces. It was also the home of the Petroleum Board, which handled the distribution of petroleum products during the war. It was badly damaged by a bomb in 1940.

The building reverted to Shell-Mex & BP on 1 July 1948, with many floors remaining occupied by the Ministry of Aviation (latterly the Board of Trade, Civil Aviation Division) until the mid-1970s. During this time, until the department's move to the present location in Farnborough, the building was also the headquarters for the Air Accidents Investigation Branch.

On 17 May 2006, The Times reported that the building was for sale and that the Indian-Kenyan Kandhari family was the front-runner in the battle to buy it from the existing owners, Vincent and Robert Tchenguiz. The Kandharis were said to have offered £530 million for the building, but they were competing with other interested groups, including Menorah, the Israeli insurer, an Irish company, and several British companies. An offer believed to be for £520 million ($1.02 billion) was made in December 2006 by Istithmar, the investment agency of the Dubai government, which withdrew its offer before completion. The property was subsequently sold in July 2007 to a fund managed by Westbrook Partners for £988 million.
