= Alfred Faulkner =

British civil servant

Sir Alfred Edward Faulkner, CB, CBE (3 July 1882 – 15 July 1963) was a British civil servant.

== Career ==
He was born in Tottenham, the son of a grocer and was awarded a foundation scholarship to St Albans School in 1894. When he left school, he was appointed a boy copyist in the civil service. He was appointed as a supernumary clerk in the second division (known as a Ridley clerk ) in civil service in 1901. He was assigned to the Admiralty. and obtained a substantive post in 1908, and appointment as an assistant transport clerk in 1910.

Following the Agadir Crisis in 1911, he worked under Graeme Thomson on the plans for getting the British Expeditionary Force to France in the event of war. The result of their work was that in the British Expeditionary Force was speedily deployed to France after World War I broke out. Like Thomson he moved to the Ministry of Shipping on its formation.

In the 1920s, he was successively Director of Sea Transport at the Board of Trade, Under-Secretary for Mines, and Under-Secretary for Petroleum. Following his formal retirement, he served as director of producer gas vehicles and then Transport Commissioner for the Eastern Region.

He was appointed a Companion of the Order of the Bath (CB) in the 1924 Birthday Honours.

He died in Bournemouth in July 1963 at the age of 81.
