= Shell-Mex and BP =

British joint venture between petroleum companies Shell and BP

Shell-Mex and BP Limited

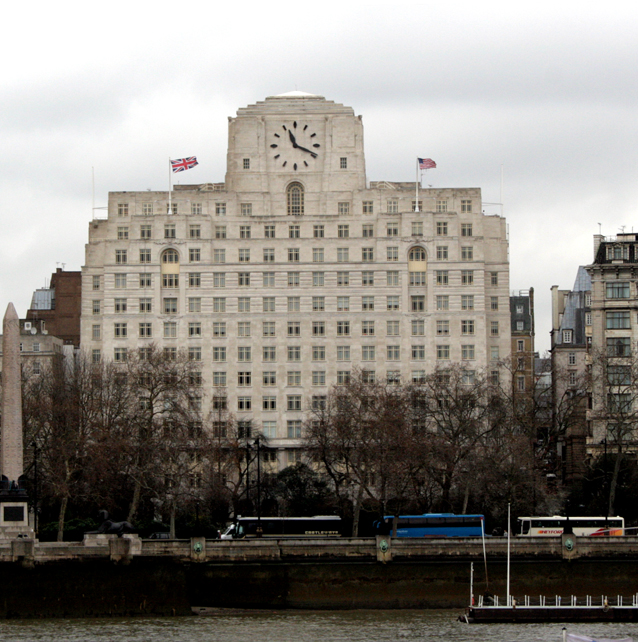
- The head office at Shell Mex House
- Company type: Joint venture
- Industry: Petroleum
- Founded: 1932
- Defunct: 1976; 49 years ago
- Headquarters: Shell Mex House, London, England
- Owners: Shell; BP

Shell-Mex and BP Limited was a British joint venture between petroleum companies Shell and BP. It was formed in 1932 when both companies decided to merge their United Kingdom marketing operations, partly in response to the difficult economic conditions of the times.

The parent organisations demerged their United Kingdom marketing operations in 1976. The announcement of this action was as follows:

Since 1932 the products of Shell and BP have been marketed in the UK through the agency of Shell-Mex and BP Ltd. In that year the company's business amounted to about three million tons, out of a total UK market of some seven million tons.

The activities of this most successful enterprise have extended greatly over the years. In 1970 Shell-Mex and BP Ltd. supplied 40 million tons of the UK petroleum market, amounting to a total of 100 million tons.

In the majority of countries outside the UK. Shell and BP have always each marketed their products through their own entirely separate organisations and it has been decided that Shell and BP marketing operations in the UK should now be brought more into line with this pattern over the next 4–5 years.

Since 1966, the Shell and the BP service station networks have been managed by separate sales organisations within Shell-Mex and BP. It is now proposed to extend this 'brand streaming' progressively to cover all products and all market sectors. This will ultimately lead to the establishment of two viable marketing organisations within Shell-Mex and BP thus facilitating the termination of the agency agreement.

The National Benzole Company will continue to trade under the National brand and will form part of the BP marketing organisation.

The Supply, Storage and Delivery functions, and the Computer and other services, will be the object of further detailed study once brand streaming of direct trade is substantially complete and a plan for the treatment of Authorised Distributors is agreed. Should it be decided that these functions should continue for a period after the transfer of the sales activities, then these will continue to be carried out by Shell-Mex and BP.

The employees of Shell-Mex and BP. will be redeployed within the separate marketing organisations and redundancies will not arise as a result of this re-organisation.

The company's head office was at Shell Mex House on London's Strand.

== Other companies acquired by Shell-Mex and BP ==
- 1934 Dominion Motor Spirit
- 1957 National Benzole
