= Secretary for Petroleum =

The position of Secretary for Petroleum was an office in the United Kingdom Government, associated with the Board of Trade.

In 1929, the Secretary for Mines (now also defunct) took over responsibility for petroleum.

In 1939 the Petroleum Board assumed responsibility for the coordination of the petroleum 'pool' for oil supplies (except oil for the Royal Navy).

In 1940, the department was divided with Geoffrey Lloyd and Sir Alfred Faulkner becoming respectively Secretary and Permanent Under-Secretary for Petroleum and David Grenfell and Sir Alfred Hurst respectively Secretary and Permanent Under-Secretary for Mines.

On 11 June 1942, both these sub-departments of the Board of Trade were transferred to the new Ministry of Fuel and Power, then later the Department of Trade and Industry.

In 1945, the post of Secretary for Petroleum, which had only existed for a few years, was "abandoned".

== Secretaries for Petroleum 1940-1942 ==
Name	Entered office	Left office
Geoffrey Lloyd	15 May 1940	1942

== See also ==
- Energy law
- Energy minister
- List of energy regulatory bodies
- Minister of State for Energy (UK)
