= Parliamentary Under-Secretary of State for the Home Department =

Ministerial position in the Government of the United Kingdom

United Kingdom Parliamentary Under-Secretary of State for the Home Department
- Royal Arms of His Majesty's Government

- Flag of the United Kingdom

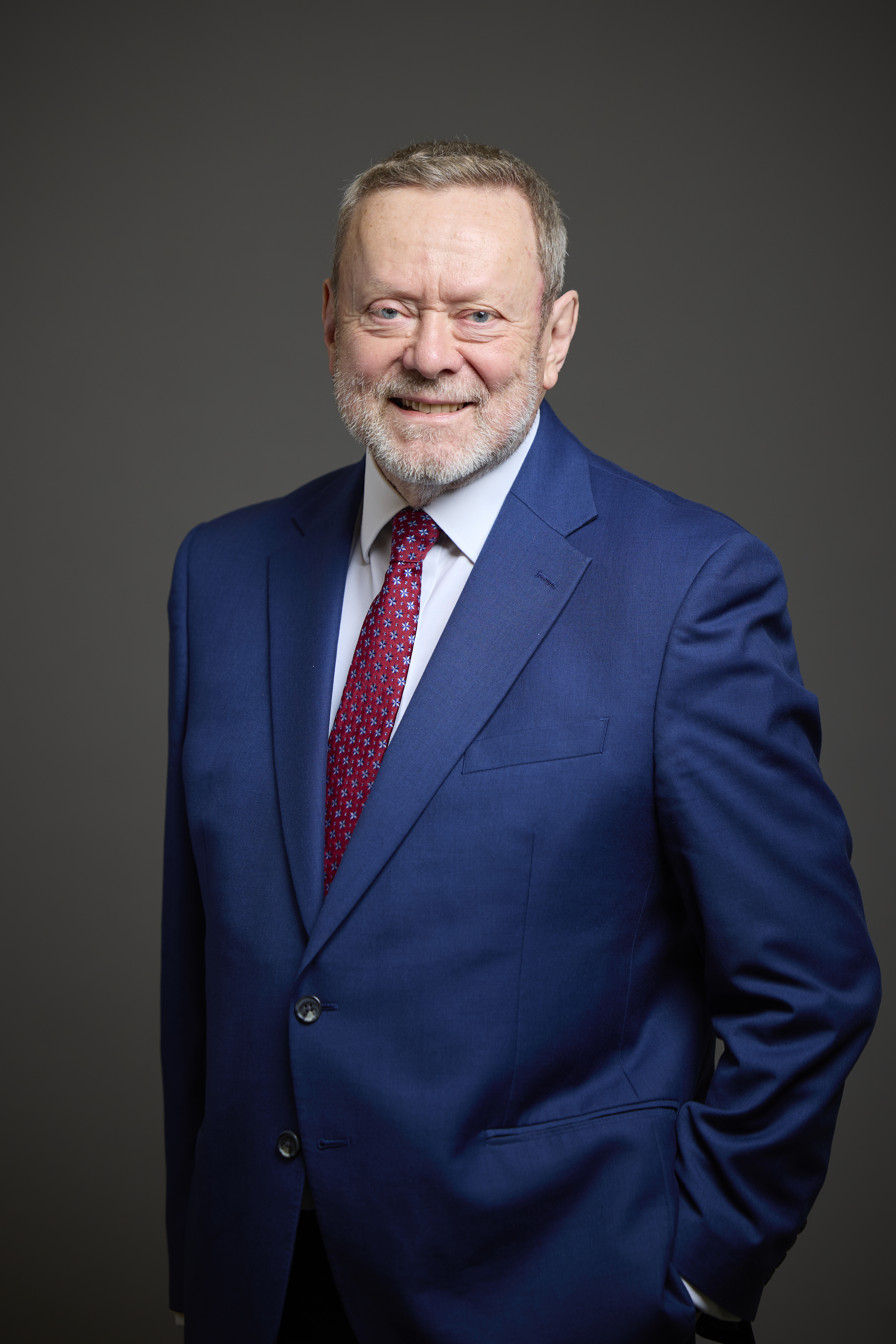
- Incumbent; Ray Collins, Baron Collins of Highbury since 22 July 2026
- Home Office
- Type: Minister of the Crown
- Status: Parliamentary Under-Secretary of State
- Member of: His Majesty's Government
- Reports to: Home Secretary
- Seat: Westminster
- Nominator: Prime Minister
- Appointer: The Monarch; (on the advice of the Prime Minister)
- Term length: At His Majesty's pleasure
- Formation: 6 May 1979
- First holder: Tim Raison
- Salary: £115,824 per annum (2022) (including £86,584 MP salary)
- Website: Official Website

This article lists past and present parliamentary under-secretaries of state serving the home secretary of the United Kingdom at the Home Office.

== Non-permanent and parliamentary under-secretaries, 1782–present ==
- April 1782: Evan Nepean
- April 1782: Thomas Orde
- July 1782: Henry Strachey
- April 1783: George North
- February 1784: John Townshend, 2nd Viscount Sydney
- June 1789: Scrope Bernard
- July 1794: Thomas Brodrick
- March 1796: Charles Greville
- March 1798: William Wickham
- February 1801: Edward Finch-Hatton
- August 1801: Sir George Shee, 1st Baronet
- August 1803: Reginald Pole Carew
- July 1804: John Henry Smyth
- February 1806: Charles Williams-Wynn
- November 1807: Charles Cecil Cope Jenkinson
- February 1810: Henry Goulburn
- August 1812: John Hiley Addington
- April 1818: Henry Clive
- January 1822: George Robert Dawson
- April 1827: Spencer Perceval
- July 1827: Thomas Spring Rice
- January 1828: William Yates Peel
- August 1830: Sir George Clerk, 6th Baronet
- November 1830: George Lamb
- January 1834: Henry Grey, Viscount Howick
- July 1834: Edward Stanley
- January 1835: William Gregson
- April 1835: Fox Maule
- June 1841: Edward Seymour, Baron Seymour
- September 1841: John Manners-Sutton
- July 1846: Sir William Somerville, 5th Baronet
- July 1847: Sir Denis Le Marchant, 1st Baronet
- May 1848: Sir George Cornewall Lewis, 2nd Baronet
- July 1850: Edward Pleydell-Bouverie
- February 1852: Sir William Jolliffe, 1st Baronet
- December 1852: Henry Fitzroy
- February 1855: William Cowper
- August 1855: William Nathaniel Massey
- February 1858: Gathorne Hardy
- June 1859: George Clive
- November 1862: Henry Bruce
- April 1864: Thomas Baring
- May 1866: Edward Knatchbull-Hugessen
- July 1866: Somerset Lowry-Corry, 4th Earl Belmore
- August 1867: Sir James Fergusson, 6th Baronet
- August 1868: Sir Michael Hicks Beach, 9th Baronet
- December 1868: Edward Knatchbull-Hugessen
- January 1871: George Shaw-Lefevre
- March 1871: Henry Winterbotham
- February 1874: Sir Henry Selwin-Ibbetson, 7th Baronet
- April 1878: Sir Matthew White Ridley, 5th Baronet
- April 1880: Arthur Peel
- January 1881: Leonard Courtney
- August 1881: Archibald Primrose, 5th Earl of Rosebery
- June 1883: J. T. Hibbert
- December 1884: Henry Fowler
- June 1885: Charles Stuart-Wortley
- February 1886: Henry Broadhurst
- August 1886: Charles Stuart-Wortley
- August 1892: Herbert Gladstone
- March 1894: George W. E. Russell
- June 1895: Jesse Collings
- August 1902: Thomas Cochrane
- December 1905: Herbert Samuel
- July 1909: Charles Masterman
- February 1912: Ellis Ellis-Griffith
- February 1915: Cecil Harmsworth
- May 1915: William Brace
- January 1919: Sir Hamar Greenwood
- April 1919: John Baird
- October 1922: George Frederick Stanley
- March 1923: Godfrey Locker-Lampson
- January 1924: Rhys Davies
- November 1924: Godfrey Locker-Lampson
- December 1925: Douglas Hacking
- November 1927: Sir Vivian Henderson
- June 1929: Alfred Short
- September 1931: Oliver Stanley
- February 1933: Douglas Hacking
- June 1935: Harry Crookshank
- June 1934: Euan Wallace
- November 1935: Geoffrey Lloyd
- June 1939: Osbert Peake (check date)
- October 1944: Geoffrey FitzClarence, 5th Earl of Munster
- August 1945: George Oliver
- October 1947: Kenneth Younger
- March 1950: Geoffrey de Freitas
- November 1951: David Llewellyn (to Oct 1952)
- February 1952: Sir Hugh Lucas-Tooth, 1st Baronet (to Dec 1955)
- November 1952: Alexander Lloyd, 2nd Baron Lloyd (to October 1954)
- October 1954: Stormont Mancroft, 2nd Baron Mancroft
- January 1957: Patricia Hornsby-Smith (jointly) (to October 1959)
- January 1957: Jocelyn Simon (jointly) (to January 1958)
- January 1958: David Renton (jointly) (to June 1961)
- October 1959: Dennis Vosper (jointly) (to October 1960)
- February 1961: Henry Bathurst, 8th Earl Bathurst (jointly) (to July 1962)
- June 1961: Charles Fletcher-Cooke (jointly) (to February 1963)
- July 1962: Christopher Montague Woodhouse (jointly) (to October 1964)
- March 1963: Mervyn Pike (jointly) (to October 1964)
- October 1964: Victor Collins, Baron Stonham (jointly) (to August 1967)
- October 1964: George Thomas (jointly) (to April 1966)
- April 1966: Maurice Foley (jointly) (to January 1967)
- April 1966: Dick Taverne (jointly) (to April 1968)
- January 1967: David Ennals (jointly) (to November 1968)
- April 1968: Elystan Morgan (jointly) (to June 1970)
- November 1968: Merlyn Rees (jointly) (to June 1970)
- June 1970: Mark Carlisle
- April 1972: David Lane
- March 1974: Shirley Summerskill (to 1979)
- May 1979: John Ganzoni, 2nd Baron Belstead
- April 1982: Rodney Elton, 2nd Baron Elton (to September 1984)
- January 1983: David Mellor (to September 1986)
- March 1984: Simon Arthur, 4th Baron Glenarthur (to September 1986)
- September 1986: Douglas Hogg
- July 1989: Peter Lloyd
- April 1992: Charles Wardle
- July 1994: Nicholas Baker
- October 1995: Timothy Kirkhope (to May 1997)
- November 1995: Tom Sackville (jointly) (to May 1997)
- May 1997: Gareth Williams, Baron Williams of Mostyn (jointly) (to July 1998)
- May 1997: George Howarth (jointly) (to July 1999)
- May 1997: Mike O'Brien (jointly) (to June 2001)
- July 1998: Kate Hoey (jointly) (to July 1999)
- July 1999: Steve Bassam, Baron Bassam of Brighton (jointly) (to June 2001)
- June 2001: Beverley Hughes (jointly) (to May 2002)
- June 2001: Bob Ainsworth (jointly) (to June 2003)
- June 2001: Angela Eagle (jointly) (to May 2002)
- May 2002: Geoffrey Filkin, Baron Filkin (jointly) (to June 2003)
- June 2002: Michael Wills (jointly) (to July 2003)
- May 2003: Paul Goggins (jointly) (to May 2005)
- June 2003: Caroline Flint (jointly) (to April 2005)
- June 2003: Fiona Mactaggart (jointly) (to April 2005)
- May 2005: Andy Burnham (jointly) (to May 2006)
- 5 May 2006: Joan Ryan (to 29 June 2007)
- 28 June 2007: Meg Hillier (to 12 May 2010)
- 12 May 2010: Lynne Featherstone (to 4 September 2012)
- 4 September 2012: John Taylor, Baron Taylor of Holbeach (to 6 August 2014)
- 6 August 2014: Michael Bates, Baron Bates (to 14 May 2015)
- 11 May 2015: Tariq Ahmad, Baron Ahmad of Wimbledon (to 13 July 2016)
- 22 July 2026: Ray Collins, Baron Collins of Highbury

== Parliamentary secretaries, 1940–1945 ==
- May 1940: William Mabane (to June 1942)
- October 1940: Ellen Wilkinson (to May 1945)

== See also ==
- List of permanent under secretaries of state of the Home Office
- Under-Secretary of State for Foreign Affairs
- Undersecretary
