= Harry Crookshank =

British Conservative politician (1893–1961)

The Right Honourable The Viscount Crookshank CH PC
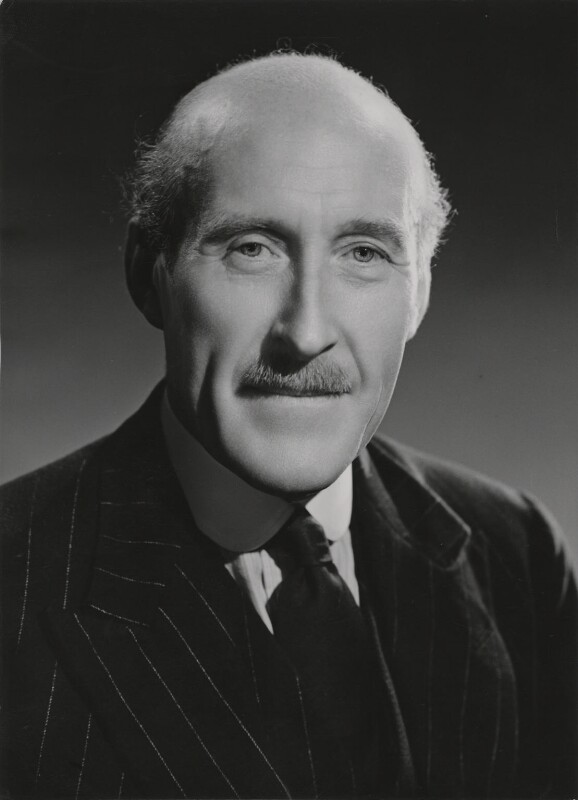
- Crookshank in 1946

Minister of Health
- In office 30 October 1951 – 7 May 1952
- Prime Minister: Winston Churchill
- Preceded by: Hilary Marquand
- Succeeded by: Iain Macleod

Leader of the House of Commons
- In office 30 October 1951 – 20 December 1955
- Prime Minister: Winston Churchill; Sir Anthony Eden
- Preceded by: James Chuter Ede
- Succeeded by: Rab Butler

Personal details
- Born: 27 May 1893 Cairo, Khedivate of Egypt
- Died: 17 October 1961 (aged 68) Chelsea, London
- Party: Conservative
- Education: Magdalen College, Oxford

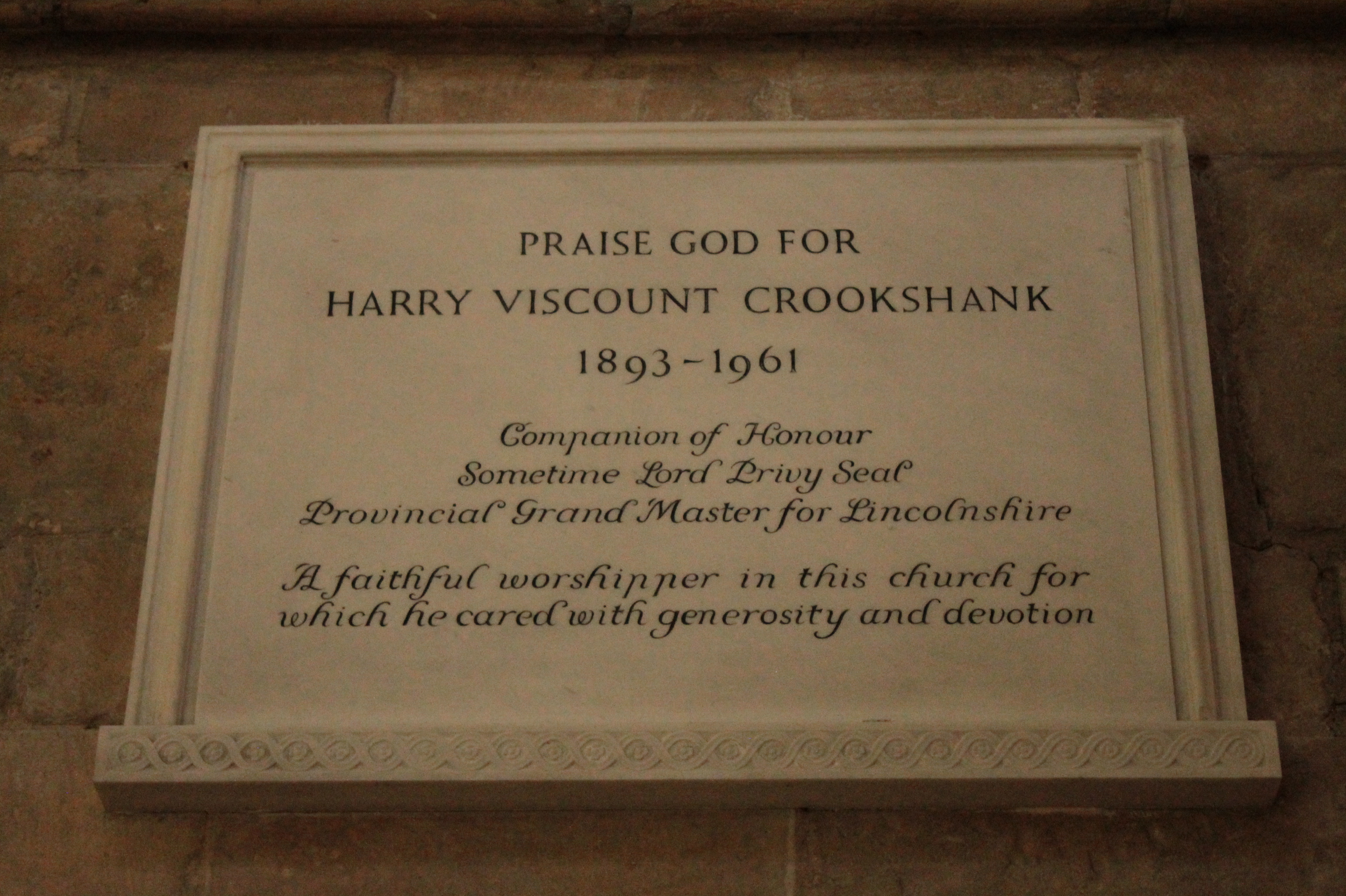
Memorial to Viscount Harry Crookshank, Lincoln Cathedral

Harry Frederick Comfort Crookshank, 1st Viscount Crookshank, CH, PC (27 May 1893 – 17 October 1961), was a British Conservative politician. He was Minister of Health between 1951 and 1952 and Leader of the House of Commons between 1951 and 1955.

== Background and education ==
Crookshank was born in Cairo, Egypt, the son of Harry Maule Crookshank and Emma, daughter of Major Samuel Comfort, of New York City. On his father's side, he descended from Alexander Crookshank, of County Longford, Ireland, who represented Belfast in the Irish House of Commons and served as a Justice of the Court of Common Pleas in Ireland. He was educated at Eton and Magdalen College, Oxford. In the First World War, he joined the Hampshire Regiment and served as a captain in the Grenadier Guards. On one occasion he was buried alive by an explosion for twenty minutes, and on another in 1916 he was castrated by shrapnel, requiring him to wear a surgical truss for the rest of his life. He was awarded by Serbia the Order of the White Eagle and Gold Medal for Valour.

He joined the Diplomatic Service in 1919 and worked at the British Embassy in Washington, D.C., until 1924.

== Political career ==
Crookshank was elected Member of Parliament (MP) for Gainsborough in 1924, a seat he held for the next 32 years. He entered the government as Under-Secretary of State for the Home Department in 1934 under Ramsay MacDonald. When Stanley Baldwin became prime minister in 1935 Crookshank was appointed Secretary for Mines, a post he retained when Neville Chamberlain became prime minister in 1937 until February 1939. Crookshank called Chamberlain "crazed and hypnotised by a loony" to have accepted the Munich Agreement and sent a letter of resignation in protest, but was convinced to rescind it. In the latter year, he was sworn of the Privy Council and made Financial Secretary to the Treasury. He continued in this post also when Winston Churchill came to power in 1940, and was then Postmaster General under Churchill between 1943 and 1945. In 1942 he was offered the post of British Minister Resident in the Mediterranean at Algiers following the liberation of Algeria by Operation Torch but he declined, Harold Macmillan being appointed instead.

When the Conservatives returned to office under Churchill in 1951, Crookshank was appointed Minister of Health and Leader of the House of Commons, with a seat in the cabinet. In 1952 exchanged his post at the Ministry of Health for the sinecure post of Lord Privy Seal, while he remained as Commons Leader. He continued in these two positions until December 1955, the last year under the premiership of Sir Anthony Eden. In the 1955 New Year Honours he was made a Member of the Order of the Companions of Honour. He retired from the House of Commons in 1956 and was raised to the peerage as the Viscount Crookshank, of Gainsborough in the County of Lincoln, in January of that year. He had been offered a peerage in February 1940 but declined, having considered it at the time an insult because his First World War wounds had left him incapable of fathering any heir to a title.

Papers released by The National Archives, London, November 2007, show that Crookshank, with Harold Macmillan, led a faction within the third Churchill ministry who opposed what they perceived to be an attempt to bounce the Cabinet into a premature decision to authorise a British thermonuclear bomb programme in July 1954.

== Personal life ==
Lord Crookshank was a Scottish Rite Freemason and Grand Master of Lincolnshire.

Incapable as result of his First World War wounds of fathering children, Crookshank was a lifelong bachelor. He was also (not publicly) known as a homosexual and caused a near scandal when a male lover of his was adopted as Conservative Party candidate for the Grimsby constituency in 1958 but later withdrawn. According to Chris Bryant he was a member of the Glamour Boys.

His home from 1937 was at 51 Pont Street, Kensington, London, where in 1947 he hosted a meeting of like-minded backbench MPs who unsuccessfully demanded Churchill's removal as Leader of the Conservative Party.

He died of cancer at Chelsea, London, in October 1961, aged 68. The viscountcy died with him. Having been since 1960 High Steward of the City of Westminster, his funeral service took place at Westminster Abbey, followed by burial at Lincoln Cathedral. His sister, Helen Elizabeth Comfort Crookshank (1895–1948), lies next to him.

Coat of arms of Harry Crookshank
Crest A dexter cubit arm in armour the hand naked holding a dagger in bend sinister Proper hilt and pommel Or. Escutcheon Or three boars' heads erased Sable armed and langued Azure a bordure of the second. Motto Conferre Gladio

== Books cited ==
- Ball, Simon (2004). The Guardsmen. London: HarperCollins. ISBN 978-0-00-257110-4. (a joint biography of Harold Macmillan, Lord Salisbury, Oliver Lyttelton and Crookshank)

Parliament of the United Kingdom
Preceded by Sir Richard Winfrey	Member of Parliament for Gainsborough; 1924–1956	Succeeded by Marcus Kimball
Political offices
Preceded by Douglas Hacking	Under-Secretary of State for the Home Department; 1934–1935	Succeeded by Euan Wallace
Preceded by Ernest Brown	Secretary for Mines; 1935–1939	Succeeded by Geoffrey Lloyd
Preceded by Euan Wallace	Financial Secretary to the Treasury; 1939–1943	Succeeded by Ralph Assheton
Preceded by William Morrison	Postmaster General; 1943–1945	Succeeded by The Earl of Listowel
Preceded by Hilary Marquand	Minister of Health; 1951–1952	Succeeded by Iain Macleod
Preceded by Chuter Ede	Leader of the House of Commons; 1951–1955	Succeeded by Rab Butler
Preceded by The Marquess of Salisbury	Lord Privy Seal; 1952–1955	Succeeded by Rab Butler
Peerage of the United Kingdom
New creation	Viscount Crookshank; 1956–1961	Extinct
