= Geoffrey Lloyd, Baron Geoffrey-Lloyd =

British politician (1902–1984)

The Right Honourable The Lord Geoffrey-Lloyd PC
- Lloyd in 1938

Minister of Education
- In office 17 September 1957 – 14 October 1959
- Prime Minister: Harold Macmillan
- Preceded by: The Viscount Hailsham
- Succeeded by: Sir David Eccles
Junior Ministerial offices
Minister of Fuel and Power
In office 31 October 1951 – 20 December 1955
Prime Minister	Winston Churchill; Anthony Eden
Preceded by	Philip Noel-Baker
Succeeded by	Derick Heathcoat-Amory
Minister for Information
In office 23 May 1945 – 26 July 1945
Prime Minister	Winston Churchill
Preceded by	Brendan Bracken
Succeeded by	Ted Williams
Parliamentary Secretary to the Ministry of Power (Note: Secretary for Petroleum Before 3 June 1942)
In office 15 May 1940 – 23 May 1945
Prime Minister	Winston Churchill
Preceded by	New Office
Succeeded by	Austin Hudson
Secretary for Mines
In office 21 April 1939 – 15 May 1940
Prime Minister	Neville Chamberlain
Preceded by	Harry Crookshank
Succeeded by	David Grenfell
Under-Secretary of State for the Home Department
In office 28 November 1935 – 21 April 1939
Prime Minister	Stanley Baldwin; Neville Chamberlain
Preceded by	Harry Crookshank
Succeeded by	Osbert Peake
Parliamentary offices
Member of the House of Lords; Lord Temporal
In office 6 May 1974 – 12 September 1984; Life peerage
Member of Parliament for Sutton Coldfield
In office 26 May 1955 – 7 February 1974
Preceded by	John Mellor
Succeeded by	Norman Fowler
Member of Parliament for Birmingham King's Norton
In office 23 February 1950 – 6 May 1955
Preceded by	Constituency redrawn
Succeeded by	Constituency abolished
Member of Parliament for Birmingham Ladywood
In office 27 October 1931 – 15 June 1945
Preceded by	Wilfrid Whiteley
Succeeded by	Victor Yates

Personal details
- Born: Geoffrey William Geoffrey-Lloyd; 17 January 1902 London, England, UK
- Died: 12 September 1984 (aged 82) London, England, UK
- Party: Conservative
- Education: Harrow School
- Alma mater: Trinity College, Cambridge

Geoffrey William Geoffrey-Lloyd, Baron Geoffrey-Lloyd, PC (born Geoffrey William Lloyd; 17 January 1902 – 12 September 1984), was a British Conservative politician. He was a Member of Parliament across three different constituencies from 1931 to 1945, and from 1950 to 1974, and served in several ministerial roles in the 1940s and 1950s.

== Early life and career ==
The eldest son of G. W. A. Lloyd of Newbury, Geoffrey William Lloyd was born in Paddington on 17 January 1902. He was educated at Harrow School and Trinity College, Cambridge (MA), during which time he was president of the Cambridge Union Society in 1925.

== Political career ==
Lloyd contested South East Southwark in 1924 without success and Birmingham Ladywood in 1929, when he was defeated by just 11 votes. He was private secretary to Sir Samuel Hoare (secretary of state for air), 1926–1929, then to Stanley Baldwin (prime minister, 1929, subsequently as Leader of the Opposition), 1929–1931.

He was elected as member of parliament (MP) for Birmingham Ladywood in 1931 with a 14,000 majority, holding the seat until his defeat in 1945. He was parliamentary private secretary to Stanley Baldwin (Lord President of the Council), 1931–1935 and as prime minister in 1935. He held office as under-secretary of state for the Home Department, 1935–1939; as secretary for mines, 1939–1940; as secretary for petroleum, 1940–1942; as chairman of the Oil Control Board, 1939–1945; as minister in charge of Petroleum Warfare Department 1940–1945, as parliamentary secretary to the Ministry of Fuel and Power, 1942–1945; and as minister of information in 1945. He was appointed a privy counsellor in 1943.

He was a governor of British Broadcasting Corporation from 1946 to 1949. He returned to Parliament as member for Birmingham King's Norton from 1950 to 1955, when the seat was abolished by boundary changes. He was then the MP for Sutton Coldfield from 1955 until February 1974. During this time he was minister of fuel and power, 1951–1955 and minister of education from 1957 to 1959.

He changed his surname from Lloyd to Geoffrey-Lloyd by deed poll on 18 April 1974.

He was created a life peer 6 May 1974 as Baron Geoffrey-Lloyd, of Broomfield in the County of Kent. Broomfield was chosen because of Leeds Castle; he was a longtime friend of its owner, Olive, Lady Baillie, and after she died later that year, he was named chairman of the castle's trust.

== Death ==
Lord Geoffrey-Lloyd died at his home in Westminster on 12 September 1984, at the age of 82.

== Note ==
Parliament of the United Kingdom
Preceded by Wilfrid Whiteley	Member of Parliament for Birmingham Ladywood; 1931–1945	Succeeded by Victor Yates
Preceded by Raymond Blackburn	Member of Parliament for Birmingham King's Norton; 1950–1955	Constituency abolished
Preceded by Sir John Mellor, Bt	Member of Parliament for Sutton Coldfield; 1955 – February 1974	Succeeded by Norman Fowler
Political offices
Preceded by Harry Crookshank	Under-Secretary of State for the Home Department; 1935–1939	Succeeded by Osbert Peake
Preceded by Harry Crookshank	Secretary for Mines; 1939–1940	Succeeded by David Grenfell
New ministerial post	Secretary for Petroleum; 1940–1942	Combined into Minister for Fuel and Power
Preceded by Himself as Secretary for Petroleum	Parliamentary Secretary to the Ministry of Power; 1942–1945; With: Tom Smith	Succeeded by Sir Austin Hudson, Bt
Preceded by Brendan Bracken	Minister for Information; May–July 1945	Succeeded by Edward Williams
Preceded by Philip Noel-Baker	Minister of Fuel and Power; 1951–1955	Succeeded by Derick Heathcoat-Amory
Preceded by The Viscount Hailsham	Minister of Education; 1957–1959	Succeeded by Sir David Eccles
