= Secretary for Mines =

The position of Secretary for Mines was an office in the United Kingdom Government, associated with the Board of Trade.

In 1929, the department took over responsibility for petroleum.

In 1940, the department was divided with Geoffrey Lloyd and Sir Alfred Faulkner becoming respectively Secretary and Permanent Under-Secretary for Petroleum and David Grenfell and Sir Alfred Hurst respectively Secretary and Permanent Under-Secretary for Mines.

On 11 June 1942, both these sub-departments of the Board of Trade were transferred to the new Ministry of Fuel and Power, which itself has been merged into later departments.

== Secretaries for Mines, 1920–1945 ==
Name	Term of office		Political party
William Bridgeman	22 August 1920	6 November 1922	Conservative
George Lane-Fox	6 November 1922	23 January 1924	Conservative
Manny Shinwell	23 January 1924	11 November 1924	Labour
George Lane-Fox	11 November 1924	13 January 1928	Conservative
Douglas King	13 January 1928	1 June 1929	Conservative
Ben Turner	1 June 1929	5 June 1930	Labour
Manny Shinwell	5 June 1930	3 September 1931	Labour
Isaac Foot	3 September 1931	30 September 1932	Liberal
Ernest Brown	30 September 1932	18 June 1935	Liberal National
Harry Crookshank	18 June 1935	21 April 1939	Conservative
Geoffrey Lloyd	21 April 1939	15 May 1940	Conservative
David Grenfell	15 May 1940	1945	Labour
