= Ministry of Power (United Kingdom) =

Former UK Government department (1942–1969)

Department overview
- Formed: 11 June 1942
- Preceding agencies: Board of Trade; Ministry of War Transport; Secretary for Petroleum; Secretary for Mines
- Dissolved: 6 October 1969
- Superseding Department: Ministry of Technology
- Jurisdiction: United Kingdom

The Ministry of Power was a United Kingdom government ministry dealing with issues concerning energy.

The Ministry of Power (then named Ministry of Fuel and Power) was created on 11 June 1942 from functions separated from the Board of Trade. It took charge of coal production, allocation of fuel supplies, control of energy prices and petrol rationing. These had previously been dealt with by the Secretary for Mines and in the case of petroleum since 1940 by the Secretary for Petroleum. The Petroleum Board, responsible for the coordination of the war-time petroleum 'pool' for oil supplies (except oil for the Royal Navy), continued in this role until the Board was dissolved in 1948. It also took over responsibility for electricity from the Ministry of War Transport and its predecessor the Ministry of Transport.

The Ministry of Fuel and Power was renamed the Ministry of Power in January 1957. The Ministry of Power later became part of the Ministry of Technology on 6 October 1969, which merged into the Department of Trade and Industry on 20 October 1970. In 1974, its responsibilities were split out to form the Department of Energy, and then merged back into DTI in 1992; a separate Department of Energy and Climate Change was created in 2008 and then merged back in 2016 to the Department for Business, Energy and Industrial Strategy. In 2023 functions where split again into a newly created Department for Energy Security and Net Zero.

Those who worked at the Ministry include:

- Arthur Boissier, Director of Public Relations (1943–1945) and formerly Headmaster of Harrow School.
- Maurice Bridgeman, Principal Assistant Secretary in the Petroleum Division (1944–1946).
- Sir Donald Fergusson, Permanent Secretary (1945–1952).
- John Maud, later Lord Redcliffe-Maud, civil servant (1952–1958).
- Harold Wilson, Director of Economics and Statistics (1943–1944) and later Prime Minister.
- Malcolm Patrick Murray, Under Secretary in the Electricity Division (1946–1959).

== Ministers ==
=== Fuel and power ===
Name	Took office	Left office	Political party	Notes
Gwilym Lloyd George	3 June 1942	26 July 1945	Liberal	
Emanuel Shinwell	3 August 1945	7 October 1947	Labour	
Hugh Gaitskell	7 October 1947	28 February 1950	Labour	Office no longer in Cabinet
Philip Noel-Baker	28 February 1950	31 October 1951	Labour	
Geoffrey Lloyd	31 October 1951	20 December 1955	Conservative	
Aubrey Jones	20 December 1955	13 January 1957	Conservative	

=== Power ===
Name	Took office	Left office	Political party	Notes
The Lord Mills	13 January 1957	14 October 1959	Conservative	
Richard Wood	14 October 1959	20 October 1963	Conservative	Office not in Cabinet
Frederick Erroll	20 October 1963		Conservative	Office back in Cabinet
Fred Lee	18 October 1964	6 April 1966	Labour	
Richard Marsh	6 April 1966	6 April 1968	Labour	
Ray Gunter	6 April 1968	1 July 1968	Labour	
Roy Mason	1 July 1968	6 October 1969	Labour	Office abolished: Amalgamated with Ministry of Technology

== Parliamentary secretaries ==
Name	Took office	Left office	Party	Notes
Geoffrey Lloyd	3 June 1942	23 May 1945	Conservative	Jointly
Tom Smith	3 June 1942	23 May 1945	Labour	Jointly
Sir Austin Hudson, Bt	26 May 1945	26 July 1945	Conservative	
William Foster	4 August 1945	10 May 1946	Labour	
Hugh Gaitskell	10 May 1946	7 October 1947	Labour	
Alfred Robens	7 October 1947	26 April 1951	Labour	
Harold Neal	26 April 1951	31 October 1951	Labour	
Lancelot Joynson-Hicks	5 November 1951	20 December 1955	Conservative	
David Lockhart-Mure Renton	20 December 1955		Conservative	
David Renton	18 January 1957	17 January 1958	Conservative	To Ministry of Power
Sir Ian Horobin	17 January 1958	22 October 1959	Conservative	
John George	22 October 1959	25 June 1962	Conservative	
John Peyton	25 June 1962	18 October 1964	Conservative	
John Morris	21 October 1964	10 January 1966	Labour	
Lord Lindgren	10 January 1966	6 April 1966	Labour	
Jeremy Bray	6 April 1966	7 January 1967	Labour	
Reginald Freeson	7 January 1967	6 October 1969	Labour	Office abolished

== See also ==
- Department of Energy (United Kingdom)
