= Secretary of State for Work and Pensions =

Member of the Cabinet of the United Kingdom

United Kingdom Secretary of State for Work and Pensions
- Royal Arms of His Majesty's Government

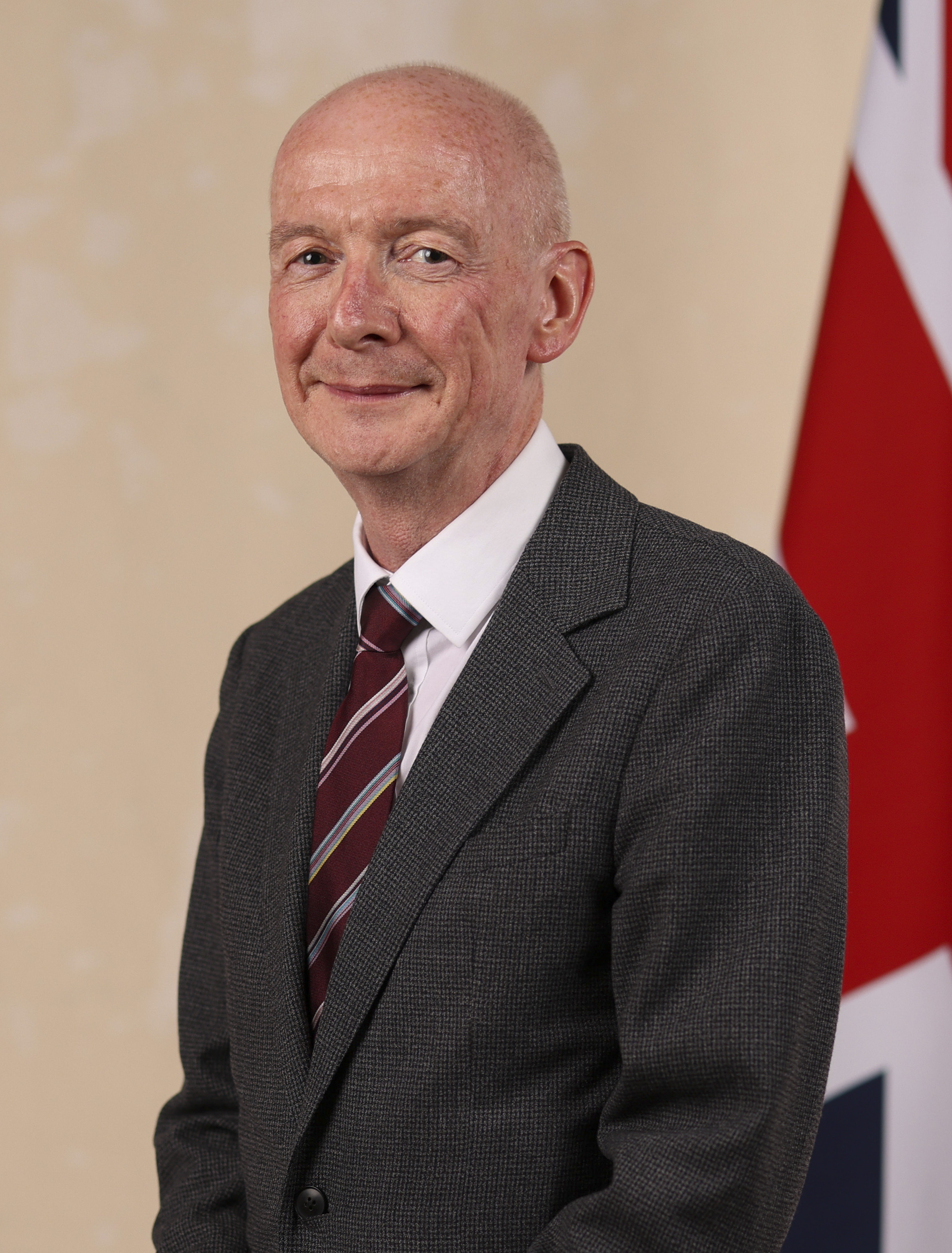
- Incumbent; Pat McFadden since 5 September 2025
- Department for Work and Pensions
- Style: Work and Pensions Secretary (informal); The Right Honourable (within the UK and Commonwealth)
- Type: Minister of the Crown
- Status: Secretary of State
- Member of: Cabinet; Privy Council
- Reports to: The Prime Minister
- Seat: Westminster
- Nominator: The Prime Minister
- Appointer: The Monarch; (on the advice of the Prime Minister)
- Term length: At His Majesty's Pleasure
- Formation: 10 December 1916: (as Minister for Pensions); 8 June 2001: (as Secretary of State for Work and Pensions)
- First holder: George Barnes(as Minister for Pensions)
- Deputy: Minister of State for Employment
- Salary: £159,038 per annum (2022) (including £86,584 MP salary)
- Website: gov.uk/government/ministers/secretary-of-state-for-work-and-pensions

The secretary of state for work and pensions, also referred to as the work and pensions secretary, is a secretary of state in the Government of the United Kingdom, with overall responsibility for the business of the Department for Work and Pensions. The incumbent is a member of the Cabinet of the United Kingdom.

The office holder works alongside the other work and pensions ministers. The corresponding shadow minister is the shadow secretary of state for work and pensions. The performance of the secretary of state is also scrutinised by the Work and Pensions Select Committee.

The office is currently held by Pat McFadden.

== Responsibilities ==
Corresponding to what is generally known as a labour minister in many other countries, the work and pensions secretary's remit includes:

- Support people of working age
- Oversight of employers and pensions
- Fiscal Consolidation
- Providing support for disability
- Support for families and children

== History ==
It was created on 8 June 2001 by the merger of the employment division of the Department for Education and Employment and the Department of Social Security.

The Ministry of Pensions was created in 1916 to handle the payment of war pensions to former members of the Armed Forces and their dependants. In 1944 a separate Ministry of National Insurance (titled the Ministry of Social Insurance until 17 November 1944) was formed; the two merged in 1953 as the Ministry of Pensions and National Insurance. In 1966 the Ministry was renamed the Ministry of Social Security, but this was short-lived, as the ministry merged with the Ministry of Health in 1968 to form the Department of Health and Social Security. Confusingly, the secretary of state responsible for this department was titled the Secretary of State for Social Services. The department was de-merged in 1988, creating the separate Department of Health and Department of Social Security.

In 2002 the position was incorporated as a corporation sole.

== List of ministers and secretaries of state ==
Colour key (for political parties):
Labour / Conservative / Liberal / National Labour / National Independent

=== Minister of Pensions (1916–1953) ===
Minister	Term of office		Political party	Cabinet
George Nicoll Barnes	10 December 1916	17 August 1917	Labour	Lloyd George
John Hodge	17 August 1917	10 January 1919	Labour	Lloyd George
Laming Worthington-Evans	10 January 1919	2 April 1920	Conservative	Lloyd George
Ian Macpherson	2 April 1920	19 October 1922	Liberal	Lloyd George
George Tryon	31 October 1922	22 January 1924	Conservative	Law
George Tryon	31 October 1922	22 January 1924	Conservative	Baldwin I
Frederick Roberts	23 January 1924	3 November 1924	Labour	MacDonald I
George Tryon	11 November 1924	4 June 1929	Conservative	Baldwin II
Frederick Roberts	7 June 1929	24 August 1931	Labour	MacDonald II
George Tryon	3 September 1931	18 June 1935	Conservative	National I
George Tryon	3 September 1931	18 June 1935	Conservative	National II
Robert Hudson	18 June 1935	30 July 1936	Conservative	National III
Herwald Ramsbotham	30 July 1936	7 June 1939	Conservative	National III
Herwald Ramsbotham	30 July 1936	7 June 1939	Conservative	National IV
Walter Womersley	7 June 1939	26 July 1945	Conservative	Chamberlain War
Walter Womersley	7 June 1939	26 July 1945	Conservative	Churchill War
Walter Womersley	7 June 1939	26 July 1945	Conservative	Churchill Caretaker
Wilfred Paling	3 August 1945	17 April 1947	Labour	Attlee
John Burns Hynd	17 April 1947	7 October 1947	Labour	Attlee
George Buchanan	7 October 1947	2 July 1948	Labour	Attlee
Hilary Marquand	2 July 1948	17 January 1951	Labour	Attlee
George Isaacs	17 January 1951	26 October 1951	Labour	Attlee
Derick Heathcoat-Amory	5 November 1951	3 September 1953	Conservative	Churchill III

=== Minister of Social Insurance/National Insurance (1944–1953) ===
Minister	Term of office		Political party	Cabinet
William Jowitt	8 October 1944	23 May 1945	Labour	Churchill War
Leslie Hore-Belisha	25 May 1945	26 July 1945	National Independent	Churchill Caretaker
Jim Griffiths	4 August 1945	28 February 1950	Labour	Attlee
Edith Summerskill	28 February 1950	26 October 1951	Labour	Attlee
Osbert Peake	31 October 1951	3 September 1953	Conservative	Churchill III
Posts of Minister of Pensions and Minister of National Insurance merged in 1953.

=== Minister of Pensions and National Insurance (1953–1966) ===
Minister	Term of office		Political party	Cabinet
Osbert Peake	3 September 1953	20 December 1955	Conservative	Churchill III
Osbert Peake	3 September 1953	20 December 1955	Conservative	Eden
John Boyd-Carpenter	20 December 1955	16 July 1962	Conservative	Eden
John Boyd-Carpenter	20 December 1955	16 July 1962	Conservative	Macmillan I
John Boyd-Carpenter	20 December 1955	16 July 1962	Conservative	Macmillan II
Niall Macpherson	16 July 1962	21 October 1963	Conservative	Macmillan II
Richard Wood	21 October 1963	16 October 1964	Conservative	Douglas-Home
Margaret Herbison	18 October 1964	6 August 1966	Labour	Wilson I

=== Minister of Social Security (1966–1968) ===
Minister	Term of office		Political party	Cabinet
Margaret Herbison	6 August 1966	26 July 1967	Labour	Wilson II
Judith Hart	26 July 1967	1 November 1968	Labour	Wilson II

=== Secretary of State for Social Services (1968–1988) ===
Secretary of State	Term of office		Political party	Cabinet
Richard Crossman	1 November 1968	19 June 1970	Labour	Wilson II
Keith Joseph	20 June 1970	4 March 1974	Conservative	Heath
Barbara Castle	5 March 1974	8 April 1976	Labour	Wilson III
Barbara Castle	5 March 1974	8 April 1976	Labour	Wilson IV
David Ennals	8 April 1976	4 May 1979	Labour	Callaghan
Patrick Jenkin	5 May 1979	13 September 1981	Conservative	Thatcher I
Norman Fowler	14 September 1981	13 June 1987	Conservative	Thatcher II
John Moore	13 June 1987	24 July 1988	Conservative	Thatcher III

Post split into the Secretary of State for Social Security and the Secretary of State for Health in 1988.

=== Secretary of State for Social Security (1988–2001) ===
Secretary of State	Term of office		Political party	Cabinet
John Moore	25 July 1988	22 July 1989	Conservative	Thatcher III
Tony Newton	23 July 1989	9 April 1992	Conservative	Thatcher III
Tony Newton	23 July 1989	9 April 1992	Conservative	Major I
Peter Lilley	10 April 1992	2 May 1997	Conservative	Major II
Harriet Harman	3 May 1997	27 July 1998	Labour	Blair I
Alistair Darling	27 July 1998	8 June 2001	Labour	Blair I

=== Secretary of State for Work and Pensions (2001–present) ===
Secretary of State	Term of office		Political party	Cabinet
Alistair Darling	8 June 2001	29 May 2002	Labour	Blair II
Andrew Smith	29 May 2002	8 September 2004	Labour	Blair II
Alan Johnson	8 September 2004	6 May 2005	Labour	Blair II
David Blunkett	6 May 2005	2 November 2005	Labour	Blair III
John Hutton	2 November 2005	28 June 2007	Labour	Blair III
Peter Hain	28 June 2007	24 January 2008	Labour	Brown
James Purnell; MP for Stalybridge and Hyde	24 January 2008	5 June 2009	Labour	Brown
Yvette Cooper; MP for Normanton, Pontefract and Castleford	6 June 2009	11 May 2010	Labour	Brown
Iain Duncan Smith; MP for Chingford and Woodford Green (Tenure)	12 May 2010	18 March 2016	Conservative	Cameron-Clegg
Iain Duncan Smith; MP for Chingford and Woodford Green (Tenure)	12 May 2010	18 March 2016	Conservative	Cameron II
Stephen Crabb; MP for Preseli Pembrokeshire	19 March 2016	14 July 2016	Conservative	Cameron II
Damian Green; MP for Ashford	14 July 2016	11 June 2017	Conservative	May I
David Gauke; MP for South West Hertfordshire	11 June 2017	8 January 2018	Conservative	May II
Esther McVey; MP for Tatton	8 January 2018	15 November 2018	Conservative	May II
Amber Rudd; MP for Hastings and Rye	16 November 2018	7 September 2019	Conservative	May II
Amber Rudd; MP for Hastings and Rye	16 November 2018	7 September 2019	Conservative	Johnson I
Thérèse Coffey; MP for Coastal Suffolk	8 September 2019	6 September 2022	Conservative	Johnson I
Thérèse Coffey; MP for Coastal Suffolk	8 September 2019	6 September 2022	Conservative	Johnson II
Chloe Smith; MP for Norwich North	6 September 2022	25 October 2022	Conservative	Truss
Mel Stride; MP for Central Devon	25 October 2022	5 July 2024	Conservative	Sunak
Liz Kendall; MP for Leicester West	5 July 2024	5 September 2025	Labour	Starmer
Pat McFadden; MP for Wolverhampton South East	5 September 2025	Incumbent	Labour	Starmer
Pat McFadden; MP for Wolverhampton South East	5 September 2025	Incumbent	Labour	Burnham

* Incumbent's length of term last updated: 5 November 2026.

== See also ==
- Secretary of State for Employment
- Parliamentary Under-Secretary of State for Pensions and Financial Inclusion
