= Labour government, 1964–1970 =

Government of the United Kingdom from 1964 to 1970

Wilson ministries
- Cabinet of the United Kingdom
- 1964–1966; 1966–1970
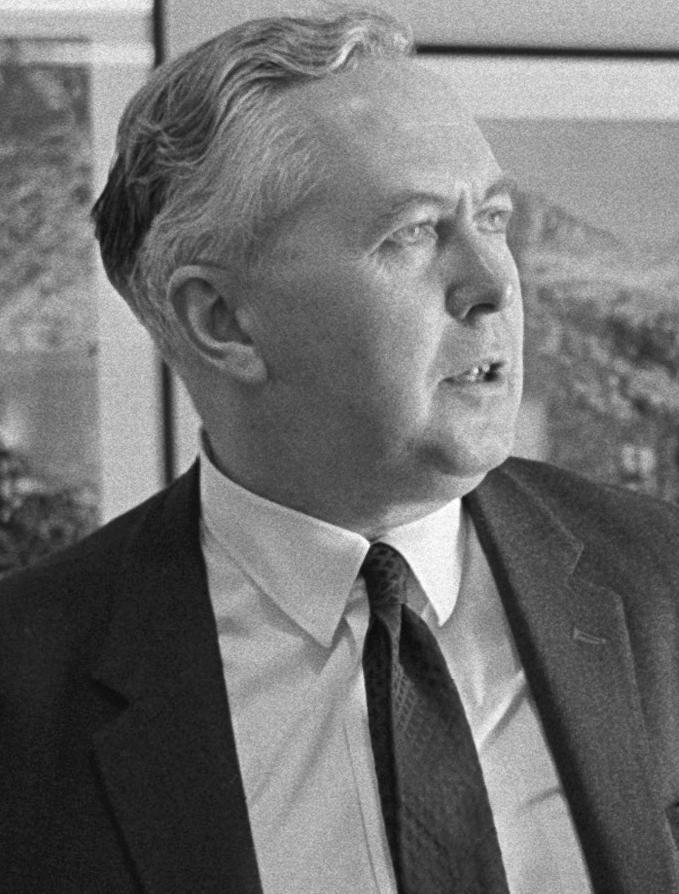
- Wilson in 1964
- Date formed: First: 16 October 1964; Second: 31 March 1966
- Date dissolved: First: 31 March 1966; Second: 19 June 1970

People and organisations
- Monarch: Elizabeth II
- Prime Minister: Harold Wilson
- Prime Minister's history: 1964–1970
- First Secretary: George Brown (1964–1966); Michael Stewart (1966–1968); Barbara Castle (1968–1970)
- Total no. of members: 339 appointments
- Member party: Labour Party
- Status in legislature: Majority
- Opposition cabinet: Home Shadow Cabinet; Heath Shadow Cabinet
- Opposition party: Conservative Party
- Opposition leader: Alec Douglas-Home (1964–1965); Edward Heath (1965–1970)

History
- Elections: 1964 general election; 1966 general election
- Outgoing election: 1970 general election
- Legislature terms: 43rd UK Parliament; 44th UK Parliament
- Predecessor: Douglas-Home ministry
- Successor: Heath ministry

Harold Wilson was appointed Prime Minister of the United Kingdom by Queen Elizabeth II on 16 October 1964 and formed the first Wilson ministry, a Labour government, which held office with a slim majority between 1964 and 1966. In an attempt to gain a workable majority in the House of Commons, Wilson called a new election for 31 March 1966, after which he formed the second Wilson ministry, a government which held office for four years until 1970.

== History ==
=== Formation ===
The Labour Party won the 1964 general election by a majority of four seats. The Profumo affair had seriously damaged the previous Conservative government, meaning Alec Douglas-Home's premiership lasted only 363 days. Wilson's tiny majority led to impotency during this Parliament, and in 1966 another election was called, leading to a majority of 96 and the continuation of the Wilson government.

=== Domestic issues ===
==== Social issues ====
A number of liberalising social reforms were passed through parliament during Wilson's first period in government. These included the near abolition of capital punishment, decriminalisation of sex between men in private, liberalisation of abortion law and the abolition of theatre censorship. The Divorce Reform Act 1969 was passed by Parliament (and came into effect in 1971). Such reforms were mostly via private member's bills on 'free votes' in line with established convention, but the large Labour majority after 1966 was undoubtedly more open to such changes than previous parliaments had been.

Wilson came culturally from a provincial non-conformist background, and he showed no particular enthusiasm for much of this agenda (which some linked to the "permissive society"), (Note: Wilson's 790-page "The Labour Government 1964–70: a Personal Record" contains no index entry for abortion, or for David Steel who sponsored abortion law reform, no index entry for homosexuality or for Leo Abse who sponsored reform in this area, no entry for divorce, or for censorship. The exception to this pattern is the abolition of capital punishment, which Wilson had consistently supported, and which is discussed at some length in his book.) but the reforming climate was especially encouraged by Roy Jenkins during his period at the Home Office. The franchise was also extended with the reduction of the voting age from twenty-one to eighteen in 1969.

Wilson's 1966–70 term witnessed growing public concern over the level of immigration to the United Kingdom. The issue was dramatised at the political level by the famous "Rivers of Blood speech" by the Conservative politician Enoch Powell, warning against the dangers of immigration, which led to Powell's dismissal from the Shadow cabinet. Wilson's government adopted a two-track approach. While condemning racial discrimination (and adopting legislation to make it an offence), Wilson's Home Secretary James Callaghan introduced significant new restrictions on the right of immigration to the United Kingdom.

==== Education ====
Education held special significance for a Labourite of Wilson's generation, in view of its role in both opening up opportunities for those from working-class backgrounds and enabling Britain to seize the potential benefits of scientific advances. Under the first Wilson government, for the first time in British history, more money was allocated to education than to defence. Wilson continued the rapid creation of new universities, in line with the recommendations of the Robbins Report, a bipartisan policy already in train when Labour took power. The economic difficulties of the period deprived the tertiary system of the resources it needed. Nevertheless, university expansion remained a core policy. One notable effect was the first entry of women into university education in significant numbers. More broadly, higher education overall was significantly expanded, with a distinct bias towards the non-university sector. During Wilson's time in office from 1964 to 1970, some 30 polytechnics were set up to provide vocationally-oriented courses that were not fully provided by universities. In addition, student participation rates were increased from 5% to 10%. Within a year of taking office, the government awarded teachers a 13% pay increase, and also tripled spending on a large publicity campaign to persuade married teachers to return to the schools. Expenditure on school buildings was also increased, together with the number of teachers in training.

Wilson also deserves credit for grasping the concept of an Open University, to give adults who had missed out on higher education a second chance through part-time study and distance learning. His political commitment included assigning implementation responsibility to Jennie Lee, the widow of Aneurin Bevan, the charismatic leader of Labour's left wing whom Wilson had joined in resigning from the Attlee cabinet. The Open University worked through summer schools, postal tuition and television programmes. By 1981, 45,000 students had received degrees through the Open University. Money was also channelled into local-authority run colleges of education.

Campaigns were also launched by the government to encourage people to take up means-tested benefits to which they were entitled to. For instance, a publicity campaign launched by the government increased the fraction of children eligible to get free school meals. Early in 1968, the standard charge for welfare milk was increased to 6d but, in addition to remission for low income, the new charge was waived automatically "for children in excess of two in any family with three or more children under five years old." At the end of 1968, about 200,000 young children in England and Wales were receiving milk automatically free under this arrangement." In addition, the number of children receiving free school meals rose from 300,000 to 600,000 by 1970, while the provision of adult education was expanded.

Wilson's record on secondary education is given a fuller description is in the article Education in England. Two factors played a role. Following the Education Act 1944 there was disaffection with the tripartite system of academically oriented Grammar schools for a small proportion of "gifted" children, and Technical and Secondary Modern schools for the majority of children. Pressure grew for the abolition of the selective principle underlying the 11-plus, and replacement with Comprehensive schools which would serve the full range of children (see the article Debates on the grammar school). Comprehensive education became Labour Party policy. From 1966 to 1970, the proportion of children in comprehensive schools increased from about 10% to over 30%. There was also a move in primary schools towards "child-centred" or individual learning, in keeping with the recommendations of the 1967 Plowden Report on improving the education system. Polytechnics were established in 1965 through the amalgamation of existing institutions such as colleges of technology, art, and commerce. A new external examination, designed for children of middling intellectual ability and leading to a Certificate of Secondary Education (CSE), was also introduced that same year. Advanced level courses in further education were also expanded by the government much faster than under the previous Conservative government. The Training of Teachers Regulations 1967 related to England and Wales provided for the payment of grants to students undergoing training as teachers. The School Premises (General Requirements and Standards) (Scotland) Regulations 1967 set out minimum standards for educational accommodation, playing fields and school sites, and also prescribed standards for " kitchen premises, toilet and washing facilities and staff accommodation." In addition, the Education (School Milk) Act of March 1970 "extended the provision of free school milk to junior pupils in middle schools", who had been deprived of their school milk by Section 3(1) of the Public Expenditure and Receipts Act 1968.

Labour pressed local authorities to convert grammar schools into comprehensives. Conversion continued on a large scale during the subsequent Conservative Heath ministry, although the Secretary of State, Margaret Thatcher, ended the compulsion of local governments to convert.

Wilson's first government reluctantly decided that it could not fulfill its long-held promise to raise the school leaving age to 16, because of the investment required in infrastructure, such as tens of thousands of extra classrooms and teachers. Baroness Lee considered resigning in protest, but narrowly decided against this in the interests of party unity. It was left to Thatcher to raise the age, during the Heath government.

Attempts were also made to improve the provision of nursery education. In 1960, as a means of saving money, the Conservative government issued a circular which forbade the expansion of nursery education. This restriction was slightly relaxed just before the July 1964 election, when authorities were allowed to provide places "where this would enable married women to return to teaching." In 1965, the Labour government provided a further relaxation which allowed authorities to expand "so long as they provided some extra places for teachers to whom priority was to be given." Nevertheless, the number of children under five in maintained nursery, primary, and special schools increased only slightly, from 222,000 in 1965 to 239,000 in 1969. The Education (Scotland) Act 1969 "removed the power of local authorities to charge fees," and also made child guidance services mandatory.

In 1965, the power was given to the National Assistance Board to make allowances for student mothers and (as noted by one study) "occasionally, fathers in cases where the local authority refused to do so." In 1967, Wilson's government decided to spend £16 million, mainly in "Educational Priority Areas", over the next two years. Over a two-year period, £16 million was allocated by the government for construction of schools in EPAs, while teachers in 572 primary schools "of exceptional difficulty" were selected for additional increments. After negotiations with teachers' unions, £400,000 of this money was set aide to pay teachers an additional £75 per annum for working in "schools of exceptional difficulty", of which 570 schools were designated. In April 1966, the government authorised school building projects in 57 authorities in England and Wales. It also sponsored an action research project, an experiment in five of the EPAs to try to devise the most effective ways of involving communities, according to Brian Lapping,

"in the work of their schools, compensating the children for the deprivation of their background, seeing whether, in one area pre-school play groups, in another intensive language tuition, in another emphasis on home-school relations, would be most effective."

Overall, public expenditure on education rose as a proportion of GNP from 4.8% in 1964 to 5.9% in 1968, and the number of teachers in training increased by more than a third between 1964 and 1967. The percentage of students staying on at school after the age of sixteen increased similarly, and the student population increased by over 10% each year. Pupil-teacher ratios were also steadily reduced. As a result of the first Wilson government's educational policies, opportunities for working-class children were improved, while overall access to education in 1970 was broader than in 1964. As summarised by Brian Lapping:

The years 1964–70 were largely taken up with creating extra places in universities, polytechnics, technical colleges, colleges of education: preparing for the day when a new Act would make it the right of a student, on leaving school, to have a place in an institution of further education.

==== Housing ====
Housing was a major policy area under the first Wilson government. During Wilson's time in office from 1964 to 1970, more new houses were built than in the last six years of the previous Conservative government. Within a year of the First Wilson Government assuming office, the amount of money available to local authorities at special favourable rates of interest was doubled from £50,000 to £100,000. The proportion of council housing rose from 42% to 50% of the total, while the number of council homes built increased steadily, from 119,000 in 1964 to 133,000 in 1965 and to 142,000 in 1966, with hundreds of blocks of multi-storey flats (mostly built in the cities and larger towns) being among these. A number of new towns were created during the 1960s for inner city overspill, namely Telford in Shropshire (which was mostly populated by former residents of Birmingham and Wolverhampton) and Milton Keynes in Buckinghamshire (for the London overspill population). Several existing towns began to expand to accommodate inner city overspill, a notable example being families from Liverpool and Manchester relocating to the expanded town of Warrington, which was situated halfway between the two cities. Many families from Birmingham also moved several miles to the south of the city to the expanding Worcestershire town of Redditch.

Allowing for demolitions, 1.3 million new homes were built between 1965 and 1970, To encourage home ownership, the government introduced the Option Mortgage Scheme (1968), which made low-income housebuyers eligible for subsidies (equivalent to tax relief on mortgage interest payments). This scheme had the effect of reducing housing costs for buyers on low incomes and enabling more people to become owner occupiers. In addition, house owners were exempted from capital gains tax. Together with the Option Mortgage Scheme, this measure stimulated the private housing market. To improve conditions for homeless people, a joint circular of the Ministry of Health, Home Office, and Ministry of Local Government of 1966 recommended that families "ought not to be split at reception centres, and that more family privacy was desirable." According to one study, the "great majority" of local authorities incorporated these suggestions into their policies."

The government also accepted most of the recommendations of the 1961 Parker Morris Report for significantly improved standards of space and amenities new local authority dwellings. The first Wilson government made Parker Morris recommendations mandatory for public sector housing in new towns in 1967 and for local authorities in 1969. By 1967, almost 85% of council dwellings were being built to the standards laid out by the 1961 Parker Morris Report, and from January 1969 Parker Morris space and heating standards became mandatory. in public housing design. In 1965, a national framework of uniform building regulations was introduced.

Significant emphasis was also placed on town planning, with new conservation areas introduced and a new generation of new towns built, notably Milton Keynes. The New Towns Acts of 1965 and 1968 together gave the government the authority (through its ministries) to designate any area of land as a site for a New Town. The government also combined its push for the construction of more new housing with encouragement and subsidisation of the renovation of old houses (as an alternative to their destruction and replacement). The Housing Improvement Act 1969, for example, made it easier to turn old houses into new homes by encouraging rehabilitation and modernisation through increased grants to property owners. The Act sought to place the economics of housing improvement in a much better relationship to those of redevelopment. Under the Act, local authorities were provided with powers to designate "improvement areas" and to pursue a policy of area-wide improvement. An area could be declared an improvement area if 50% or more of the dwellings within its bounds lacked at least one of the following standard amenities, which included hot and cold running water, an inside toilet, a sink, a wash basin, and a fixed bath or shower. Local authorities in the area could encourage householders in the area to improve their dwellings with the aid of grants. The legislation also introduced major financial changes, including an increase in the normal total standard grant from £155 to £200, an increase from £400 to £1000 in the maximum improvement grant that might be given at the discretion of the local authority, and a new Exchequer grant to local authorities of 50% of the expense for environmental improvement on costs of up to £100 per dwelling in newly designated improvement areas. The legislation introduced special grants for installing amenities in houses in multi-occupation and government grants towards environmental improvement up to an expenditure of £100 per dwelling, while approved works of repair and replacement became eligible for grant aid for the first time ever. Altogether, between 1965 and 1970, over 2 million homes had been constructed (almost half of which were council properties), more than in any other five-year period since 1918.

The Protection from Eviction Act 1964 outlawed the eviction of tenants without a court order, and according to Colin Crouch and Martin Wolf, did much "to stem the rising tide of homelessness," especially in London. The Rent Act 1965 extended security of tenure, introduced registration of rents, and protection from eviction for private tenants, making illegal the harassment of tenants. This legislation was attributed to fall in number of homeless families taken into welfare accommodation each year in the London County Council area, from 2,000 in 1962–64 to 1,300 in 1965 and 1,500 in 1966. The Leasehold Reform Act 1967 was passed in order to enable holders of long leases to purchase the freehold of their homes. This legislation provided about one million leaseholders with the right to purchase the freehold of their homes. It also provided for compensation to be paid in particular cases. Controls were introduced over increases in the rents of council accommodation, a new Rent Act 1965 froze the rent for most unfurnished accommodation in the private sector while providing tenants with greater security of tenure and protection against harassment, and a system was introduced whereby independent arbitrators had the power to fix fair rents. In addition, the First Wilson government encouraged the introduction of discretionary local authority rent rebates to assist with housing costs, and also initiated the possibility of paying rates by instalments. In November 1969, legislation was passed by the government limiting rent rises following anti-eviction protests.

According to one study, the 1964 Housing Act, which was passed by in the incoming Labour government, "strengthened local authorities' powers to enforce minimum standards on privately owned housing and encouraged housing societies to build for low rent and for co-ownership by establishing a Housing Corporation which had powers to borrow from the Exchequer (£50 million in the first instance) for this purpose." Generous new subsidies were also introduced by the government to encourage authorities to construct many more houses and to build them to Parker Morris standards. In 1967, the government issued a circular which urged authorities to adopt and publicise rent rebate schemes. As a result of this circular, the number of authorities adopting such schemes rose from 40% before the circular to 53% by March 1968. About 70% of tenants were covered, though not necessarily in receipt of rebates:

"... 495 authorities operated rent rebate schemes, and the £9.5 million total rebate went to over a quarter of a million tenants, representing nearly 12 per cent of the total housing stock. The average rebate, 13s 9d, amounted to one third of the average rent."

Legislation was introduced which regulated tenancies for properties with a rateable value of up to £200 per year (£400 in London), which meant that tenants were not only to be protected from intimidation, but that evictions would now require court orders. It also restructured the housing subsidy system such that the borrowing charges of local authorities of individual local authorities would be pegged to 4% interest. The Rating Act 1966 introduced the rating of empty properties and provided for the payment of rates in instalments. The Local Government Act 1966 introduced a "domestic" element in the new Rate Support Grant, by providing relief to domestic ratepayers on a rising scale, so that as local expenditure rose, government grant was geared to outpace it. As noted by one historian,

"The amount of grant in the domestic element would be calculated as sufficient to subsidise domestic ratepayers to the extent of a fivepenny rate in the first year, tenpence in the second, and so on."

The Housing (Slum Clearance Compensation) Act 1965 continued a provision for home owners of unfit dwellings purchased between 1939 and 1955 to be compensated at market values. The Building Control Act 1966 introduced building licensing to give priority to housing construction. Under the Supplementary Benefit Act 1966, an owner occupier on benefits was entitled to an allowance for repairs, insurance, rates, and "reasonable" interest charges on a mortgage. A Land Commission was also established to purchase land for building and therefore prevent profiteering in land values, although it only had limited success. The aim of the Land Commission was to purchase land for public goods such as housing or shopping redevelopment (compulsorily, if the need arose), and investigated the planning needs of a particular area in conjunction with the Ministry of Housing and some planning authorities to see if any land in any particular area would be needed for such developmental schemes. Although the Land Commission purchased substantial quantities of land, it did not become the dominant influence in the land market that the government had hoped for.

The Housing Subsidies Act 1967 fixed interest rates at 4% for councils borrowing to build homes. It also provided financial assistance to local authorities for conversions and improvements, while also reforming the standard of fitness for human habitation. The 1967 Act increased subsidies on new houses to such an extent that it became the largest individual source of subsidy after a previous Housing Subsidy Act 1946. For a period, as part of the prices and incomes standstill introduced by the government, local authorities were not permitted to raise rents. Thereafter, a limit was set on the extent of increases that were permitted. In 1969, a form of mortgage interest tax relief entitled MIRAS was established to help stimulate home ownership.

The Town and Country Planning Act 1968 provided more local autonomy in town planning. This piece of legislation aimed for greater flexibility and speed in the planning of land use, and made public participation a statutory requirement in the preparation of development plans. The Act also introduced a new system of process planning under which the spatial distribution of social and economic trends superseded physical standards as the principal concern of planners. According to Maureen Rhoden, this effectively meant that the development control system operated by local authorities 'policed' new housing demand. This allowed for new development on infill sites or on the edge of larger towns and villages, "but preventing development in the open countryside and in designated areas such as green belts and Areas of Outstanding Natural Beauty." In addition, opportunities for public participation in the planning process were also increased by the Act, partly in response to opposition to some features of urban housing and planning policies. General improvement areas covering 23,254 dwellings had been declared by September 1970, with work having been completed on 683 dwellings. In addition, the Labour government went further than previous administrations in aiming to safeguard the housing programme from wider economic problems.

==== Social Services and welfare ====
Increased funds were allocated to social services during the first Wilson government's time in office. Between 1953 and 1958 spending on housing increased by 9.6%, social security by 6.6%, health by 6%, and education by 6.9%, while from 1964 to 1967 social spending increased by 45%. In terms of the social wage, by 1968, spending on health had gone up by 47%, education by 47%, public sector housing by 63%, and the social security budget by 58%. During the six years of the first Wilson government, spending on social services rose much faster than real personal incomes, and from 1964 to 1969, spending on social services rose from 14.6% to 17.6% of GNP, an increase of nearly 20%. In the years from 1964/65 to 1967/68, real public expenditure rose by 3.8%, 5.9%, 5.7%, and 13.1%, respectively. In the years 1963-64 to 1967-68 the percentage increase in real public spending on housing was 42%, in education 26%, in childcare 21%, in social security 29%, and in health and welfare 23%. Altogether, from 1964 to 1970, spending on social services rose from 16% to 23% of national wealth between 1964 and 1970. As noted by the historian Richard Whiting, spending on social services under Wilson rose faster than the growth in GNP, by 65% (excluding housing) as against 37% for GNP, "a substantially better record than that achieved by the preceding Conservative governments."

In terms of social security, the welfare state was significantly expanded through substantial increases in national insurance benefits (which rose in real terms by 20% from 1964 to 1970) and the creation of new social welfare benefits. A variety of measures was introduced under Wilson which improved the living standards of many people with low incomes.

Short-term unemployment benefits were increased, while the National Assistance Board was merged with the Ministry of Pensions and National Insurance to become the new Department of Social Security, which replaced national assistance with supplementary benefit, improved benefit scale rates, and provided a statutory right to benefit for the out-of-work needy. Since 1966, as noted by one study, "the concept of right to benefit has tended to spill over from the clear entitlement to allowances to at the scale rate to these discretionary additions and exceptional needs grants – even though a 'right' dependent on the exercise of discretion can never be of the same order as one arising out of a determination of need by the application of a standard formula." As noted by the same study, examples of such discretionary awards "are for special diets in the case of certain illnesses; for extra fuel in the case of the old or the housebound or of damp housing; for laundry costs for the incontinent or for extra clothing needed because of heavy wear and tear arising from a disability; domestic help for people who cannot do their own housework; fares to visit a relative in hospital, and so on." According to another study, "In general, MSS supplementary benefits are on a slightly more generous scale than the previous National Assistance Board allowances, and the rules and conditions for getting them are simpler."

Although people were kept above a new unofficial poverty line, however, many thousands lived only just above it.

The government also succeeded in persuading people to draw assistance to which they were entitled to but had not claimed before. The number of elderly Britons receiving home helps rose by over 15% from 1964 to 1969, while nearly three times as many meals on wheels were served in 1968 as in 1964. The Ministry of Health and the Ministry of Social Security were amalgamated in 1968 into the Department of Health and Social Security, the purpose of which was to coordinate benefits in cash with benefits in kind since "the services needed to deal with social insecurity are not cash benefits only, but health and welfare as well." The Social Work (Scotland) Act of 1968 placed a duty on Scottish local authorities "to make direct payments available to certain disabled adults and children who wish to receive them." Funds were also earmarked to be spent specifically on mental handicap hospitals. These earmarked funds "were later extended to other long-stay services, although earmarking came to an end in 1974." In addition, the National Insurance Act 1969 contained a provision to extend death benefit insurance cover "to make it payable, on the insurance of close relatives, in respect of the deaths of handicapped people who had never themselves been able to work and contribute to insurance."

The new Supplementary Benefit scheme included a fixed basic weekly rate that those with an income below this level would now have a right to claim, while extra payments were made available on a discretionary basis for additional needs. To the basic requirements an allowance was added for rent. The scheme also allowed for payment of benefits in kind, together with an extra allowance for expenses that were connected with sub-letting; with a higher allowance where the accommodation was furnished and heat and light were provided, and a lower allowance for unserviced and unfurnished accommodation. As noted by one study, in assessing the changes brought about by the supplementary benefit scheme:

The innovations were in the express provision of a specific entitlement to supplementary benefits; the introduction of a long-term addition for certain groups which has since 1973 been included in the basic scale rate for all but the unemployed, and the simplification of procedures for claiming benefits.

In 1966, the period for which flat rate unemployment benefit was payable was extended to twelve months, while the earnings limit for pensioners was extended. A long term addition of 9 shillings (which was subsequently increased to 10 shillings) a week was provided for the allowances of all pensioners and for the long term sick, while the real value of most existing benefits was increased, (such as family allowances, which were substantially raised in 1967 and 1968) with benefits rising at roughly the same rate as salaries over the course of the first Wilson government, while family allowances were significantly increased. By 1969, family allowances were worth 72% more in real terms to a low income family with three children than in 1964. The single pension was raised by 12s 6d in March 1965, by 10s in 1967 and by a further 10s in 1969. From April 1964 to April 1970, family allowances for four children increased as a percentage of male manual workers aged 21 and above from 8% to 11.3%. A "clawback" mechanism was also devised under which family allowances were raised, which would (as noted by one study) "be recouped from better-off households" by a reduction in child tax allowances. In addition, the First Wilson Government kept the old age pension rising roughly as fast as average earnings during its time in office. The government, according to one study, "through a series of ad hoc annual upratings, generally maintained the value of benefits in relation to earnings."

Like the National Assistance Scheme it replaced (which provided two types of payments), two types of payments were made under the Supplementary Benefits Scheme. These were Exceptional Needs Payments and Exceptional Circumstances Additions. Exceptional Needs Payments were lump sum payments that were awarded to meet the cost of particular items like removal expenses, household equipment, furniture, bedding, clothing and footwear, household decorations and repairs, and so on. Exceptional Circumstances Additions consisted of weekly additions to the scale rates, paid in 'exceptional circumstances' and covered such expenses as laundry bills, heating costs and the cost of special diets. In addition, Section 13 of the Ministry of Social Security Act of 1966 provided the overriding power to pay benefit in an 'urgent case.' Under the Ministry of Social Security Act of 1966 a "meals out" addition could also be paid to boarders, with different amounts for breakfast and for lunch and supper. According to one study, "Under the Supplementary Benefits (SB) scheme board and lodging charges had always been met where a claimant's accommodation and meals, etc., were provided on a commercial basis. For example, the SB Act 1966 had provided for an 'appropriate' amount to be paid to a boarder." Supplementary Benefit also incorporated a more generous rate of benefit from 1966 for those out of work long-term, including the sick and disabled. The standards were also improved, beyond the long-term benefits, by removing the rigid limit on the amount of savings the person could have before receiving benefit, while the scheme "brought up to date and simplified the rules about income and savings which could be (to use the statutory term) disregarded." The Ministry of Social Security Act provided for disregards of certain payments and resources. The Supplementary Benefits Commission was also empowered "to pay either or all of extra weekly additions for people with ongoing needs (such as for supplementary heating or dietary requirements), one-off payments (ENPs) for unusual one-off needs, and payments to people 'in "urgent need"' (for example as a result of fires and flood), a power which overrode all others and could be used regardless of whether applicants were eligible for weekly benefit." As noted by one study, there was an important distinction between supplementary pensions and supplementary allowances, both of which were provided for under the supplementary benefits scheme: "Under paragraph 4 of Schedule 2 to the Act where there are 'exceptional circumstances' the Commission may increase but may not reduce the amount of a supplementary pension calculated under the Act, whereas in such circumstances a supplementary allowance may be increased, reduced or withheld. Since the supplementary pension calculated in accordance with the provisions of the Act cannot be reduced, it provides a form of guaranteed income for the pensioner." In 1968 a previous Supplementary Benefits age band was first split into a higher and a lower band following a recommendation of the Supplementary Benefits Commission, by giving a proportionately higher increase to the older group; the argument for this being that there was a greater need for an increase for the higher age range due to the expenses involved in bringing up adolescent children and the earlier onset of puberty. From April 1966 "people needing special provision for extra fuel in winter have had additions spread over the whole year" at half the winter rate. For war pensioners, in 1966 pensioners with amputations above the knee to mid-thigh had their assessment increased from 60 to 70%. This meant in money terms an increase of at least 13s. 6d. a week for these pensioners. Improvements in a number of other assessments were also made. The National Insurance (Unemployment and Sickness Benefit) Amendment Regulations 1966 provided that where a person's employment has been terminated, payments from the employer (other than wages in lieu of notice) do not affect entitlement to unemployment benefit. These regulations ended "the restrictions on the payment of benefit where discharged employees received holiday pay and certain other resettlement or compensation payments."

Two standard rates of dietary addition were introduced in 1966 when the supplementary benefits scheme was established. This included "a higher one for certain specific conditions such as diabetes and ulcerative colitis and a lower one where a diet involving extra or more expensive foods is recommended by a doctor (eg because the person is convalescing after a major illness or operation or suffers poor health because of chronic illness such as bronchitis)." Also, when the Supplementary Benefits scheme was introduced in 1966 "central heating additions (CTAs) were paid, based on claimants' actual heating costs. There was also provision that where claimants came from a number of similar dwellings a common figure could be established and applied in each of their cases." The Commission was also empowered by Schedule 2 of the Act to determine the requirements of persons in hospital or local authority homes. In the case of a single patient the requirements were 16s for personal expenses plus provision for necessary commitments like rent. The requirements for persons in local authority homes were, as under National Assistance, fixed at the total of the amounts prescribed by the Minister of Health and the Secretary of State for Scotland as the minimum payment for the accommodation and amount allowed for pocket-money. Additionally, the Supplementary Benefits Commission could make payments towards funerals for supplementary benefit recipients who had accepted responsibility for funerals.

Section 6 of the Selective Employment Payments Act of 1966 placed on the Commission the duty of determining claims for repayment of Selective Employment Tax paid in respect of domestic or nursing help employed in a private household. The Prices and Incomes Board of 1966 provided that the Secretary of State shall "pay to any members of the Board such remuneration, and such travelling or 70 other allowances, as he may with the approval of the Treasury determine, as well as pay "such pension, allowance or gratuity, as he may, with the like approval, determine." The return for deferred retirement was improved and from 1967 the next of kin of a service man buried overseas "has been permitted either a visit to attend the funeral, or if this is not possible a subsequent visit within the next two years to see the grave, at public expense, together with a companion." Also, as noted by one study, "At the same time the provisions for war widows who were separated from their husbands at the time of death were improved. Pensions to such widows, previously permanently restricted to the amount of financial support received from the husband, can now be increased in proportion to any increases in the standard rate of war widow's pension after the husband's death." A 1967 amended Order provided for a removal on a restriction on the amount of rent allowance payable to a separated widow.

From 1966 to 1968, various reforms were carried out by the government to improve social security benefits, and which improved the real standards of insurance and assistance provision for low earners. The purchasing power of family allowances were improved, which as a percentage of the gross earnings of an average manual worker with five children rising from 9.5% to 17.% between 1966 and 1968, while improvements were made in additional payments for children via social insurance, with adults receiving a more modest improvement in flat rate payments. In addition, the real level of income guaranteed through assistance was enhanced, with rates increased in the autumn of 1966, 1967, and 1968. Taking into account averages for manual workers, and comparing the last quarter of 1968 with the first quarter of 1966, basic minimum benefits went up in real terms during that period by 4% for a family with 2 children, 18% for a family with 3 children, and 47% for a family with 5 children, while the total benefit went up by 50% for a family with 2 children, by 45% for a family with 3 children, and by 36% for a family with 5 children. According to one study, the doubling of family allowances (in money terms) at the end of 1968 "was sufficient to remove from initial poverty more than half the families (working and non-working) found to be poor at the end of 1966 by the poverty standard then applied." According to one study, the number of working families living below the Supplementary Benefit level fell from 125,000 in 1966 to 63,000 in 1970.

Under the Social Security Act 1966, newly unemployed individuals were no longer denied assistance during their first month of unemployment, while men who had had their Unemployment Benefit disallowed for six weeks (on the grounds that they had been at fault for losing their job) were no longer subjected to a harsh rule applied by the National Assistance confining their payments to below "benefit rate". Instead, a policy was adopted of paying these individuals their full entitlement less 15 shillings. The Act also introduced a long-term addition of 9 shillings for all pensioners receiving supplementary benefit and for others (with the exception of those required to register for employment) receiving supplementary benefits for two years. The purpose of the long-term addition of 9s "was to cover, so far as possible, the extra requirements of long-term recipients of supplementary benefit, including extra heating needs, extra diet, extra laundry and other exceptional needs." In 1967, the earnings limits for retirement pensioners were raised, while other changes were made in the administration of the earnings rule. From autumn 1966 onwards, part of a widowed mother's pension was not counted as income when the level of income was determined. In 1966–67 the Ministry of Social Security allowed elderly persons to receive supplementary pensions from the same book as retirement pensions, which led to a marked rise in the rate of applications for supplementary pensions. In 1968 the universal family allowance was raised for the first time in a decade. This measure was considered to be redistributive to some degree,

"from richer to poorer and from mainly male taxpayers to mothers who received family allowances, a tentative move towards what Roy Jenkins called 'civilised selectivity'".

The National Insurance Act 1966, which introduced supplementary earnings-related benefits for short-term sickness and unemployment, had far-reaching distributional consequences by "guaranteeing that insurance benefits rose at the same rate as wages in the late 1960s." Trade unions were supportive of the advances made in social protection by the Wilson government, which had a considerable impact on the living standards of the lowest quintile of the population. A statement by the TUC argued that the unions' acquiescence to the government's incomes policy was justified given that "the government had deliberately refrained from attacking the social services." Earning related supplements were also payable to those drawing unemployability supplement instead of sickness benefit, and to those in training. In addition, The General Rating Act of 1966 introduced rate rebates "for those with the lowest incomes." In October 1966, the duration of the widow's allowance, and certain allowances for war widows, was extended to 26 weeks. The earnings rule was abolished for widows receiving widowed mother’s allowance or widow’s pension, In addition, the age up to which widows’ pensions could be awarded was increased from 60 to 65, in connection with the abolition of the earnings rule for widows. In April 1967, a limitation on the awarding of arrears of national insurance benefit, when a contribution record is corrected, was brought to an end.

The introduction of earnings-related unemployment and sickness benefits significantly reduced inequalities between those in work and those who were unemployed. In 1964, the net income received by the average wage earner, when on unemployment or sickness benefit, was only 45% of what he received at work, whereas by 1968 the figure had increased to 75%. The earnings-related supplement for unemployment benefits was made available to those who had earned at least £450 in the previous financial year. The supplement was paid after a twelve-day waiting period, and the rate was one-third the amount by which the average weekly earnings (up to £30) exceeded £9. The earnings-related supplement was based on the assertion that a person's commitments for mortgages, rents, and hire purchase agreements were related to their normal earnings and could not be adjusted quickly when experiencing a loss of normal income. As a result of this supplement, the total benefit of a married man with two children went up by 52%, and that of a single man by 117.% The duration was limited to 26 weeks, while the total benefit was restricted to 85% of average weekly earnings in the preceding financial year. From 1965 to 1970, including Earnings Related Supplement, unemployment or sickness benefits as a percentage of net income at average earnings rose from 27% to 53.3% for a single person, 41.2% to 65.2% for a married couple, and from 49.3% to 72.7% for a married couple with two children. According to one study, the introduction of earnings-related unemployment benefits increased the unemployment income "of a typical married man with two children from 40 percent to 60 percent of average employment income." In real terms, under the First Wilson Government retirement pensions went up by 15.3%, unemployment and sickness benefits by 15.1% and supplementary benefits by 18.9%.

Personal social services were integrated, expenditure increased and their responsibilities broadened following the enactment of the Children and Young Persons' Act 1969 and the Local Authority Social Services Act 1970. The Children and Young Persons Act 1969 reformed the juvenile court system and extended local authority duties to provide community homes for juvenile offenders. The legislation provided that "remand homes," "approved schools," and local authority and voluntary children's homes became part of a comprehensive system of community homes for all children in care. This provided that children who got into trouble with the police should more certainly and quickly than ever before receive special educational assistance, social work help or any other form of assistance (financial or otherwise) that the community could provide. Under the Health Services and Public Health Act 1968, largely as a result of their insistence, local authorities were granted powers to "promote the welfare" of elderly people in order to allow them greater flexibility in the provision of services. Health and welfare services for the elderly were improved, with about 15,000 new places provided in homes for the elderly between 1965 and 1968. From 1964 to 1966, the number of home helps rose from 28,237 to 30,244. Efforts were also made to improve provisions for mentally handicapped adults and children. From 1965 up until the end of 1966, the number of places available in adult training centres rose from 15,000 to 19,000, while for mentally handicapped children there were over 20,000 places in junior training centres by 1966, compared with less than 5,000 in 1960. In addition, spending of local authorities on the mentally ill doubled from £10 million in 1963/64 to £20 million in 1967/68. The Local Employment Act of 1970 "empowered the designation of areas for which grant assistance could be given for improvement of basic services and derelict land clearance" while the Social Needs (Grants) Act (NI) 1970 "made provision for the authorisation of the payment of grants towards expenditure incurred due to special social need in urban areas." In addition, the Public Health (Recurring Nuisances) Act 1969 provided local authorities with the power (as noted by one study) "to prevent the recurrence of an already abated nuisance if such recurrence was deemed likely."

During the Labour Government's time in office, a number of welfare reforms were designed that would eventually be implemented under successive Conservative and Labour governments throughout the Seventies. In 1967, the (then) chancellor James Callaghan called for a means-tested Family Supplement which was debated in cabinet. Callaghan’s advocacy of this income-tested allowance was based on his belief that such a measure would be cheaper and more efficient at tackling poverty than increasing family allowances. Callaghan's proposal never came into being during the government's time in office, but it was later introduced by the Heath Government under the name "Family Income Supplement." Richard Crossman, although a critic of the bill that provided for the Family Income Supplement, nevertheless described the benefit as ‘an old friend of ours.’ Callaghan was also supportive of the introduction of a means-tested housing allowance, but as in the case of the Family Income Supplement this idea did not come into fruition until the advent of the Heath Administration. In 1969, the government announced plans for introducing two new benefits for the disabled: an Attendance Allowance for the very severely disabled, and an Invalidity Pension for people forced to retire early due to illness. Neither benefit, however, came into being during the remainder of the First Wilson Government's time in office, although the proposed Attendance Allowance would later be introduced by the Heath Government and the Invalidity Pension by the Second Wilson Government. Another proposal made during the government's time in office which did not get implemented by the end of its tenure was the introduction of a two-yearly review of pensions. In 1970, the Conservatives themselves promised to introduce this, but instead went further by introducing an annual review of pensions.

In January 1969, a White Paper on National Superannuation and Social Insurance was published that provided for scaled-down pensions for widowed mothers whose allowance ended between the ages of 40 and 50, and for childless widows between the ages of 40 and 50. The Paper also provided for a scaled-down flat-rate pension for existing widows if they satisfied (as noted by one MP) "the new qualifying condition at the time that they were widowed or when widowed mother's allowance ceased." Pensions for widows between the ages of 40 and 50 were later introduced during Edward Heath's premiership. The same White Paper also provided a plan for a scheme (as noted by one observer) "designed to transform the existing predominantly flat-rate state pension regime into one based on the concept of earnings-relation." Legislation based on the White Paper was due to receive royal assent, but Labour’s loss in the 1970 general election put paid to this plan. In 1978, however, a state earnings-related pension scheme was introduced by the Callaghan Government.

The legislation that failed to pass as a result of the 1970 election (known as the National Superannuation and Social Insurance Bill) contained most of the above welfare reforms Labour planned during its time in office, such as pensions for younger widows, an Attendance Allowance, improved benefits for the sick and disabled, and a two-yearly review of pensions. As noted by one observer, "The Attendance Allowance, the provision for younger widows and the new invalidity benefit were all lifted word for word from the defunct Labour National Superannuation and Social Insurance Bill."

In 1969, Richard Crossman set up the Finer Committee on One-Parent Families to look into ways of helping such families. This was partly in response to the government's White Paper from January that year which had also proposed (as noted by one study) "the setting up of an inquiry into how best to aid one-parent families and, more generally, their position in society." Its work culminated in a report published in 1974, known as the Finer Report, which set out 230 recommendations. Although only 38 of its recommendations had been adopted by 1978, while 115 had been disregarded or rejected, the Finer Report successfully contributed (as noted by one study) "to the successful enactment of other policies which acknowledged the importance of financial support for lone parents and the need for progress in the field of lone-parent policies (Millar, 1994, 68), such as the extension of family allowances, the introduction of the Child Benefit Scheme and One Parent Benefit."

==== Urban renewal ====
Various measures were introduced to improve socio-economic conditions in deprived urban areas. Section 11 of the Local Government Act 1966 enabled local authorities to claim grants to recruit additional staff to meet special needs of Commonwealth immigrants. According to Brian Lapping, this was the first step ever taken towards directing help to areas with special needs, "the reversal of the former position under which ministers had passed the burden of social help measures in housing, education and health to local authorities without passing them any money."

The first Wilson government made assistance to deprived urban communities a specific policy of national government in 1969 with the passage of the Local Government Grants (Social Need) Act, which empowered the Home Secretary to dispense grants to assist local authorities in providing extra help to areas "of special social need". The Urban Aid Programme was subsequently launched to provide community and family advice centres, centres for the elderly, money for schools and other services, thereby alleviating urban deprivation. In introducing the Urban Aid Programme, the then Home Secretary James Callaghan stated that the goal of the legislation was to

"provide for the care of our citizens who live in the poorest overcrowded parts of our cities and towns. It is intended to arrest ... and reverse the downward spiral which afflicts so many of these areas. There is a deadly quagmire of need and poverty."

Under the Urban Aid Programme, funds were provided for centres for unattached youngsters, family advice centres, community centres, centres for the elderly, and in one case for an experimental scheme for rehabilitating methylated spirit drinkers. Central government paid 75% of the costs of these schemes, which were nominated by local authorities in areas of "acute social need". As a result of this legislation, many ideas were put into practice such as language classes for immigrants, daycentres for the elderly or disabled, day nurseries, adventure playgrounds, and holidays for deprived or handicapped children. The schemes therefore proved successful in making extra social provision while encouraging community development. In January 1969, 23 local authorities were awarded a total of £3 million mainly for nursery education but also for children's homes and day nurseries. The second phase, in July 1969, agreed to finance some 500 projects in 89 authorities to a total of £4.5 million, and while the emphasis again stressed education with teachers; centres, nursery schools and language classes for immigrants, aid was also given through the local authorities to voluntary societies to run adventure playgrounds, play centres, and play groups.

Twelve Community Development Projects (CDPs) were set up in areas with high levels of deprivation to encourage self-help and participation by local residents in order to improve their communication and access to local government, together with improving the provision of local services. In the years that followed, these action-research projects increasingly challenged existing ideas about the causes of inner-city deprivation, arguing that the roots of poverty in such areas could be traced to changes in the political economy of inner-city areas, such as the withdrawal of private capital (as characterised by the decline of manufacturing industries).

The Community Development Projects involved co-operation between specially created local teams of social workers, who were supported by part-timers (such as policemen and youth employment officers). The task given to these groups (who were watched over by their own action research teams) was to ascertain how much real demand t here was for support from the social services in their areas of choice, based on the theory that workers in social services usually failed to communicate what they had to offer or to make themselves available, thereby resulting in many deprived people failing to acquire the services that they so desperately needed.

As noted by Brian Lapping, the Community Development Projects were also designed to test the view that within poor communities local residents could articulate local grievances, get conditions in their areas improved, and provide some kind of political leadership, in a way that the existing political structure had failed to do, "largely because these areas of intense poverty were rarely big enough to be electorally important." In assessing the first Wilson government's efforts to uplift the poorest members of British society via the establishment of the Community Development Projects and the designation of the Educational Priority Areas, Lapping noted that:

"The determination expressed in the diverse policies to give this unfortunate group the help it needed was among the most humane and important initiatives of the 1964–70 government."

==== Workers ====
Various measures were introduced during the first Wilson government's time in office to improve general working conditions. Improvements were made in conditions for nursing staff following the publication of a report by the NBPI in 1968 on the pay of nurses. This led to the introduction of a far more substantial pay lead for nurses in geriatric and psychiatric hospitals, together with (for the first time) premium rates for weekend and night work. Some progress was also made increasing the pay of NHS manual workers through incentive schemes. Despite these improvements, however, the NHS retained a reputation of being a low-wage employer by the end of the first Wilson government's time in office.

Regulations were also introduced in November 1964 that extended (as noted by one study) "insurance cover for benefits under the National Insurance and Industrial Injuries Schemes to persons engaged in the exploration and exploitation of the sea bed and subsoil in an area designated under the Continental Shelf Act." The Redundancy Payment Act 1965 required employers to make lump-sum payments to employees dismissed due to redundancy, and also required these payments (as noted by one study) "to be made in certain circumstances to employees who have been laid off or kept on short-time for a substantial period." The Workmen's Compensation and Benefit (Amendment) Act of 1965 extended the scope of allowances provided under the Industrial Injuries Fund to an additional 10,000 men, while also rationalising the whole complex of allowances. Three types of allowance were provided under the Workmens' Compensation (Supplementation) Scheme of 1966, including a basic allowance, a major incapacity allowance and a lesser incapacity allowance. The basic allowance of up to £2 a week was payable "to persons injured before 1924, to put them broadly in the same financial position as if they had received compensation assessed under the post-1924 workmen's compensation rules." This allowance continued a provision made in the original 1951 Workmen's Compensation (Supplementation) Scheme. A major incapacity allowance was payable in cases of prolonged total incapacity or total disablement, while a lesser incapacity allowance was payable "to partially disabled persons entitled to a basic allowance or to weekly payments of workmen's compensation related to an existing loss of earnings."

Under the Shops (Early Closing Days) Act of 1965, shop workers were entitled to an "early closing day" once a week. The Power Press Regulations of 1965 required "a trained person to carry out tests and inspections after every tool change and during the first four hours of every shift", while the Construction (Working Places) Regulations of 1966 "stipulated statutory arrangements for safety on building sites". The National Insurance Act 1966 introduced more generous provisions for the assessment of certain types of serious disablement caused by industrial injury. That same year, a Pneumoconiosis, Byssinosis and Miscellaneous Diseases Benefit Scheme was introduced. The Pneumoconiosis, Byssinosis and Miscellaneous Diseases Benefit (Amendment) Scheme of 1966 provided for a new increase of allowance for exceptionally severely disabled persons who were covered by the Scheme. Under this scheme, allowances for total and partial disablement were provided, together with death grants. The scheme also provided for increases of allowances in respect of wives, children, unemployability, and constant attendance. During a strike by seamen in 1966, the government set up a Committee of Enquiry that helped settle the strike with terms agreed such as an immediate reduction in working hours for seamen from 56 to 48 hours and an extension of annual leave from 39 to 48 days.

The Employers' Liability (Compulsory Insurance) Act 1969 was passed, requiring employers to insure their liability to their employees for personal injury, disease or death sustained in their place of work. The Asbestos Regulations of 1969 sought to protect people in the workplace from exposure to asbestos, while the Employer's Liability (Defective Equipment) Act 1969 introduced that same year made employers liable for injuries caused to employees by defective equipment. In addition, the Agriculture Act of 1967 gave the Agricultural Wages Board the power to fix minimum rates of sick pay for farmworkers, while extra allowances "encouraged general practitioners to work in groups, and vocational training payments encouraged young doctors to undertake specific training before entering practice." The National Insurance (Industrial Injuries) (Benefit) Amendment Regulations 1967 provided for an extension of the circumstances in which "certain increases of disablement pension are payable to persons temporarily abroad."

Efforts were made to increase support for occupational health while Wilson's government also ensured that low-income earners improved their position relative to that of average-income earners during its time in office. One of the principles of the government's prices and incomes policy was that low-paid workers would be given special consideration, and between 1965 and 1969 the earnings of the lowest paid workers increased slightly faster than the average (the increase in inflation in 1969–70 caused by devaluation, however, led to a deterioration in the position of low-paid workers). The Prices and Incomes Board was successful in directing some "above the norm" pay rises to low-paid groups such as local government employees and agricultural workers. However, the large increases in pay given to manual workers in local government in September 1969 (such as street sweepers and dustmen) subsequently set off a spiral of wage demands in industry, which meant that the improvement in the relative position of the local government manual worker was not sustained.

The National Insurance (Industrial Injuries) Act (1965) established the principle of "payment of industrial injury benefit for prescribed industrial diseases or for personal injury following an accident (e.g., acute blast injury to the ear)," and also gave employees the right "to claim damages from an employer where industrial injuries are sustained." The Redundant Mineworkers Payments Scheme of 1968 was introduced to ensure that redundant mineworkers having to leave the industry at or above the age of 55 "would have their income supplemented for a period so that they could adjust themselves in their new circumstances." In 1966, extensions and improvements were made in the allowances payable out of the Industrial Injuries Fund to people who had been injured before 5 July 1948 and who were entitled to weekly payments of worker's compensation. In 1968, various steps were taken to reduce the severity with which the "wage-stop" operated, a regressive mechanism which restricted the amount of assistance payable to an unemployed person. According to one report from 1966, there were provisions in place to prevent hardship as a result of the "wage stop" and also to make sure that allowances moved in line with increases in earnings: "Although a person whose allowance is subject to "wage-stop" is no worse off financially while he is unemployed than when he is working, the Commission recognize that the family could suffer hardship. Their officers, therefore, keep a special lookout for hardship to the family where the allowance is substantially restricted, and where necessary make an additional lump-sum grant to alleviate serious hardship. Officers also keep allowances under review to make sure that they move in line with increases in the level of earnings." For miners, the Coal Industry Act 1965 introduced aid towards severance payments for miners about to be made redundant or for the vocational retraining of staff, while the Coal Industry Act 1967 provided subsidisation of redundancy and early retirement. The Coal Industry Act of 1965 provided for various grants in connection with pit closures. These covered, for instance, payments in respect of loss of superannuation and employment prospects; payments by way of contributions to superannuation funds; payments to persons in the employment of the Board whose place of employment is changed, "and who in consequence change their place of residence, in connection with the removal and resettlement of those persons with or without their dependants;" the provision of housing "for such persons as are mentioned in sub-paragraph (iv) of this paragraph;" the provision of travelling allowances or transport services for persons employed by the Board whose place of employment is changed; "the temporary supplementation of the earnings of persons employed by the Board whose work or place of employment is changed in consequence of the closure of, or of part of, a pit;" and the maintenance "of existing social welfare activities within the meaning of the [1952 c. 23.] Miners' Welfare Act 1952, or of existing arrangements for the provision of benefits in kind," in areas where the number of persons employed by the Board has fallen since the end of March 1965 as the consequence of colliery closures." Also under the Coal Industry Act of 1965 certain schemes allowed redundant men over 60 years of age to have concessionary coal. The Coal Industry Act of 1967 provided for the advance payment of pensions to redundant miners, and under the National Insurance (Industrial Injuries) (Amendment) Act 1967, men who were diagnosed as having over 50% disablement through pneumoconiosis "were allowed to have their accompanying bronchitis and emphysema treated as part of the disease," although only 3,000 men "fell into this category." In May 1969, adenocarcinoma of the nasal sinuses "in woodworkers in the furniture industry" became a prescribed occupational disease.

The New Towns Act of 1965 also provided for the payment of pensions, allowances and gratuities for members of the New Towns Commission while the Dock and Harbours Act 1966 provided for the provision of various welfare amenities for dockworkers while also providing for the granting to individuals of awards for training, research and education. In regards to local advisory committees, the Ministry of Social Security Act of 1966 provided "for the payment by the minister to the members of any such committee, and to persons attending at the request of such a committee, of such expenses and travelling and other allowances (including compensation for loss of remunerative time) as the Minister with the consent of the Treasury may determine." The Dock Workers (Regulation of Employment) (Amendment) Order 1967 contained provisions "enabling the National Board and local boards to compensate, in accordance with any joint agreement, dock workers leaving the industry, to establish and administer schemes for pensions for dock workers and to administer arrangements for payments to them during absence because of sickness or injury." The Dock Workers (Regulation of Employment) (Amendment) Order 1967 also provided for compensation for dock workers (as noted by the legislation) "whose names are removed from the register of dock workers either at their own request or otherwise."

On 16 August 1967, regulations were introduced that made changes affecting entitlement to benefits under the Industrial Injuries Act for pneumoconiosis. The persons concerned, as noted by one study, were those "whose assessments for pneumoconiosis or pneumoconiosis plus tuberculosis would, if their physical condition were otherwise normal, be assessed at 50 per cent or more. In such cases, the effects of any emphysema or chronic bronchitis is treated as the effects of pneumoconiosis." These new regulations applied to both and industrial death benefit and disablement benefit. In addition, a new scheme was introduced on 31 August 1967 that extended (as noted by one study) "the scope of the existing scheme which catered for certain persons suffering disablement resulting from employment before the Industrial Injuries scheme began in July 1948." The Carcinogenic Substances (Prohibition of Importation) Order 1967 prohibited (as noted by one study) "the importation into the United Kingdom of certain chemicals, which can give rise to cancer and of any materials containing these compounds." The Offices, Shops and Railway Premises (Hoists and Lifts) Regulations 1968 gave give hoists and lifts in railways premises, shops and offices (as noted by one study) "the same safeguards as are provided under earlier legislation for hoists and lifts in factories." In addition, the Fishing Vessels (Safety Provisions) Act 1970 and the Merchant Shipping Act 1970 sought to ensure safety at sea.

New pension provisions were also introduced for various occupational groups. Teachers acquired the right to widows' and children's benefits under the Teachers Superannuation Act 1965. From 26 August 1966 firefighters "were given the opportunity to elect to provide third rate cover for widow's benefits, i.e. a pension equal to one third of the firefighter's pension." All firefighters appointed after 25 August 1966 "automatically had widow's third rate pension cover in respect of all service." From 26 August 1966, if a firefighter died, the FPS would pay out either a flat rate pension, or a third rate pension to an eligible widow. The Police Pensions Regulations of 1966 empowered a police authority "to grant what is known as an augmented award to the widow of a police officer who lost his life as a result of an injury received in the execution of his duty in certain defined circumstances. An augmented award consists of, first, a pension which, with social security benefits, amounts to not less than one-half of the average pensionable pay of the deceased officer, and in addition a substantial lump sum." For those in the Civil Service, a 1965 Act enabled the Treasury to pay pension and lump sum benefits payable "normally at age 60, or below the age of 60 if the reason for retirement was ill-health or for service in certain countries abroad." This pension was known as a "superannuation allowance" and the lump sum was known as an "additional allowance". The calculations of these allowances were spelled out in the Act. Also, if "the Minister for the Civil Service Department certified that it would be in the interests of the efficiency of the department if she or he retired, then provided that she or he was aged at least 50, the Treasury was empowered to pay the civil servant her or his superannuation and additional allowance at the point of departure." In addition, the Act enabled the Treasury to pay special "compensation allowances" of an amount "that the Treasury decided to be reasonable and just if a civil servant's office was abolished or if the department wanted to reorganise the way its work was done. If the reason for retirement was ill-health, the efficient running of the department or reorganisation, and the civil servant had at least 20 years' service, the Treasury was empowered to enhance the superannuation and additional allowances by deeming that the civil servant had been in office for 20 years or had remained in office until age 60 if that was a shorter period. This potential enhancement was also the maximum that could be paid if the civil servant's office was abolished." The Superannuation Act 1965 provided that a widow's or children's pension may be granted where the deceased had ceased to be a civil servant in certain circumstances. Eligibility was also extended to those resident in a third country. The Overseas Service Pensions (Scheme and Fund) Regulations 1966 provided for the establishment of an Overseas Service Pension Scheme. For NHS employees, part time Specialists became pensionable in their own right, while new NHS pension entitlements were introduced including a ½ rate widow's pension was introduced for those married men who elect to forego their Lump Sum Retirement Allowance, a Child Allowance, and payment of death gratuities to widows as of right. The Superannuation (Miscellaneous Provisions) Act 1967 provided for extended superannuation entitlements for various groups. The Superannuation (Public Offices) Rules 1967 provided for "the payment of death gratuities, and for the payment of transfer values and the aggregation of public office service in cases where a person transfers with his pension rights to other employment." In addition, NHS superannuation regulations of 1965 entitled certain officers "who had elected to retain their former pension rights on entering the National Health Service to receive a pension after 10 years service at the age of 65 in the case of a man and 60 in the case of a women."

==== Liberal reforms ====
A number of measures were introduced under the First Wilson Government to make Britain a more open and humane society. The Race Relations Act 1965 outlawed direct discrimination on the grounds of race, colour, and ethnic or national origin in some public places. The legislation also set up a Race Relations Board. A centrally financed network of local officers was provided to smooth inter-racial relations by conciliation, education, and informal pressure, while a National Committee for Commonwealth Immigrants was established (under the chairmanship of the Archbishop of Canterbury) to encourage and help finance staff "for local voluntary, good-neighbour type bodies." A further Race Relations Act 1968 was passed, which made discrimination in letting or advertising housing illegal, together with discrimination in hiring and promotion. The legislation also provided a strengthened Race Relations Board with powers to "conciliate" in cases of discrimination, which meant persuading discriminators to stop such acts and, if they refused to stop, legal action could be taken against them as an ultimate sanction. The legislation also replaced the National Committee for Commonwealth Immigrants with the Community Relations Commission, a statutory body. This body was provided with an annual grant (beginning at £300,000) for social work, propaganda, and education as a means of bringing about good race relations. The Criminal Justice Act 1967 introduced suspended prison sentences and allowed a ten to two majority vote for jury decisions. An Ombudsman (Parliamentary Commissioner) was appointed in 1967 to consider complaints against government departments and to impose remedies, while censorship of plays by the Lord Chamberlain was abolished (1969). In addition, the law on Sunday Observance was relaxed, and a strengthening of legal aid was carried out.

The Criminal Evidence Act 1965 permitted documentary evidence "to be admitted at criminal trails in certain instances," while the Backing of Warrants (Ireland) Act cured an anomaly "which recent decisions of the Court had shown to exist in that field," while the British Nationality Act cured anomalies "as to the position of married women." The Justices of the Peace Act placed barristers on the same footing "as solicitors in relation to the qualifications of Justices". Clerks, and the Criminal Procedure Act implemented the recommendations of the Criminal Law Revision Committee "as to the attendance of witnesses." The Family Provision Act 1966 completely removed the restriction on awarding lump sums instead of periodical payments, and also removed a restriction "as to the child of the deceased and surviving spouse being unable to claim if the spouse had been left at least two-thirds of the income of the estate." The Criminal Justice Act, 1967, made Legal Aid available "for all persons committed by Magistrate to higher courts for trial or sentence. It was also provided that legal aid would always be granted for committal proceedings in offences triable only on indictment." That same year however, a flexible part-payments scheme with a means test that determines a defendant's fair share was introduced. Prior to 1967, all of a person's legal expenses were paid if they were granted legal aid.

The Nuclear Installations Act 1965 placed a "strict" statutory duty on the operators of nuclear facilities to ensure that any exposure to radiation resulting from operations did not cause injury or damage. Under the legislation, claimants did not have to prove fault to receive compensation under the Act, only causation. From 1966, a circular from several Whitehall ministries was sent to local authorities across the country urging them to provide permanent caravan sites for gypsies. This was followed by the Caravan Sites Act 1968, introduced by the Liberal MP Eric Lubbock in 1968, which obliged local authorities to carry out the recommendations of the 1966 circular. Under the Act, gypsies became entitled to settle in many areas as well as to enjoy regular visiting rights for their caravans in others. The Civic Amenities Act 1967 was aimed at improving and safeguarding buildings of architectural or historical interest, together with the planting and preservation of trees. A Land Commission set up in 1967 with powers to acquire land and collect a Betterment Levy (which was initially 40% of development value). The Administration of Justice Act 1970 introduced (amongst other measures) a new Family Division of the High Court. In addition, the Medicines Act of 1968 "made medicines licensing and safety an active responsibility of the state."

A number of private members' bills related to consumer affairs, put forward by Co-operative MPs, became law under the first Wilson government, and much of the consumer legislation taken for granted by contemporary British shoppers can be attributed to the legislation passed during this period. In 1968 the Trade Descriptions Act 1968 (the "shoppers' charter") was enacted by parliament, and a farm and garden chemicals bill also became law that same year. Other co-operative bills enacted during this period included a new Clean Air Act, a bill removing restrictions on off-licences, and a bill to promote agriculture co-operatives passed in 1967, which established "A scheme administered by a new Central Council for Agriculture and Horticulture Co-operation with a budget to organise and promote co-operation with agriculture and horticulture". The 1970 Chronically Sick & Disabled Persons Act, regarded as a groundbreaking measure, was the first kind of legislation in the world to recognise and give rights to disabled people, and set down specific provisions to improve access and support for people with disabilities. The government effectively supported the passage of these bills by granting them the necessary parliamentary time.

=== External affairs ===
==== United States and Vietnam ====
Wilson believed in a strong "Special Relationship" with the United States and wanted to highlight his dealings with the White House to strengthen his own prestige as a statesman. President Lyndon Johnson disliked Wilson, and ignored any "special" relationship. He agreed to provide financial help but he strongly opposed British plans to devalue the pound and withdraw military units east of Suez. Vietnam was the sore point. American military and financial aid to the beleaguered government of South Vietnam kept escalating, and American ground and air forces did most of the fighting against Communist forces. Johnson repeatedly asked for British ground units to validate international support for American intervention, but Wilson refused. He gave as reasons British military commitments to the Malayan Emergency. Instead he provided British help with intelligence, and training in jungle warfare, as well as verbal support. He also took the initiative in attempting numerous mediation schemes, typically involving Soviet intervention, none of which gained traction. Wilson's policy angered the left wing of his Labour Party. The Conservative opposition generally supported the American position on Vietnam. Issues of foreign policy were rarely salient in general elections. Wilson and Johnson also differed sharply on British economic weakness and its declining status as a world power. Historian Jonathan Colman concludes it made for the most unsatisfactory "special" relationship in the 20th century.

==== Europe ====
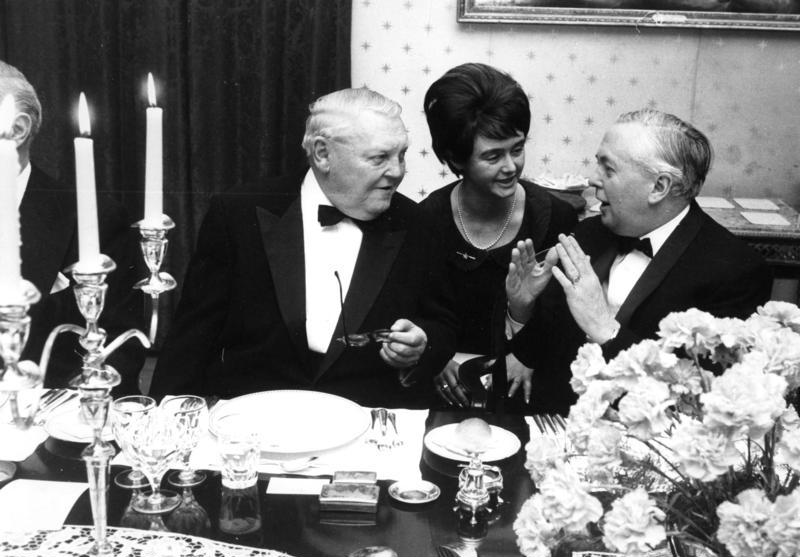
Wilson with West German Chancellor Ludwig Erhard.

Among the more challenging political dilemmas Wilson faced during his two terms in government and his two spells in opposition (before 1964, and between 1970 and 1974) was the issue of British membership of the European Communities, the forerunner of the present European Union. An entry attempt had been issued in July 1961 by the Macmillan government, and negotiated by Edward Heath as Lord Privy Seal, but was vetoed in 1963 by French President Charles de Gaulle. The Labour Party had been divided on the issue when in opposition, with former party leader Hugh Gaitskell having come out in 1962 in opposition to Britain joining the Communities.

After initially hesitating over the issue, Wilson's Government in May 1967 lodged the UK's second application to join the European Communities. Like the first, though, it was vetoed by de Gaulle in November that year.

After de Gaulle left office, Conservative prime minister Edward Heath negotiated Britain's admission to the EC in 1972. The Labour Party in opposition continued to be deeply divided on the issue, and risked a major split. Leading opponents of membership included Richard Crossman, who was for two years (1970–72) the editor of the New Statesman, at that time the leading left-of-centre weekly journal, which published many polemics in support of the anti-EEC case. Prominent among Labour supporters of membership was Roy Jenkins.

==== Asia ====
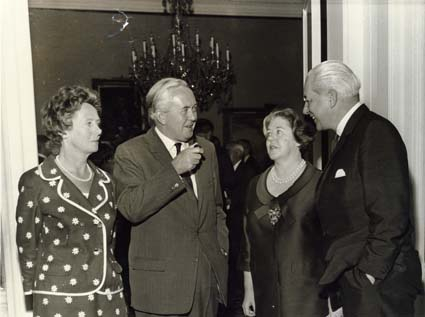
Harold and Mary Wilson (left) greeting the Prime Minister of Australia Harold Holt and his wife in 1967. The Australians strongly urged the British to maintain their military commitment in the Far East.

Since 1945 Britain's presence in the Far East had gradually been run down. Former British colonies, whose defence had provided much of the rationale for a British military presence in the region, became independent. London became increasingly conscious of the cost to the exchequer and the economy of maintaining major forces abroad (in parallel, several schemes to develop strategic weaponry were abandoned on the grounds of cost, for example, the Blue Streak missile in 1960. Instead of building its own delivery system, Britain relied on purchase of American technology, especially the Polaris submarine-based missile that was purchased in 1963.

Part of the price paid by Wilson for US financial assistance was his agreement in 1967 to maintain a military presence east of Suez. However, this was simply too expensive when domestic priorities were more pressing. In July 1967, Defence Secretary Denis Healey announced that Britain would abandon her mainland bases east of Suez by 1977. Some airmobile forces would be retained which could if necessary be deployed in the region. Wilson announced in January 1968 that the timetable for this withdrawal was to be accelerated, and that British forces were to be withdrawn from Singapore, Malaysia, and the Persian Gulf by the end of 1971.

Wilson held strong pro-Israel views. He was a particular friend of Israeli Premier Golda Meir. Another associate, although not as solid on Israel, was West German Chancellor Willy Brandt; all three were members of the Socialist International.

==== Africa ====
The British "retreat from Empire" had made headway by 1964 and was to continue during Wilson's administration. Southern Rhodesia came to present a serious problem.

A self-governing colony, Southern Rhodesia had been the economic powerhouse of the Federation of Rhodesia and Nyasaland, but unlike North Rhodesia and Nyasaland had not been granted independence, principally because of the regime in power. The country bordered South Africa to the south and its governance was influenced by the apartheid regime, then headed by Hendrik Verwoerd. Wilson refused to grant independence to the white minority government headed by Rhodesian Prime Minister Ian Smith which was not willing to extend unqualified voting rights to the native African population. His government's view was that the native population was ingenuous, and doing that would lay them open to undue influence and intimidation. The franchise was open to those who had achieved a certain (fairly low) standard of education, and to property owners, and to people of "importance", i.e. chiefs and indunas – in other words, you needed to qualify for a vote – which many natives did.

Smith's defiant response was a Unilateral Declaration of Independence, timed to coincide with Armistice Day at 11.00 am on 11 November 1965, an attempt to garner support in the UK by reminding people of the contribution of the colony to the war effort (Smith himself had been a Spitfire pilot). Smith was personally vilified in the British media. Wilson's immediate recourse was to the United Nations, and in 1965, the Security Council imposed sanctions, which were to last until the Lancaster House Agreement in 1979. This involved British warships blockading the port of Beira to try to cause economic collapse in Rhodesia. Wilson was applauded by most nations for taking a firm stand on the issue (and none extended diplomatic recognition to the Smith regime). A number of nations did not join in with sanctions, undermining their efficiency. Certain sections of public opinion started to question their efficacy, and to demand the toppling of the regime by force. Wilson declined to intervene in Rhodesia with military force, believing the British population would not support such action against their "kith and kin". The two leaders met for discussions aboard British warships, Tiger in 1966 and Fearless in 1968. Smith subsequently attacked Wilson in his memoirs, accusing him of delaying tactics during negotiations and alleging duplicity; Wilson responded in kind, questioning Smith's good faith and suggesting that Smith had moved the goal-posts whenever a settlement appeared in sight. The matter was still unresolved at the time of Wilson's resignation in 1976.

Elsewhere in Africa, trouble developed in Nigeria, brought about by the ethnic hatreds and Biafra's efforts to become independent. Wilson supported the established new governments in former colonies and refused to countenance breakaway movements. He supported the government of General Yakubu Gowon during the Nigerian Civil War of 1967–1970.

=== Fate ===
Although the First Wilson Government had enacted a wide range of social reforms and arguably did much to reduce social inequalities during its time in office, the economic difficulties that it faced led to austerity measures being imposed on numerous occasions, forcing the government to abandon some of its key policy goals. Amongst the controversial austerity measures introduced included higher dental charges, the abolition of free school milk in all secondary schools in 1968, increased weekly National Insurance Contributions, the postponement of the planned rise in the school leaving age to 16, and cuts in road and housing programmes, which meant that the government's house-building target of 500,000 per year was never met. The government also failed to meet its 1964 manifesto commitment to tie increases in national insurance benefits to increases in average earnings, although this reform would later be implemented during Wilson's second premiership in 1975.

There was also much controversy over the government's decision to reintroduce Prescription charges in 1968 (after having abolished them in 1964), although the blow of this measure was arguably softened by the fact that many people were exempted from charges. In 1968, arguably in response to sensationalist stories about supposed "scroungers" and "welfare cheats", the government made the decision to introduce a controversial new rule terminating benefits for single men under the age of 45. Under this rule, known as the "four-week rule," young, single, unskilled men who lived in areas of low unemployment would have their supplementary benefits stopped after four weeks if there was employment in their locality and were fit to work. Another controversial change was brought in under which those who retired with a work pension after the age of 58 would (as noted by one study) "no longer be eligible for unemployment benefits."

Wilson's government also failed to maintain the real value of family allowances during its time in office, which (despite being doubled under Wilson) fell by 13% in real terms between 1964 and 1969. In addition, tax allowances were reduced in 1968 to pay in part for increases in family allowances, and despite inflation were not increased again until 1971. Family allowances were increased for the fourth and subsequent children from 50p to 75p per week in October 1966, and then in April 1967 to 75p for the second child and 85p for each subsequent child. According to one writer, however, this policy did not help single mothers with only one child, Supplementary Benefit payments were reduced "by the amount of this increase," and tax allowances were adjusted "to recover the cost of family allowances from taxpayers, including some low earners."

In the field of housing, the First Wilson Government has received criticism by historians for encouraging the building of high-rise council flats, continuing the high-rise boom launched by the preceding Conservative administration in 1956 when it introduced a progressive storey-height subsidy that gave large increments for four-, five-, and six-storey flats and a fixed increment for every additional storey above that. In 1966, tall flats accounted 25.6% of all approved starts, compared with only 3% in 1954. From 1964 to 1966, the percentage of homes built in England and Wales by local authorities and New Towns in the form of flats in buildings of 5 storeys or more rose from 22.4% to 25.7%, falling to 9.9% in 1970.

According to the historian Andrew Thorpe, much of the high-rise and high-density housing that was erected proved to be poorly constructed and unpopular with tenants, and social and extended family networks were disrupted by rehousing, leading to increased strain on social services and therefore public expenditure as older, informal support networks were ruptured. As argued by Thorpe, Labour's accomplishments "were equivocal, and in retrospect many would see its policies as leading to significant social problems."

According to another historian, Eric Shaw, in the rush to build, and to overcome shortages in funds, the First Wilson Government "succumbed to the fashion for high-rise blocks of flats." For Shaw, the housing drive demonstrated "flaws in Labour's centralist brand of social democracy," the assumption that the interests of ordinary people could be safeguarded by public officials without needing to consult them, "a well-intentioned but short-sighted belief that pledges could be honored by spreading resources more thinly; and a 'social engineering' approach to reform in which the calculation of the effects of institutional reform neglected their impact upon the overall quality of people's lives." This approach resulted in people being wrenched from their local communities and transferred to isolating and forbidding environments which often lacked basic social and commercial amenities and which hindered the revival of community networks. High-rise council flats, according to Shaw, intensified class inequalities by becoming a low-grade reserve for the poorer sections of the working class, which reflecting the "extent to which Keynesian social democracy had departed from the traditions of ethical socialism, with its aspirations to construct institutions which would foster greater fellowship, a communal spirit and more altruistic forms of behaviour." As further noted by Shaw, the "new soulless working-class estates" became the breeding grounds of a host of social evils, "as socialists from an older generation like William Morris could have predicted."

A plan to boost economic growth to 4% a year was never met, while development aid was cut severely as a result of austerity measures. A proposed "minimum income guarantee" for widows and pensioners was never implemented. Labour's record on tackling family poverty has also been criticised; one study from 1971 argues that "There appears to have been a reduction in the numbers of families with two or more children living in poverty between December 1966 and December 1968 – probably as a result of the increase of Family Allowances then; but between December 1968 and December 1970 there was no reduction."

In addition, the government's austerity measures led to an unpopular squeeze on consumption in 1968 and 1969.

By 1969, the Labour Party was suffering serious electoral reverses. In May 1970, Wilson responded to an apparent recovery in his government's popularity by calling a general election, but, to the surprise of most observers, was defeated at the polls by the Conservatives under Edward Heath.

== List of ministers ==
Members of the Cabinet are in bold face.

Office	Name	Dates	Notes
Prime Minister, First Lord of the Treasury and Minister for the Civil Service	**Harold Wilson**	16 October 1964 – 19 June 1970	
First Secretary of State	**George Brown**	16 October 1964	Office linked to Department of Economic Affairs until 29 August 1967
First Secretary of State	**Michael Stewart**	11 August 1966 – 18 March 1968	
First Secretary of State	**Barbara Castle**	6 April 1968	Office linked to Ministry of Employment
Lord High Chancellor of Great Britain	**Gerald Gardiner, Baron Gardiner**	16 October 1964	
Leader of the House of Commons; Lord President of the Council	**Herbert Bowden**	16 October 1964	
Leader of the House of Commons; Lord President of the Council	**Richard Crossman**	11 August 1966	
Leader of the House of Commons; Lord President of the Council	**Fred Peart**	18 October 1968	
Lord Keeper of the Privy Seal	**Frank Pakenham, 7th Earl of Longford**	18 October 1964	also Leader of the House of Lords
Lord Keeper of the Privy Seal	**Sir Frank Soskice**	23 December 1965	
Lord Keeper of the Privy Seal	**Frank Pakenham, 7th Earl of Longford**	6 April 1966	also Leader of the House of Lords
Lord Keeper of the Privy Seal	**Edward Shackleton, Baron Shackleton**	16 January 1968	also Leader of the House of Lords
Lord Keeper of the Privy Seal	**Fred Peart**	6 April 1968	
Lord Keeper of the Privy Seal	**Edward Shackleton, Baron Shackleton**	18 October 1968	also Leader of the House of Lords
Chancellor of the Exchequer	**James Callaghan**	16 October 1964	
Chancellor of the Exchequer	**Roy Jenkins**	30 November 1967	
Chief Secretary to the Treasury	John Diamond	20 October 1964	Office in Cabinet from 1 November 1968
Minister of State for Treasury	Dick Taverne	6 April 1968	
Minister of State for Treasury	Bill Rodgers	13 October 1969	
Parliamentary Secretary to the Treasury	Edward Short	18 October 1964	
Parliamentary Secretary to the Treasury	John Silkin	4 July 1966	
Parliamentary Secretary to the Treasury	Robert Mellish	30 April 1969	
Parliamentary Secretary to the Treasury	office vacant	31 May 1970	
Financial Secretary to the Treasury	Niall MacDermot	21 October 1964	
Financial Secretary to the Treasury	Harold Lever	29 August 1967	
Financial Secretary to the Treasury	Dick Taverne	13 October 1969	
Economic Secretary to the Treasury	Anthony Crosland	19 October 1964	de facto Minister of State for Economic Affairs. Office abolished 22 December 1964
Secretary of State for Economic Affairs	**George Brown**	16 October 1964	
Secretary of State for Economic Affairs	**Michael Stewart**	11 August 1966	
Secretary of State for Economic Affairs	**Peter Shore**	29 August 1967	Office abolished 6 October 1969
Minister of State for Economic Affairs	Anthony Crosland	20 October 1964	Nominally Economic Secretary to the Treasury until 22 December 1964
Minister of State for Economic Affairs	Austen Albu	27 January 1965 – 7 January 1967	
Minister of State for Economic Affairs	Thomas Urwin	6 April 1968 – 6 October 1969	
Under-Secretary of State for Economic Affairs	Maurice Foley	21 October 1964 – 6 April 1966	
Under-Secretary of State for Economic Affairs	Bill Rodgers	21 October 1964 – 7 January 1967	
Under-Secretary of State for Economic Affairs	Harold Lever	7 January 1967 – 29 August 1967	
Under-Secretary of State for Economic Affairs	Peter Shore	7 January 1967 – 29 August 1967	
Under-Secretary of State for Economic Affairs	Alan Williams	29 August 1967 – 6 October 1969	
Under-Secretary of State for Economic Affairs	Edmund Dell	29 August 1967 – 6 April 1968	
Lords of the Treasury	George Rogers	21 October 1964 – 11 January 1966	
Lords of the Treasury	George Lawson	21 October 1964 – 1 April 1967	
Lords of the Treasury	Jack McCann	21 October 1964 – 11 April 1966 and 29 July 1967 – 13 October 1969	
Lords of the Treasury	Ifor Davies	21 October 1964 – 6 April 1966	
Lords of the Treasury	Harriet Slater	21 October 1964 – 6 April 1966	
Lords of the Treasury	John Silkin	11 January 1966 – 11 April 1966	
Lords of the Treasury	Alan Fitch	16 April 1966 – 13 October 1969	
Lords of the Treasury	Joseph Harper	16 April 1966 – 19 June 1970	
Lords of the Treasury	William Whitlock	11 April 1966 – 7 July 1966 and 1 April 1967 – 28 July 1967	
Lords of the Treasury	William Howie	16 April 1966 – 1 April 1967	
Lords of the Treasury	Harry Gourlay	7 July 1966 – 1 April 1967	
Lords of the Treasury	Brian O'Malley	1 April 1967 – 13 October 1969	
Lords of the Treasury	Walter Harrison	29 October 1968 – 19 June 1970	
Lords of the Treasury	Neil McBride	13 October 1969 – 19 June 1970	
Lords of the Treasury	Ernest Perry	13 October 1969 – 19 June 1970	
Lords of the Treasury	Ernest Armstrong	13 October 1969 – 19 June 1970	
Secretary of State for Foreign Affairs	**Patrick Gordon Walker**	16 October 1964	
Secretary of State for Foreign Affairs	**Michael Stewart**	22 January 1965	
Secretary of State for Foreign Affairs	**George Brown**	11 August 1966	Resigned
Secretary of State for Foreign Affairs	**Michael Stewart**	16 March 1968	Merged with Commonwealth Office 17 October 1968
Foreign Secretary	**Michael Stewart**	17 October 1968	
Minister of State for Foreign Affairs	Hugh Foot, Baron Caradon	16 October 1964 – 19 June 1970	
Minister of State for Foreign Affairs	George Thomson	19 June 1964 – 6 April 1966 and 7 January 1967 – 29 August 1967	
Minister of State for Foreign Affairs	Walter Padley	19 October 1964 – 7 January 1967	
Minister of State for Foreign Affairs	Alun Gwynne Jones, Baron Chalfont	23 October 1964 – 19 June 1970	
Minister of State for Foreign Affairs	Eirene White	11 April 1966 – 7 January 1967	
Minister of State for Foreign Affairs	Frederick Mulley	7 January 1967 – 17 October 1968	Merged with Commonwealth Office 17 October 1968
Minister of State for Foreign Affairs	Goronwy Roberts	29 August 1967 – 17 October 1968	Merged with Commonwealth Office 17 October 1968
Minister of State for Foreign and Commonwealth Affairs	Frederick Mulley	17 October 1968 – 6 October 1969	
Minister of State for Foreign and Commonwealth Affairs	Goronwy Roberts	17 October 1968 – 13 October 1969	
Minister of State for Foreign and Commonwealth Affairs	Malcolm Shepherd, 2nd Baron Shepherd	17 October 1968 – 19 June 1970	
Parliamentary Under-Secretary of State for Foreign Affairs	Henry Walston, Baron Walston	20 October 1964	
Parliamentary Under-Secretary of State for Foreign Affairs	Bill Rodgers	7 January 1967	
Parliamentary Under-Secretary of State for Foreign Affairs	Maurice Foley	3 July 1968	Merged with Commonwealth Office 17 October 1968
Under-Secretary of State for Foreign and Commonwealth Affairs	Maurice Foley	17 October 1968 – 19 June 1970	
Under-Secretary of State for Foreign and Commonwealth Affairs	William Whitlock	17 October 1968 – 13 October 1969	
Under-Secretary of State for Foreign and Commonwealth Affairs	Evan Luard	13 October 1969 – 19 June 1970	
Home Secretary	**Sir Frank Soskice**	18 October 1964	
Home Secretary	**Roy Jenkins**	23 December 1965	
Home Secretary	**James Callaghan**	30 November 1967	
Minister of State for Home Affairs	Alice Bacon	19 October 1964	
Minister of State for Home Affairs	Victor Collins, Baron Stonham	29 August 1967	
Minister of State for Home Affairs	Shirley Williams	13 October 1969	
Under-Secretary of State for the Home Department	Victor Collins, Baron Stonham	20 October 1964 – 29 August 1967	
Under-Secretary of State for the Home Department	George Thomas	20 October 1964 – 6 April 1966	
Under-Secretary of State for the Home Department	Maurice Foley	6 April 1966 – 7 January 1967	
Under-Secretary of State for the Home Department	Dick Taverne	6 April 1966 – 6 April 1968	
Under-Secretary of State for the Home Department	David Ennals	7 January 1967 – 1 November 1968	
Under-Secretary of State for the Home Department	Elystan Morgan	6 April 1968 – 19 June 1970	
Under-Secretary of State for the Home Department	Merlyn Rees	1 November 1968 – 19 June 1970	
Minister of Agriculture, Fisheries and Food	**Fred Peart**	18 October 1964	
Minister of Agriculture, Fisheries and Food	**Cledwyn Hughes**	6 April 1968	
Parliamentary Secretary to the Ministry of Agriculture, Fisheries and Food	John Mackie	20 October 1964 – 19 June 1970	
Parliamentary Secretary to the Ministry of Agriculture, Fisheries and Food	James Hutchison Hoy	21 October 1964 – 19 June 1970	
Minister of State for Aviation	Roy Jenkins	18 October 1964	
Minister of State for Aviation	Frederick Mulley	23 December 1965	
Minister of State for Aviation	John Stonehouse	7 January 1967	Office abolished 15 February 1967
Parliamentary Secretary for Aviation	John Stonehouse	20 October 1964	
Parliamentary Secretary for Aviation	Julian Snow	6 April 1966	Office abolished 7 January 1967
Secretary of State for the Colonies	**Anthony Greenwood**	18 October 1964	
Secretary of State for the Colonies	**Francis Pakenham, 7th Earl of Longford**	23 December 1965	also Leader of the House of Lords
Secretary of State for the Colonies	**Frederick Lee**	6 April 1966	Under-Secretary of State for Commonwealth Affairs from 1 August 1966. Office abolished 7 January 1967
Under-Secretary of State for the Colonies	Eirene White	20 October 1964 – 11 October 1965	
Under-Secretary of State for the Colonies	Stephen Taylor, Baron Taylor	20 October 1964 – 11 April 1966	Also Under-Secretary at Commonwealth Relations
Under-Secretary of State for the Colonies	Frank Beswick, Baron Beswick	11 October 1965 – 1 August 1966	Also Under-Secretary at Commonwealth Relations
Secretary of State for Commonwealth Relations	**Arthur Bottomley**	18 October 1964	Merged into Secretary of State for Commonwealth Affairs
Secretary of State for Commonwealth Affairs	Herbert Bowden	11 August 1966	
Secretary of State for Commonwealth Affairs	George Thomson	29 August 1967	Merged with Foreign Office 17 October 1968
Minister of State for Commonwealth Relations	Cledwyn Hughes	19 October 1964 – 6 April 1966	Merged into Minister of State for Commonwealth Affairs
Minister of State for Commonwealth Affairs	Judith Hart	6 April 1966 – 26 July 1967	
Minister of State for Commonwealth Affairs	George Thomas	7 January 1967 – 6 April 1968	
Minister of State for Commonwealth Affairs	Malcolm Shepherd, 2nd Baron Shepherd	26 July 1967	Merged with Foreign Office 17 October 1968
Under-Secretary of State for Commonwealth Relations	Stephen Taylor, Baron Taylor	20 October 1964	Also Under-Secretary for the Colonies
Under-Secretary of State for Commonwealth Relations	Frank Beswick, Baron Beswick	11 October 1965	Also Under-Secretary for the Colonies until 1 August 1966
Under-Secretary of State for Commonwealth Affairs	Frank Beswick, Baron Beswick	1 August 1966	
Under-Secretary of State for Commonwealth Affairs	William Whitlock	26 July 1967	Merged with Foreign Office 17 October 1968
Secretary of State for Defence	**Denis Healey**	16 October 1964	
Minister of State for the Army	Frederick Mulley	19 October 1964	Also Deputy Secretary of State
Minister of State for the Army	Gerald Reynolds	24 December 1965	
Under-Secretary of State for the Army	Gerald Reynolds	20 October 1964	
Under-Secretary of State for the Army	Merlyn Rees	24 December 1965	
Under-Secretary of State for the Army	David Ennals	6 April 1966	
Under-Secretary of State for the Army	James Boyden	7 January 1967	
Under-Secretary of State for the Army	Ivor Richard	13 October 1969	
Minister of State for the Navy	Christopher Mayhew	19 October 1964	
Minister of State for the Navy	Joseph Mallalieu	19 February 1966	Office abolished 7 January 1967
Under-Secretary of State for the Navy	Joseph Mallalieu	21 October 1964	
Under-Secretary of State for the Navy	Ian Winterbottom, Baron Winterbottom	6 April 1966	
Under-Secretary of State for the Navy	Maurice Foley	7 January 1967	
Under-Secretary of State for the Navy	David Owen	3 July 1968	
Minister of State for the Air Force	The Lord Shackleton	19 October 1964	Office abolished 7 January 1967
Under-Secretary of State for the Air Force	Bruce Millan	20 October 1964	
Under-Secretary of State for the Air Force	Merlyn Rees	16 April 1966	
Under-Secretary of State for the Air Force	Ian Winterbottom, Baron Winterbottom	1 November 1968	
Minister of Defence for Administration	Gerald Reynolds	7 January 1967	
Minister of Defence for Administration	Roy Hattersley	15 July 1969	
Minister of Defence for Equipment	Roy Mason	7 January 1967	
Minister of Defence for Equipment	John Morris	16 April 1968	
Secretary of State for Education and Science	**Michael Stewart**	18 October 1964	
Secretary of State for Education and Science	**Anthony Crosland**	22 January 1965	
Secretary of State for Education and Science	**Patrick Gordon Walker**	29 August 1967	
Secretary of State for Education and Science	**Edward Short**	6 April 1968	
Minister of State for Education and Science	Bertram Bowden, Baron Bowden	19 October 1964 – 11 October 1965	
Minister of State for Education and Science	Reg Prentice	20 October 1964 – 6 April 1966	
Minister of State for Education and Science	Edward Redhead	11 October 1965 – 7 January 1967	
Minister of State for Education and Science	Goronwy Roberts	6 April 1966 – 29 August 1967	
Minister of State for Education and Science	Shirley Williams	7 January 1967 – 13 October 1969	
Minister of State for Education and Science	Alice Bacon	29 August 1967 – 19 June 1970	
Minister of State for Education and Science	Gerald Fowler	13 October 1969 – 19 June 1970	
Minister of State for the Arts	Jennie Lee	17 February 1967 – 19 June 1970	
Under-Secretary of State for Education	James Boyden	20 October 1964 – 24 February 1965	
Under-Secretary of State for Education	Denis Howell	20 October 1964 – 13 October 1969	
Under-Secretary of State for Education	Jennie Lee	24 February 1965 – 17 February 1967	Arts
Under-Secretary of State for Education	Joan Lestor	13 October 1969 – 19 June 1970	
Secretary of State for Employment and Productivity	**Barbara Castle**	6 April 1968	
Minister of State for Employment and Productivity	Edmund Dell	13 October 1969	
Under-Secretary of State for Employment	Ernest Fernyhough	6 April 1968 – 13 October 1969	
Under-Secretary of State for Employment	Roy Hattersley	6 April 1968 – 13 October 1969	
Under-Secretary of State for Employment	Harold Walker	6 April 1968 – 13 October 1969	
Minister of Health	Kenneth Robinson	18 October 1964	Office abolished 1 November 1968
Parliamentary Secretary to the Ministry of Health	Sir Barnett Stross	20 October 1964	
Parliamentary Secretary to the Ministry of Health	Charles Loughlin	24 February 1965	
Parliamentary Secretary to the Ministry of Health	Julian Snow	7 January 1967	
Secretary of State for Social Services	**Richard Crossman**	1 November 1968	Incl. Health
Minister of State for Social Services	Stephen Swingler	1 November 1968 – 19 February 1969	
Minister of State for Social Services	David Ennals	1 November 1968 – 19 June 1970	
Minister of State for Social Services	Beatrice Serota, Baroness Serota	25 February 1969 – 19 June 1970	
Under-Secretary of State for Social Services	Norman Pentland	1 November 1968 – 13 October 1969	
Under-Secretary of State for Social Services	Charles Loughlin	1 November 1968 – 20 November 1968	
Under-Secretary of State for Social Services	Julian Snow	1 November 1968 – 13 October 1969	
Under-Secretary of State for Social Services	Brian O'Malley	13 October 1969 – 19 June 1970	
Under-Secretary of State for Social Services	John Dunwoody	13 October 1969 – 19 June 1970	
Minister of Housing and Local Government	**Richard Crossman**	18 October 1964	
Minister of Housing and Local Government	Anthony Greenwood	11 August 1966	Office not in Cabinet from 6 October 1969
Minister of Housing and Local Government	Robert Mellish	31 May 1970	
Minister of State for Housing and Local Government	Frederick Willey	17 February 1967	
Minister of State for Housing and Local Government	Niall MacDermot	29 August 1967 – 28 September 1968	
Minister of State for Housing and Local Government	Denis Howell	13 October 1969	
Minister for Planning and Land	Kenneth Robinson	1 November 1968	Office abolished 6 October 1969
Parliamentary Secretary to the Ministry of Housing and Local Government	Robert Mellish	18 October 1964 – 29 August 1967	
Parliamentary Secretary to the Ministry of Housing and Local Government	James MacColl	20 October 1964 – 13 October 1969	
Parliamentary Secretary to the Ministry of Housing and Local Government	Wayland Young, 2nd Baron Kennet	6 April 1966 – 19 June 1970	
Parliamentary Secretary to the Ministry of Housing and Local Government	Arthur Skeffington	17 February 1967 – 19 June 1970	
Parliamentary Secretary to the Ministry of Housing and Local Government	Reginald Freeson	13 October 1969 – 19 June 1970	
Parliamentary Secretary to the Ministry of Housing and Local Government	Richard Marsh	20 October 1964 – 11 October 1965	
Parliamentary Secretary to the Ministry of Housing and Local Government	Ernest Thornton	21 October 1964 – 6 April 1966	
Parliamentary Secretary to the Ministry of Housing and Local Government	Shirley Williams	6 April 1966 – 7 January 1967	
Parliamentary Secretary to the Ministry of Housing and Local Government	Ernest Fernyhough	7 January 1967 – 6 April 1968	
Parliamentary Secretary to the Ministry of Housing and Local Government	Roy Hattersley	7 January 1967 – 6 April 1968	
Minister of Labour	Ray Gunter	18 October 1964	Reorganised as Secretary of State for Employment and Productivity 6 April 1968
Chancellor of the Duchy of Lancaster	**Douglas Houghton**	18 October 1964	
Chancellor of the Duchy of Lancaster	George Thomson	6 April 1966	Office not in Cabinet
Chancellor of the Duchy of Lancaster	Frederick Lee	7 January 1967	
Chancellor of the Duchy of Lancaster	**George Thomson**	6 October 1969	Office in Cabinet
Secretary of State for Local Government and Regional Planning	Anthony Crosland	6 October 1969	
Minister of State for Local Government and Regional Planning	Thomas Urwin	6 October 1969	
Minister for Land and Natural Resources	Frederick Willey	18 October 1964	Office wound up 17 February 1967
Parliamentary Secretary for Land and Natural Resources	Gilbert Mitchison, Baron Mitchison	October 1964 – 6 April 1966	
Parliamentary Secretary for Land and Natural Resources	Arthur Skeffington	21 October 1964 – 17 February 1967	
Minister of Overseas Development	**Barbara Castle**	18 October 1964	
Minister of Overseas Development	**Anthony Greenwood**	23 December 1965	
Minister of Overseas Development	**Arthur Bottomley**	11 August 1966	
Minister of Overseas Development	Reg Prentice	29 August 1967	Office no longer in Cabinet
Minister of Overseas Development	Judith Hart	6 October 1969	
Parliamentary Secretary to the Ministry of Overseas Development	Albert Oram	21 October 1964	
Parliamentary Secretary to the Ministry of Overseas Development	Ben Whitaker	13 October 1969	
Paymaster General	George Wigg	19 October 1964 – 12 November 1967	
Paymaster General	office vacant	12 November 1967	
Paymaster General	**Edward Shackleton, Baron Shackleton**	6 April 1968	also Leader of the House of Lords
Paymaster General	**Judith Hart**	1 November 1968	
Paymaster General	**Harold Lever**	6 October 1969	
Minister of Pensions and National Insurance	Margaret Herbison	18 October 1964	Minister of Social Security from 6 August 1966
Parliamentary Secretary to the Ministry of Pensions	Harold Davies	20 October 1964 – 6 August 1966	
Parliamentary Secretary to the Ministry of Pensions	Norman Pentland	21 October 1964 – 6 August 1966	
Minister without Portfolio	Sir Eric Fletcher	19 October 1964 – 6 April 1966	
Minister without Portfolio	Arthur Champion, Baron Champion	21 October 1964 – 7 January 1967	
Minister without Portfolio	**Douglas Houghton**	6 April 1966 – 7 January 1967	In Cabinet
Minister without Portfolio	**Edward Shackleton, Baron Shackleton**	7 January 1967 – 16 January 1968	
Minister without Portfolio	**Patrick Gordon Walker**	7 January 1967 – 21 August 1967	
Minister without Portfolio	**George Thomson**	17 October 1968 – 6 October 1969	
Minister without Portfolio	Peter Shore	6 October 1969 – 19 June 1970	
Postmaster-General	Tony Benn	19 October 1964	
Postmaster-General	Edward Short	4 July 1966	
Postmaster-General	Roy Mason	6 April 1968	
Postmaster-General	John Stonehouse	1 July 1968	Post Office became public corporation 1 October 1969
Assistant Postmaster-General	Joseph Slater	20 October 1964	
Minister for Posts and Telecommunications	John Stonehouse	1 October 1969	
Parliamentary Secretary to the Ministry of Posts and Telecommunications	Joseph Slater	1 October 1969	
Parliamentary Secretary to the Ministry of Posts and Telecommunications	Norman Pentland	13 October 1969	
Minister of Power	**Frederick Lee**	18 October 1964	
Minister of Power	**Richard Marsh**	6 April 1966	
Minister of Power	**Ray Gunter**	6 April 1968	
Minister of Power	**Roy Mason**	1 July 1968	Office abolished 6 October 1969
Parliamentary Secretary to the Ministry of Power	John Morris	21 October 1964	
Parliamentary Secretary to the Ministry of Power	George Lindgren, Baron Lindgren	10 January 1966	
Parliamentary Secretary to the Ministry of Power	Jeremy Bray	6 April 1966	
Parliamentary Secretary to the Ministry of Power	Reginald Freeson	7 January 1967 – 6 October 1969	
Minister of Public Building and Works	Charles Pannell	19 October 1964	
Minister of Public Building and Works	Reginald Prentice	6 April 1966	
Minister of Public Building and Works	Robert Mellish	29 August 1967	
Minister of Public Building and Works	John Silkin	30 April 1969	
Parliamentary Secretary to the Ministry of Public Building and Works	Jennie Lee	20 October 1964	Arts
Parliamentary Secretary to the Ministry of Public Building and Works	James Boyden	24 February 1965	
Parliamentary Secretary to the Ministry of Public Building and Works	Ian Winterbottom, Baron Winterbottom	7 January 1967	
Parliamentary Secretary to the Ministry of Public Building and Works	Charles Loughlin	20 November 1968	
Secretary of State for Scotland	Willie Ross	18 October 1964	
Minister of State for Scotland	George Willis	20 October 1964 – 7 January 1967	
Minister of State for Scotland	Dickson Mabon	7 January 1967 – 19 June 1970	
Minister of State for Scotland	William Hughes, Baron Hughes	13 October 1969 – 19 June 1970	
Under-Secretary of State for Scotland	William Hughes, Baron Hughes	21 October 1964 – 13 October 1969	
Under-Secretary of State for Scotland	Judith Hart	20 October 1964 – 6 April 1966	
Under-Secretary of State for Scotland	Dickson Mabon	21 October 1964 – 7 January 1967	
Under-Secretary of State for Scotland	Bruce Millan	6 April 1966 – 19 June 1970	
Under-Secretary of State for Scotland	Norman Buchan	7 January 1967 – 19 June 1970	
Minister of Social Security	Margaret Herbison	6 August 1966	
Minister of Social Security	Judith Hart	26 July 1967	Office abolished 1 November 1968 – thereafter Health & Social Security
Parliamentary Secretary to the Ministry of Social Security	Harold Davies	6 August 1966 – 7 January 1967	
Parliamentary Secretary to the Ministry of Social Security	Norman Pentland	6 August 1966 – 1 November 1968	
Parliamentary Secretary to the Ministry of Social Security	Charles Loughlin	7 January 1967 – 1 November 1968	
Minister of Technology	**Frank Cousins**	18 October 1964	
Minister of Technology	**Tony Benn**	4 July 1966	
Minister of State for Technology	John Stonehouse	15 February 1967 – 1 July 1968	
Minister of State for Technology	Joseph Mallalieu	1 July 1968 – 13 October 1969	
Minister of State for Technology	Reg Prentice	6 October 1969 – 10 October 1969	
Minister of State for Technology	George Delacourt-Smith, Baron Delacourt-Smith	13 October 1969 – 19 June 1970	
Minister of State for Technology	Eric Varley	13 October 1969 – 19 June 1970	
Parliamentary Secretary, Ministry of Technology	Julian Snow	19 October 1964 – 6 April 1966	
Parliamentary Secretary, Ministry of Technology	Richard Marsh	11 October 1965 – 6 April 1966	
Parliamentary Secretary, Ministry of Technology	Peter Shore	6 April 1966 – 7 January 1967	
Parliamentary Secretary, Ministry of Technology	Edmund Dell	6 April 1966 – 29 August 1967	
Parliamentary Secretary, Ministry of Technology	Jeremy Bray	7 January 1967 – 24 September 1969	
Parliamentary Secretary, Ministry of Technology	Gerald Fowler	29 August 1967 – 13 October 1969	
Parliamentary Secretary, Ministry of Technology	Alan Williams	6 October 1969 – 19 June 1970	
Parliamentary Secretary, Ministry of Technology	Neil Carmichael	13 October 1969 – 19 June 1970	
Parliamentary Secretary, Ministry of Technology	Ernest Davies	13 October 1969 – 19 June 1970	
President of the Board of Trade	**Douglas Jay**	18 October 1964	
President of the Board of Trade	**Anthony Crosland**	29 August 1967	
President of the Board of Trade	**Roy Mason**	6 October 1969	
Minister of State for Trade	George Darling	20 October 1964 – 6 April 1968	
Minister of State for Trade	Edward Redhead	20 October 1964 – 11 October 1965	
Minister of State for Trade	Roy Mason	20 October 1964 – 7 January 1967	
Minister of State for Trade	Wilfred Brown, Baron Brown	11 October 1965 – 19 June 1970	
Minister of State for Trade	Joseph Mallalieu	7 January 1967 – 1 July 1968	
Minister of State for Trade	Edmund Dell	6 April 1968 – 13 October 1969	
Minister of State for Trade	William Rodgers	1 July 1968 – 13 October 1969	
Minister of State for Trade	Goronwy Roberts	13 October 1969 – 19 June 1970	
Parliamentary Secretary to the Board of Trade	Hervey Rhodes, Baron Rhodes	20 October 1964	
Parliamentary Secretary to the Board of Trade	Henry Walston, Baron Walston	7 January 1967	
Parliamentary Secretary to the Board of Trade	Gwyneth Dunwoody	29 August 1967	
Minister of Transport	**Thomas Fraser**	18 October 1964	
Minister of Transport	**Barbara Castle**	23 December 1965	
Minister of Transport	**Richard Marsh**	6 April 1968	
Minister of Transport	Frederick Mulley	6 October 1969	Office no longer in Cabinet
Minister of State for Transport	Stephen Swingler	29 August 1967	Office vacant 1 November 1968
Parliamentary Secretary to the Ministry of Transport	George Lindgren, Baron Lindgren	20 October 1964 – 10 January 1966	
Parliamentary Secretary to the Ministry of Transport	Stephen Swingler	20 October 1964 – 29 August 1967	
Parliamentary Secretary to the Ministry of Transport	John Morris	10 January 1966 – 6 April 1968	
Parliamentary Secretary to the Ministry of Transport	Neil George Carmichael	29 August 1967 – 13 October 1969	
Parliamentary Secretary to the Ministry of Transport	Robert Brown	6 April 1968 – 19 June 1970	
Parliamentary Secretary to the Ministry of Transport	Albert Murray	13 October 1969 – 19 June 1970	
Secretary of State for Wales	James Griffiths	18 October 1964	
Secretary of State for Wales	Cledwyn Hughes	6 April 1966	
Secretary of State for Wales	George Thomas	6 April 1968	
Minister of State for Wales	Goronwy Roberts	20 October 1964	
Minister of State for Wales	George Thomas	6 April 1966	
Minister of State for Wales	Eirene White	7 January 1967	
Under-Secretary of State for Wales	Harold Finch	21 October 1964	
Under-Secretary of State for Wales	Ifor Davies	6 April 1966	
Under-Secretary of State for Wales	Edward Rowlands	13 October 1969	
Attorney General for England and Wales	Sir Elwyn Jones	18 October 1964	
Solicitor General for England and Wales	Sir Dingle Foot	18 October 1964	
Solicitor General for England and Wales	Sir Arthur Irvine	24 August 1967	
Lord Advocate	Gordon Stott	20 October 1964	Not an MP
Lord Advocate	Henry Wilson	26 October 1967	Not an MP
Solicitor General for Scotland	James Leechman	20 October 1964	Not an MP
Solicitor General for Scotland	Henry Wilson	11 October 1965	Not an MP
Solicitor General for Scotland	Ewan George Francis Stewart	26 October 1967	Not an MP
Treasurer of the Household	Sydney Irving	21 October 1964	
Treasurer of the Household	John Silkin	11 April 1966	
Treasurer of the Household	Charles Grey	7 July 1966	
Treasurer of the Household	Charles Richard Morris	13 October 1969	
Comptroller of the Household	Charles Grey	21 October 1964	
Comptroller of the Household	William Whitlock	7 July 1966	
Comptroller of the Household	William Howie	1 April 1967	
Comptroller of the Household	Ioan Evans	6 February 1968	
Vice-Chamberlain of the Household	William Whitlock	21 October 1964	
Vice-Chamberlain of the Household	Jack McCann	11 April 1966	
Vice-Chamberlain of the Household	Charles Richard Morris	29 July 1967	
Vice-Chamberlain of the Household	Alan Fitch	13 October 1969	
Chief Whip of the House of Lords; Captain of the Honourable Corps of Gentlemen-at-Arms	Malcolm Shepherd, 2nd Baron Shepherd	21 October 1964	
Chief Whip of the House of Lords; Captain of the Honourable Corps of Gentlemen-at-Arms	Frank Beswick, Baron Beswick	29 July 1967	
Deputy Chief Whip of the House of Lords; Captain of the Yeomen of the Guard	Frank Bowles, Baron Bowles	28 December 1964	
Lords in Waiting	Charles Hobson, Baron Hobson	21 October 1964 – 17 February 1966	
Lords in Waiting	Frank Beswick, Baron Beswick	28 December 1964 – 11 October 1965	
Lords in Waiting	Reginald Sorensen, Baron Sorensen	28 December 1964 – 20 April 1968	
Lords in Waiting	Norah Phillips, Baroness Phillips	10 December 1965 – 19 June 1970	
Lords in Waiting	Albert Hilton, Baron Hilton of Upton	6 April 1966 – 19 June 1970	
Lords in Waiting	Beatrice Serota, Baroness Serota	23 April 1968 – 25 February 1969	
Lords in Waiting	Annie Llewelyn-Davies, Baroness Llewelyn-Davies of Hastoe	13 March 1969 – 19 June 1970	

Preceded by Douglas-Home ministry	Government of the United Kingdom; 1964–1970	Succeeded by Heath ministry
