= Ministry of Pensions and National Insurance =

Department overview
- Formed: 1953
- Preceding agencies: Ministry of Pensions; Ministry of National Insurance
- Dissolved: 1966
- Superseding Department: Ministry of Social Security
- Jurisdiction: United Kingdom

The Ministry of Pensions and National Insurance (MPNI) was a British government ministry responsible for the administration and delivery of welfare benefits. It was headed by the Minister of Pensions and National Insurance.

== History ==
It was created in 1953 as a result of the amalgamation of the Ministry of Pensions and the Ministry of National Insurance.

In 1966, the Supplementary Benefits Commission (part of the National Assistance Board) was merged with the Ministry of Pensions and National Insurance to form the new Ministry of Social Security, as part of the Ministry of Social Security Act 1966.

In 1968, the Ministry of Social Security and the Ministry of Health were dissolved and their functions merged into the new Department of Health and Social Security.

== Ministers ==
Ministers of Pensions and National Insurance (1953–1966)
Minister	Term of office		Political party	Cabinet
Osbert Peake	3 September 1953	20 December 1955	Conservative	Churchill III
Osbert Peake	3 September 1953	20 December 1955	Conservative	Eden
John Boyd-Carpenter	20 December 1955	16 July 1962	Conservative	Eden
John Boyd-Carpenter	20 December 1955	16 July 1962	Conservative	Macmillan I
John Boyd-Carpenter	20 December 1955	16 July 1962	Conservative	Macmillan II
Niall Macpherson	16 July 1962	21 October 1963	Conservative	Macmillan II
Richard Wood	21 October 1963	16 October 1964	Conservative	Douglas-Home
Margaret Herbison	18 October 1964	6 August 1966	Labour	Wilson I
