= Richard Wood, Baron Holderness =

British politician (1920-2002)

The Right Honourable The Lord Holderness PC DL
- Official portrait, 1978

Minister of Overseas Development
- In office 23 June 1970 – 4 March 1974
- Prime Minister: Edward Heath
- Preceded by: Judith Hart
- Succeeded by: Judith Hart

Minister of Pensions and National Insurance
- In office 20 October 1963 – 18 October 1964
- Prime Minister: Alec Douglas-Home
- Preceded by: Niall Macpherson
- Succeeded by: Peggy Herbison

Minister of Power
- In office 14 October 1959 – 20 October 1963
- Prime Minister: Harold Macmillan
- Preceded by: The Lord Mills
- Succeeded by: Frederick Erroll

Member of the House of Lords
- Lord Temporal
- Life peerage 7 August 1979 – 11 August 2002

Member of Parliament for Bridlington
- In office 23 February 1950 – 7 April 1979
- Preceded by: Constituency established
- Succeeded by: John Townend

Personal details
- Born: Richard Frederick Wood; 5 October 1920 London, England
- Died: 11 August 2002 (aged 81) Bishop Wilton, England
- Party: Conservative
- Spouse: Diana Kellet (m. 1947)
- Children: 2
- Parent(s): Edward Wood, Lady Dorothy Evelyn Augusta Onslow
- Education: New College, Oxford

Richard Frederick Wood, Baron Holderness, PC, DL (5 October 1920 – 11 August 2002), was a British Conservative politician who held numerous ministerial positions from 1955 to 1974. He was distinctive in having lost both his legs in action in North Africa during World War II.

== Early life, education and military service ==
Richard Frederick Wood was born in London on 5 August 1920, the youngest son of Edward Wood, 1st Earl of Halifax, and Lady Dorothy Evelyn Augusta Onslow. Lady Dorothy was a daughter of the 4th Earl of Onslow. He was educated at St Cyprian's School in Eastbourne, Eton College and New College, Oxford. He became honorary attaché at the British Embassy in Rome in 1940, and in 1941 he gained the rank of lieutenant in the King's Royal Rifle Corps. He fought in the Middle East between 1941 and 1943. His elder brother Peter was killed in action in Egypt in 1942. On 30 December 1942, Richard Wood lost both legs after they were crushed by an undetonated bomb that landed on him. He was fitted with artificial limbs and spent the next three years meeting and speaking with disabled veterans at hospitals in the United States.

Wood returned to Britain in 1945 and resumed his studies at Oxford, reading politics, philosophy and economics. With Tony Benn, he ran the junior common room.

== Political career ==
Wood became MP for Bridlington in 1950 and held the seat until 1979. He was Parliamentary Private Secretary to Derick Heathcoat-Amory during his time successively as Minister of Pensions between 1951 and 1953, Minister of State at the Board of Trade between 1953 and 1954, and Minister of Agriculture and Fisheries between 1954 and 1955.

Wood was then Joint Parliamentary Secretary at the Ministry of Pensions and National Insurance between 1955 and 1958. He was minister of Labour between 1958 and 1959 and at the minister of Power between 1959 and 1963. Wood urged Prime Minister Anthony Eden not to respond to the Suez Crisis with overt aggression, but his advice was ignored because of his father's association with appeasement and the Munich Agreement.

In 1959 Wood was appointed a Privy Counsellor (P.C.) and was Minister of Pensions and National Insurance from 1963 until the Conservative Party lost power in 1964. When the Conservatives returned to power in 1970, he was Minister of Overseas Development for the duration of the Heath Government.

After he retired as an MP, Wood was given a life peerage on 7 August 1979 as Baron Holderness, of Bishop Wilton in the County of Humberside. From 1987 to 1991 he was an energetic chairman of the Disablement Services Authority, charged with the improvement of artificial limb services: he then served as a junior Minister on services for disabled people.

== Other work ==
Wood was a director of Hargreaves Group between 1974 and 1986 and also a director of FJC Lilley & Company. He sat on the Yorkshire and Humber regional board of Lloyds Bank from 1981 to 1990. From 1983 to 1986, he was president of Queen Elizabeth's Foundation for the Disabled.

== Honours ==
Wood became Honorary Colonel of the Queen's Royal Rifles in 1962 and Honorary Colonel of the 4th (Volunteer) Battalion, Royal Green Jackets between 1967 and 1969. He held the office of Deputy Lieutenant (D.L.) of the East Riding, Yorkshire in 1967. He was awarded the honorary degree of Doctor of Law (LL.D.) by Sheffield University in 1962, by Leeds University in 1978 and by Hull University in 1982.

== Personal life ==
In 1947, Wood married Diana Kellett, daughter of Colonel Edward Orlando Kellett. The couple had a daughter and a son.

Wood died in Bishop Wilton, in the East Riding of Yorkshire, on 11 August 2002, at the age of 81.

== Arms ==
Coat of arms of Richard Wood, Baron Holderness

Crest
A Savage as in the Arms the Shield Sable charged with a Griffin's Head erased Argent
Escutcheon
Quarterly: 1st and 4th, Azure three Naked savages ambulant in fess proper in the dexter hand of each a Shield Argent charged with a Cross Gules and in the sinister a Club resting on the shoulder also proper on a Canton Ermine three Lozenges conjoined in fess Sable (Wood); 2nd, Or three Torteaux a Label Azure (Courtenay); 4th, Or a Lion rampant Azure; overall on the centre for difference a Mullet Gules
Supporters
Dexter: an Officer of the King's Royal Rifle Corps circa 1904; Sinister: a Boar Sable armed unguled and bristled Or gorged with a Collar Argent thereon Cornish Choughs proper and pendant therefrom a Cinquefoil Argent resting the inner rear leg upon an Anchor bendwise Gold
Motto
I Still Like My Choice

Parliament of the United Kingdom
New constituency	Member of Parliament for Bridlington; 1950–1979	Succeeded by John Townend
Political offices
Preceded by Lord Mills	Minister of Power; 1959–1963	Succeeded by Frederick Erroll
Preceded by Niall Macpherson	Minister of Pensions and National Insurance; 1963–1964	Succeeded by Peggy Herbison
Preceded by Judith Hart	Minister of/for Overseas Development; 1970–1974	Succeeded by Judith Hart
