= Department of Health and Social Security =

British government ministry

Department overview
- Formed: 1968
- Preceding agencies: Ministry of Health; Ministry of Social Security
- Dissolved: 1988
- Superseding agencies: Department of Social Security; Department of Health
- Jurisdiction: United Kingdom
- Headquarters: London

The Department of Health and Social Security (commonly known as the DHSS) was a ministry of the British government in existence for twenty years from 1968 until 1988, and was headed by the Secretary of State for Social Services.

== History ==
In 1953, the Ministry of Pensions and the Ministry of National Insurance were merged to create the Ministry of Pensions and National Insurance. In 1966, the Supplementary Benefits Commission (part of the National Assistance Board) was merged with the Ministry of Pensions and National Insurance to form the new Ministry of Social Security, as part of the Ministry of Social Security Act 1966.

In 1968, the Ministry of Social Security and the Ministry of Health were dissolved and their functions merged into a new Department of Health and Social Security by an Order in Council which came into operation on 1 November 1968.

Although the department was titled 'Department of Health and Social Security', the title of the cabinet minister with responsibility for the department was 'secretary of state for social services'.

In 1988 the department was split again into a separate Department of Health and the Department of Social Security.

In 2001 the Department for Work and Pensions was formed from the Department of Social Security, absorbing the employment functions which had previously been the responsibility of the Department for Education and Employment since the dissolution of the Department of Employment in 1995.

== Ministers ==
- Secretary of State for Social Services
- Minister of State for Health
- Minister of State for Social Security

== Impact ==
Even three and a half decades after its abolition, the initials "DHSS" continue to be used by the general public to describe the Department for Work and Pensions or some of the benefits it provides (such as Income Support).

== References in popular culture ==
- Half Man Half Biscuit the notable cynico-rock group from The Wirral, UK, named their first album "Back in the DHSS" as a pun on the earlier single by the Beatles ("Back in the USSR") and a nod to the growing unemployment under the Thatcher administration of the 1980s.
- UB40 (a reggae group from Birmingham, whose first album was released in 1980) was named after the form issued by the DHSS to those claiming unemployment benefit, the full name of which was Unemployment Benefit form 40.
- British group Wham! mention the "DHSS" in their song "Wham Rap! (Enjoy What You Do)".
- Punk poet Attila the Stockbroker's poem "Russians in the DHSS" satirized the Cold War threat of the Soviet Union in Thatcher-era Britain.
- In The Young Ones episode "Bomb" Rick attempts to write a threatening telegram to the British Government through a DHSS office which he mistakes for the post office.
- In Yes Minister it is mentioned by one of the characters, when sitting in a round-table meeting in relation to equal opportunities for women.
