= Ministry of Social Security (United Kingdom) =

British government ministry

Department overview
- Formed: 1966
- Preceding agencies: Supplementary Benefits Commission; Ministry of Pensions and National Insurance
- Dissolved: 1968
- Superseding Department: Department of Health and Social Security
- Jurisdiction: United Kingdom
- Headquarters: London

In 1966, the Supplementary Benefits Commission (part of the National Assistance Board) was merged with the Ministry of Pensions and National Insurance to form the new Ministry of Social Security, as part of the Ministry of Social Security Act 1966.

In November 1968, the Ministry of Health and the Ministry of Social Security were merged to create the new Department of Health and Social Security (DHSS).

== Ministers ==
Ministers of Social Security (1966–1968)
Minister	Term of office		Political party	Cabinet
Margaret Herbison	6 August 1966	26 July 1967	Labour	Wilson II
Judith Hart	26 July 1967	1 November 1968	Labour	Wilson II
