= Judith Hart =

British politician

The Right Honourable The Baroness Hart of South Lanark DBE PC

Chair of the National Executive Committee
- In office 24 November 1981 – 24 November 1982
- Leader: Michael Foot
- Preceded by: Alec Kitson
- Succeeded by: Sam McCluskie

Minister for Overseas Development
- In office 21 February 1977 – 4 May 1979
- Prime Minister: James Callaghan
- Preceded by: Frank Judd
- Succeeded by: Neil Marten
- In office 7 April 1974 – 10 June 1975
- Prime Minister: Harold Wilson
- Preceded by: Richard Wood
- Succeeded by: Reg Prentice
- In office 6 October 1969 – 19 June 1970
- Prime Minister: Harold Wilson
- Preceded by: Reg Prentice
- Succeeded by: Richard Wood

Shadow Minister for Overseas Development
- In office 4 May 1979 – 8 December 1980
- Leader: James Callaghan
- Preceded by: Richard Luce
- Succeeded by: Frank McElhone
- In office 19 June 1970 – 7 April 1974
Ministerial Offices 1964–69
| Leader | Harold Wilson |
| Preceded by | Bernard Braine |
| Succeeded by | Richard Wood |
Paymaster General
In office 1 November 1968 – 6 October 1969
| Prime Minister | Harold Wilson |
| Preceded by | The Lord Shackleton |
| Succeeded by | Harold Lever |
Minister of Social Security
In office 26 July 1967 – 1 November 1968
| Prime Minister | Harold Wilson |
| Preceded by | Peggy Herbison |
| Succeeded by | Richard Crossman (as Secretary of State for Social Services) |
Minister of State for Commonwealth Affairs
In office 6 April 1966 – 26 July 1967
| Prime Minister | Harold Wilson |
| Preceded by | Cledwyn Hughes |
| Succeeded by | George Thomas |
Under-Secretary of State for Scotland
In office 20 October 1964 – 6 April 1966
| Prime Minister | Harold Wilson |
| Preceded by | Anthony Stodart |
| Succeeded by | Bruce Millan |

Member of Parliament for Clydesdale Lanark (1959–1983)
- In office 8 October 1959 – 18 May 1987
- Preceded by: Patrick Francis Maitland
- Succeeded by: Jimmy Hood

Personal details
- Born: Constance Mary Ridehalgh; 18 September 1924 Burnley, Lancashire, England
- Died: 7 December 1991 (aged 67) London, England
- Party: Labour
- Spouse: Anthony Bernard Hart (m. 1946)
- Children: 2
- Education: London School of Economics; University of London
- Occupation: Politician

Constance Mary Hart, Baroness Hart of South Lanark, DBE, PC (née Ridehalgh; 18 September 1924 – 7 December 1991), also known as Dame Judith Hart, was a British Labour Party politician. She served as a Member of Parliament for 28 years, from 1959 to 1987. She served as a government minister during the 1960s and 1970s before entering the House of Lords in 1988.

== Early life and education ==
Hart was born on 18 September 1924 in Burnley, Lancashire, England. Her mother died when she was eleven years old; a year later, she adopted the name Judith on a train to London. She was educated at Clitheroe Royal Grammar School, the London School of Economics and the University of London. At school, she was head girl until she "took a day off school to visit the Tate Gallery in London and refused to apologise for doing so".

== Political career ==
After joining the Labour Party aged 18, Hart was unsuccessful Labour candidate for Bournemouth West in 1951. She stood again in Aberdeen South in 1955 in "The Battle of the Housewives" but lost to Lady Tweedsmuir. She was elected as member for Lanark in 1959, winning by 700 votes after she arranged postal votes for displaced miners. She held the seat until 1983. Thereafter she sat for Clydesdale until 1987.

She held ministerial office as joint Parliamentary Under-Secretary of State for Scotland from 1964 to 1966, Minister of State, Commonwealth Office (1966–1967), Minister of Social Security (1967–68), Paymaster General (with a seat in the Cabinet, and the first female holder) from 1968 to 1969, and as Minister of Overseas Development from 1969 to 1970, 1974 to 1975 (when she resigned; see below) and 1977 to 1979. In so doing, she became the fifth woman to have been included in a government cabinet in the history of Britain. She was also the first female Paymaster-General in Britain.

In opposition, Hart was frontbench spokesman on overseas aid from 1970 to 1974 and 1979 to 1980. Her views were often controversial and in 1972 she was mailed a bomb over her controversial work with the Labour Party's Southern African Liberation Fund. In 1974, when Labour returned to power, Hart was nearly passed over for a ministerial post due to her and her husband's connections to communism. Prime Minister Harold Wilson eventually decided to appoint her as Minister of Overseas Development, but she was never again appointed to Cabinet due to security concerns.

A trained sociologist, Hart frequently spoke and wrote on international development. She wrote several books, including Aid and Liberation: A Socialist Study of Aid Politics, published in 1973. Nonetheless, her opposition to British membership of the European Economic Community (EEC), which she believed would have a negative impact on British aid to the third world, ensured that she would be a casualty of Wilson's purge of the "anti-marketeers" following the outcome of the referendum on EEC membership in 1975. Although Wilson tried to send her to the Department of Transport, she resigned from all ministerial responsibility in protest. Later, following her return as Minister of Overseas Development in 1977, Hart developed a plan to redistribute British aid to prioritise the poorest countries, but it conflicted with diplomatic and trade priorities and was thwarted by the Conservative victory at the 1979 general election.

She was co-chairman of the Women's National Commission (appointed by the government) from 1969 to 1970. Within the Labour Party she was a member of the National Executive Committee from 1969 to 1983, serving as vice-chairman in 1980–81, and as chairman in 1981–82. She was appointed a Privy Counsellor in 1967, and appointed a DBE in 1979.

On 8 February 1988, she was created a life peer, as Baroness Hart of South Lanark, of Lanark in the County of Lanark.

== Personal life ==
She met her husband, Dr Anthony Bernard Hart (always known as Tony), at an Association of Scientific Workers meeting. They married in 1946 and had two sons. He was also politically active, but when they were both selected as candidates for the Labour party in 1959, he withdrew his candidacy to support her campaign.

The family relocated to London in 1961 to allow Hart more family time. When Hart was appointed Minister of State for Commonwealth Affairs in 1966, her mother-in-law moved in to help with the children.

According to her son, Hart was a functional alcoholic and smoked 60 cigarettes a day.

== Death ==
She died of bone cancer at the Queen Mary's Hospital, Roehampton, London, in 1991, aged 67.

== Sources ==
Sutherland, Duncan (May 2008). "Hart, Judith, Baroness Hart of South Lanark (1924–1991)". Oxford Dictionary of National Biography (online ed.). Oxford University Press. doi:10.1093/ref:odnb/49767. (Subscription, Wikipedia Library access or UK public library membership required.)

Parliament of the United Kingdom
| Preceded by Patrick Maitland | Member of Parliament for Lanark; 1959–1983 | Constituency abolished |
| New constituency | Member of Parliament for Clydesdale; 1983–1987 | Succeeded by Jimmy Hood |
Political offices
| Preceded by Peggy Herbison | Minister of Social Security; 1967–1968 | Succeeded by Richard Crossman as Secretary of State for Social Services |
| Preceded by The Lord Shackleton | Paymaster General; 1968–1969 | Succeeded by Harold Lever |
| Preceded by Reg Prentice | Minister of Overseas Development; 1969–1970 | Succeeded by Richard Wood |
| Preceded by Richard Wood | Minister for Overseas Development; 1974–1975 | Succeeded by Reg Prentice |
| Preceded by Frank Judd | Minister for Overseas Development; 1977–1979 | Succeeded by Neil Marten |
Party political offices
| Preceded by Alec Kitson | Chair of the Labour Party; 1981–1982 | Succeeded by Sam McCluskie |
