= Peggy Herbison =

British politician (1907–1996)

The Right Honourable Peggy Herbison

Her Majesty's High Commissioner to the General Assembly of the Church of Scotland
- In office 1970–1971
- Monarch: Elizabeth II
- Preceded by: The Lord Reith
- Succeeded by: The Lord Clydesmuir

Minister of Social Security Minister of Pensions and National Insurance (1964–1966)
- In office 18 October 1964 – 26 July 1967
- Prime Minister: Harold Wilson
- Preceded by: Richard Wood
- Succeeded by: Judith Hart

Member of Parliament for North Lanarkshire
- In office 5 July 1945 – 29 May 1970
- Preceded by: William Anstruther-Gray
- Succeeded by: John Smith

Personal details
- Born: Margaret McCrorie Herbison; 11 March 1907 Shotts, Lanarkshire, Scotland
- Died: 29 December 1996 (aged 89) Lanark, Scotland
- Party: Labour
- Education: University of Glasgow
- Occupation: Politician
- Profession: Teacher

Margaret McCrorie Herbison PC (11 March 1907 – 29 December 1996) was a Scottish Labour politician who was Minister of Social Security from 1964 to 1967.

== Early life ==
Herbison was born on 11 March 1907 in Shotts, Lanarkshire to Maria Jane McCrorie and John Herbison, a coal miner. She was schooled at Dykehead primary school and Bellshill Academy. She attended the University of Glasgow graduating with an MA in English in 1928. While at university she chaired its Labour Party branch. From 1930 to 1945 Herbison worked as a teacher of English and history at Maryhill primary school and Alan Glen's secondary school, both in Glasgow. She also worked as an economics tutor at the National Council of Labour Colleges, and served on the Miners' Welfare Commission. During this time she was active in local Labour politics.

== Political career ==
After the death of her father in the coal mine in which he worked, his miners' lodge nominated her as a candidate for the North Lanarkshire constituency. She won the nomination, and subsequently took the seat at the General Election of 1945 from the Conservative Sir William Anstruther Grey.

In government, she held office as Joint Parliamentary Under-Secretary of State for Scotland from 1950 to 1951, as Minister of Pensions and National Insurance from 1964 to 1966, and as Minister of Social Security from 1966 to 1967. She was opposition spokesperson on Scotland (1951–1956, 1959–1962), Education (1956–1959), and Pensions (1958–1959 and 1962–1964).

She was a Member of Labour National Executive Committee, and Labour Party Chairman in 1957. In the House of Commons, she was Chairman of Select Committee on Overseas Aid in 1969–70. She was an early British delegate to the Council of Europe, and is believed to be the only woman parliamentary Representative - among 101 accredited in total, from twelve nations - to attend the very first sitting of the Council's Parliamentary Assembly in Strasbourg in August 1949, alongside Winston Churchill among others.

Herbison said in 1951, "Difficult times always hit women harder than men ... There’s no five-day week for women, and when there's shopping to do on a wet Saturday – and the children are cross, and then on top of it all the grocer says, 'Halfpenny up on this' or 'Penny up on that' – well, it sometimes seems almost unbearable, doesn’t it?".

== Personal life ==
A lifelong member of the Church of Scotland, from 1970 to 1971 she became the first woman to serve as Lord High Commissioner to the General Assembly of the Church of Scotland.

In 1970 the University of Glasgow awarded her an honorary degree.

In 1970 she was named 'Scotswoman of the Year'.

She died of cancer on 29 December 1996 at St Mary's Hospital, Lanark.

Parliament of the United Kingdom
Preceded by William Anstruther-Gray	Member of Parliament for North Lanarkshire; 1945–1970	Succeeded by John Smith
Political offices
Preceded by Richard Wood	Minister of Pensions and National Insurance; 1964–1966	Succeeded by Herself as Minister of Social Security
Preceded by Herself as Minister of Pensions and National Insurance	Minister of Social Security; 1966–1967	Succeeded by Judith Hart
Party political offices
Preceded by Edwin Gooch	Chair of the Labour Party; 1956–1957	Succeeded by Tom Driberg
