= Ministry of Social Security Act 1966 =

Act of the Parliament of the United Kingdom

- Act of Parliament
- Parliament of the United Kingdom
- Long title: An Act to provide for the appointment of a Minister of Social Security and the transfer to him of the functions of the Minister of Pensions and National Insurance and of certain functions of the National Assistance Board; to replace Part II of the National Assistance Act 1948 by provisions giving rights to non-contributory benefit; and for purposes connected with those matters.
- Citation: 1966 c. 20

Dates
- Royal assent: 3 August 1966
- Commencement: various (Note: Section 40. The Ministry of Social Security Act 1966 (Commencement) Order 1966 (SI 1966/986).)
- Repealed: 15 November 1976
Other legislation
Amends	Polish Resettlement Act 1947; National Assistance Act 1948; National Insurance &c. Act 1964; Ministers of the Crown Act 1964
Amended by	Legal Aid (Scotland) Act 1967; Tribunals and Inquiries Act 1971; Legal Aid Act 1974; Statute Law (Repeals) Act 1974; Social Security (Consequential Provisions) Act 1975; House of Commons Disqualification Act 1975; Northern Ireland Assembly Disqualification Act 1975; Child Benefit Act 1975
Repealed by	Supplementary Benefits Act 1976

Status: Repealed

The Ministry of Social Security Act 1966 (c. 20) or the Supplementary Benefit Act 1966 was an act of the Parliament of the United Kingdom to establish the Supplementary Benefits Scheme whereby the National Assistance Board was transformed into the Supplementary Benefit Board. By merging this with the Ministry of Pensions and National Insurance, the new Ministry of Social Security was created. The act received royal assent on 3 August 1966.

== Subsequent developments ==
Section 39(3) of, and schedule 8 to, the act were repealed by section 1 of, and part XI of the schedule to, the Statute Law (Repeals) Act 1974, which came into force on 27 June 1974.

The whole act, so far as unrepealed, was repealed by section 35(3) of, and part I of schedule 8 to, the Supplementary Benefits Act 1976, which came into force on 15 November 1976.
