= Ministry of Pensions =

Department overview
- Formed: 1916
- Dissolved: 1953
- Superseding Department: Ministry of Pensions and National Insurance
- Jurisdiction: United Kingdom

The Ministry of Pensions was a British government ministry responsible for the administration and delivery of pensions. It was headed by the Minister of Pensions.

== History ==
In September 1916, a Cabinet Committee on Pensions recommended that the work of the War Office, Chelsea Hospital commissioners and Central Army Pensions Issue Office should be taken over by a Pensions Board. The Ministry of Pensions Act 1916 created a single Ministry of Pensions to administer naval and military war pensions to former members of the Armed Forces and their dependants, and to provide medical care for the disabled.

It was expanded rapidly during the opening months of the Second World War by secondment of civil servants from the Inland Revenue and other government departments. In 1940, most of the Ministry was moved to Cleveleys, north of Blackpool, Lancashire. This central office kept records of pensions granted, issued pension books and prepared cases for appeal tribunals. The Rossall School was taken over initially, but later several hundred employees worked in prefabricated one-storey office buildings assembled on a site that had been part of the Holt's farm in the Norcross section of Carleton. The Ministry moved to buildings on Millbank in London in 1949.

In 1953, the functions of the Ministry of Pensions were merged with those of the Ministry of National Insurance into a new Ministry of Pensions and National Insurance.

== Ministers ==
Ministers of Pensions (1916–1953)
Minister	Term of office		Political party	Cabinet
George Nicoll Barnes	10 December 1916	17 August 1917	Labour	Lloyd George
John Hodge	17 August 1917	10 January 1919	Labour	Lloyd George
Laming Worthington-Evans	10 January 1919	2 April 1920	Conservative	Lloyd George
Ian Macpherson	2 April 1920	19 October 1922	Liberal	Lloyd George
George Tryon	31 October 1922	22 January 1924	Conservative	Law
George Tryon	31 October 1922	22 January 1924	Conservative	Baldwin I
Frederick Roberts	23 January 1924	3 November 1924	Labour	MacDonald I
George Tryon	11 November 1924	4 June 1929	Conservative	Baldwin II
Frederick Roberts	7 June 1929	24 August 1931	Labour	MacDonald II
George Tryon	3 September 1931	18 June 1935	Conservative	National I
George Tryon	3 September 1931	18 June 1935	Conservative	National II
Robert Hudson	18 June 1935	30 July 1936	Conservative	National III
Herwald Ramsbotham	30 July 1936	7 June 1939	Conservative	National III
Herwald Ramsbotham	30 July 1936	7 June 1939	Conservative	National IV
Walter Womersley	7 June 1939	26 July 1945	Conservative	Chamberlain War
Walter Womersley	7 June 1939	26 July 1945	Conservative	Churchill War
Walter Womersley	7 June 1939	26 July 1945	Conservative	Churchill Caretaker
Wilfred Paling	3 August 1945	17 April 1947	Labour	Attlee
John Burns Hynd	17 April 1947	7 October 1947	Labour	Attlee
George Buchanan	7 October 1947	2 July 1948	Labour	Attlee
Hilary Marquand	2 July 1948	17 January 1951	Labour	Attlee
George Isaacs	17 January 1951	26 October 1951	Labour	Attlee
Derick Heathcoat-Amory	5 November 1951	3 September 1953	Conservative	Churchill III
