= National Assistance Board =

The National Assistance Board was established by the National Assistance Act 1948 (11 & 12 Geo. 6. c. 29) and abolished in by the Ministry of Social Security Act 1966. It was preceded by the Unemployment Assistance Board (known from 1941 as the Assistance Board) and succeeded by the Supplementary Benefit Commission.

There was a separate National Assistance Board of Northern Ireland.

The National Assistance Act 1948 required local authorities, under the control of the board, to provide residential accommodation for older and disabled people ‘in need of care and attention which is not otherwise available to them’. They were also able to register and inspect homes run by charitable (non-profit) and private (for profit) organizations and to contribute to independent organisations providing ‘recreation or meals for old people’ or themselves provide these, or day centres, clubs etc.

The Act created an additional, separate system of Resettlement Centres for the homeless, where people "without a settled way of living may be influenced to lead a more settled "life, and the Board shall provide and maintain centres, to be known as reception centres, for the provision of temporary board and lodging for such persons."

== Staff ==
Sir Harold Fieldhouse was Secretary of the Board from 1948 until 1959 when he was succeeded by Sir Donald Sargent. The Under-Secretary from 1946–1950 was Hubert Bentliff.

== Public depiction ==
In 1970 the Brighton Combination, of which Jim Carter was a member presented The NAB Show, a politically orientated account of the Board.

== Chairs ==
- George Buchanan 1948–1953
- Geoffrey Hutchinson MP 1954–1964

== Other members ==
- William Asbury 1950–1961
- Edwin Bayliss 1961–1967
- H. M. Hallsworth 1948–1949
- Alice Johnston member of the Royal Commission on Local Government in Greater London
- William Leonard 1955–1960
- Mary McAlister 1961–1966
- George William Martin 1948–1956
- Percy Morris 1960–1966
- Harry Pigott 1957–1966
