= Churchill caretaker ministry =

UK Government, May–July 1945

- Cabinet of the United Kingdom
- May–July 1945
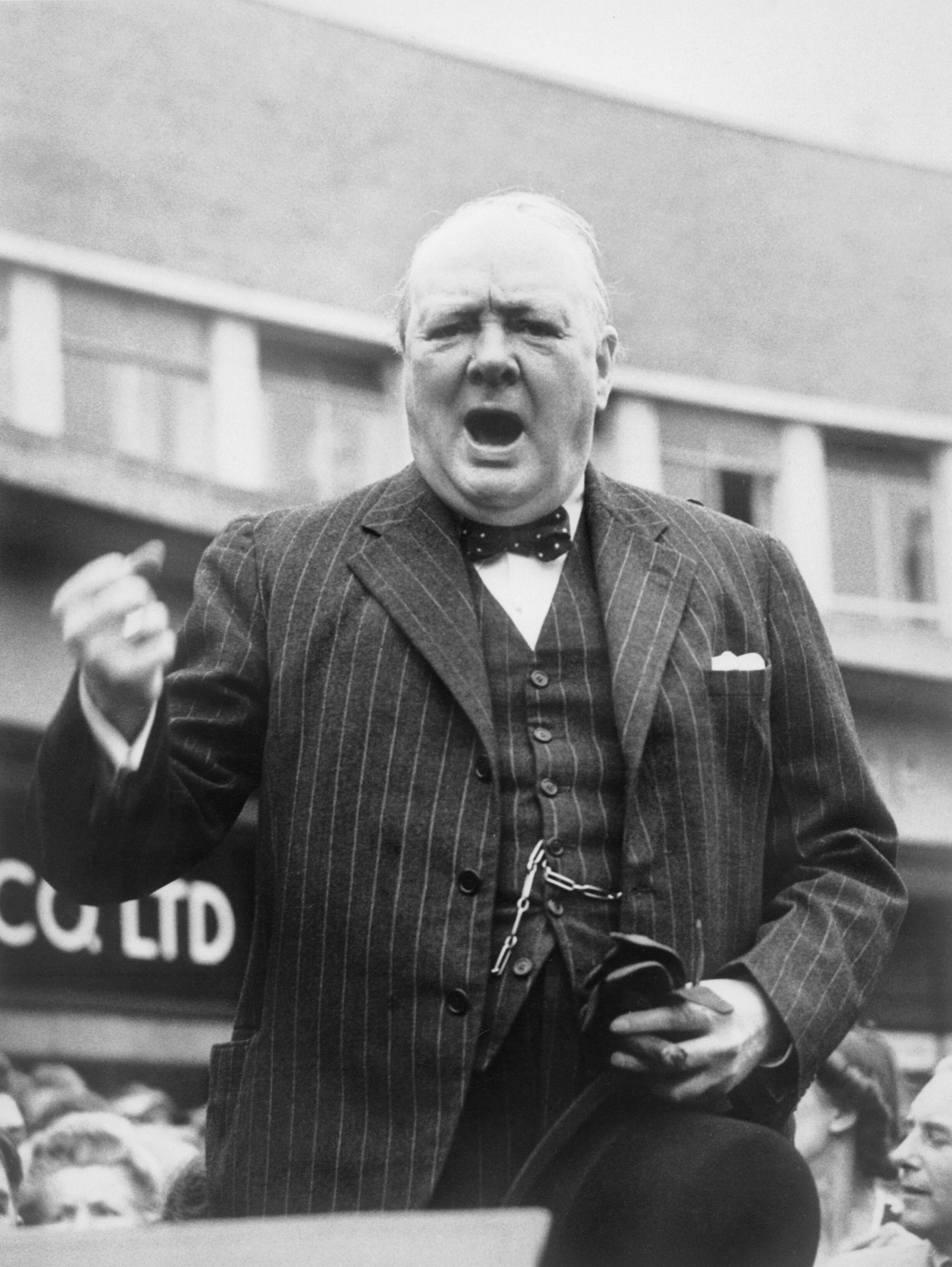
- Winston Churchill speaking on 27 June 1945 during the general election campaign
- Date formed: 23 May 1945
- Date dissolved: 26 July 1945

People and organisations
- Monarch: George VI
- Prime Minister: Winston Churchill
- Prime Minister's history: 1940–1945
- Deputy Prime Minister: none appointed (Note: Anthony Eden did not acquire the title of Deputy Prime Minister of the United Kingdom during the caretaker ministry. He did however serve as Deputy Leader of the Conservative Party.)
- Total no. of members: 92 appointments
- Member parties: Conservative Party; Liberal National Party; Independents
- Status in legislature: Majority (coalition)
- Opposition party: Labour Party
- Opposition leader: Clement Attlee

History
- Outgoing election: 1945 general election
- Legislature terms: 37th UK Parliament
- Predecessor: Churchill war ministry
- Successor: Attlee ministry

The Churchill caretaker ministry was a short-term United Kingdom (UK) government during the latter stages of the Second World War, from 23 May to 26 July 1945. The prime minister was Winston Churchill, leader of the Conservative Party. This government succeeded the Churchill war ministry which he had formed after he was first appointed prime minister on 10 May 1940. The coalition, which had comprised leading members of the Conservative, Labour, and Liberal parties, was terminated soon after the defeat of Nazi Germany because the parties could not agree on whether it should continue until after the defeat of Japan.

The caretaker government continued to fight the war against Japan in the Far East, but Churchill's focus was on preparation for the Potsdam Conference where he and his foreign secretary Anthony Eden would meet Soviet dictator Joseph Stalin and US President Harry Truman. The main concern on the home front, however, was post-war recovery including the need for reform in key areas such as education, health, housing, industry, and social welfare. Campaigning mostly on those issues, the parties canvassed for support in the forthcoming general election, the first held in the UK since 1935. The general election was held on 5 July but, allowing time to collect the large numbers of votes by overseas service personnel, the result was not announced until 26 July. It was a landslide victory for Labour. Churchill thereupon resigned as prime minister, and was succeeded by his erstwhile coalition deputy Clement Attlee, who formed a Labour government.

== Background ==
Stanley Baldwin, who had just become Prime Minister for the third time, won a large majority at the 1935 general election. In May 1937, Baldwin retired and was succeeded by Neville Chamberlain who continued Baldwin's foreign policy of appeasement in the face of German, Italian and Japanese aggression. Having signed the Munich Agreement with Hitler in 1938, Chamberlain became alarmed by the dictator's continuing aggression and, in March 1939, signed the Anglo-Polish military alliance which supposedly guaranteed British support for Poland if attacked. Chamberlain issued the declaration of war against Nazi Germany on 3 September 1939 and formed a war cabinet which included Winston Churchill (out of office since June 1929) as First Lord of the Admiralty.

Dissatisfaction with Chamberlain's leadership became widespread in the spring of 1940 after Germany successfully invaded Norway. In response, the House of Commons held the Norway Debate from 7 to 9 May. At the end of the second day, the Labour opposition forced a division which was in effect a motion of no confidence in Chamberlain. The government's majority of 213 was reduced to 81, still a victory but in the circumstances a shattering blow for Chamberlain.

Two days later on Friday, 10 May, Germany launched its invasion of the Netherlands and Belgium. Chamberlain had been contemplating resignation but then changed his mind because he felt a change of government at such a time would be inappropriate. Later that day, the Labour Party decided that they could not join a national coalition under Chamberlain's leadership but agreed to do so under a different Conservative prime minister. Chamberlain now resigned and advised the King to appoint Churchill as his successor. Churchill quickly created the national coalition, granting key roles to leading figures in the Labour and Liberal parties. Churchill liked to call the wartime government the “Grand Coalition”. The coalition held firm despite some critical setbacks and, ultimately, in alliance with the Soviet Union and the United States, Britain was able to defeat Nazi Germany.

== Plans to extend the coalition ==
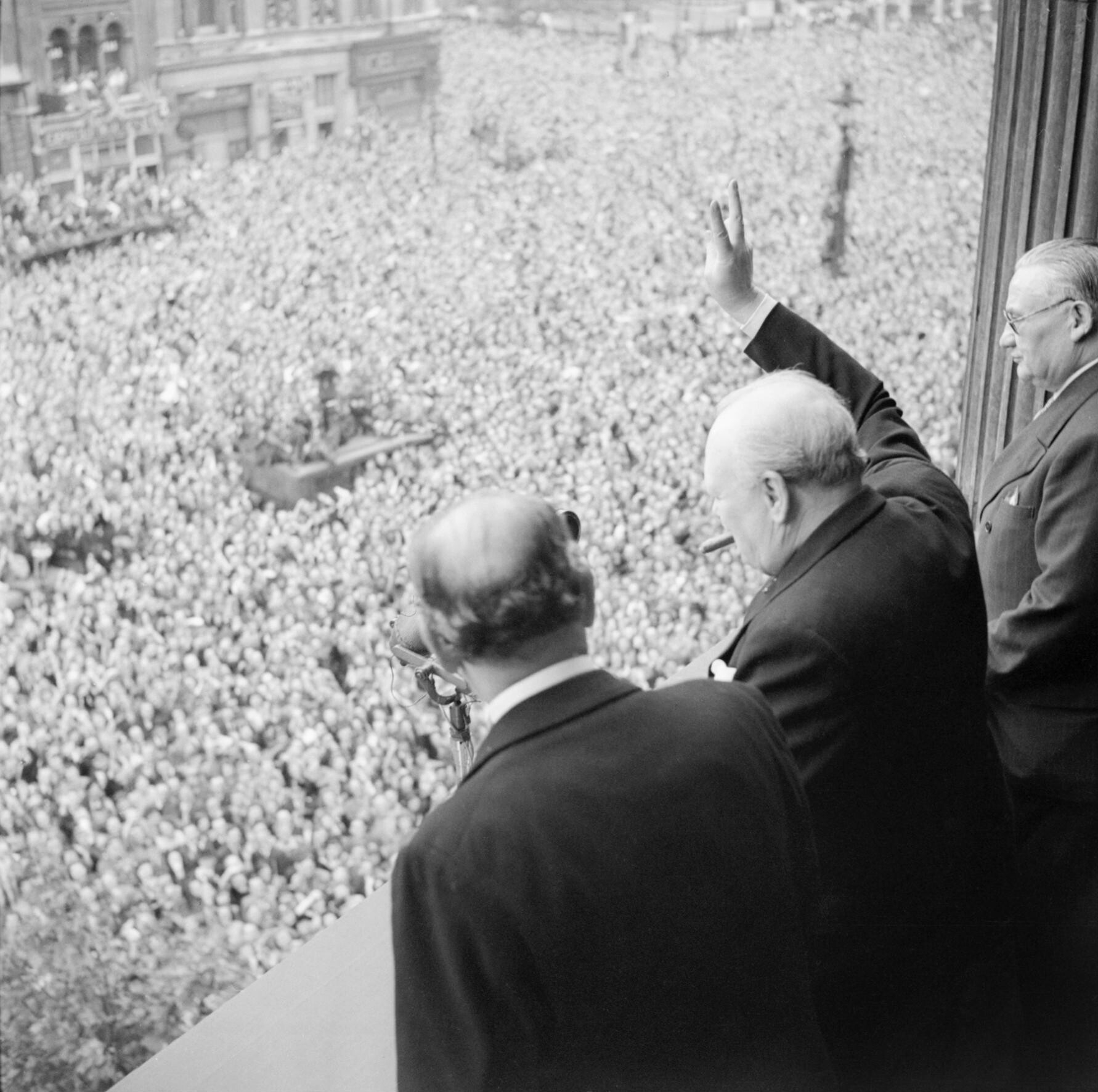
Winston Churchill (c) with Ernest Bevin (r) and Sir John Anderson (l) waving to the crowds in Whitehall on VE Day. Anderson joined the caretaker ministry but Bevin and his Labour colleagues did not.

In October 1944, Churchill had addressed the House of Commons and moved to extend Parliament by a further year pending the final defeat of Nazi Germany and, if possible, Japan. There had not been a general election since 1935 and Churchill was determined to hold one as soon as hostilities ceased. While he could not accurately predict the end of the war against Japan, he was confident that Germany would be defeated by the summer of 1945 and he told the Commons that "we must look to the termination of the war against Nazism as a pointer which will fix the date of the next general election".

In a speech to the Conservative Party Conference in London on 15 March, with victory then imminent in the European theatre of operations, Churchill stated that if it “should fall to him to do so” to form a new government before the election he would form a government of “a national character” rather than a purely Conservative one. Replying to Henry Page Croft’s congratulations for that speech on 17 March, he stated that he was not aiming to form “a National Government” based on a formal cross-party agreement but rather on informal agreements with individuals, designed to make Labour look isolated and extreme. (Note: a Big tent strategy in modern parlance)

In early April 1945, Churchill met his deputy prime minister Clement Attlee, who was the leader of the Labour party, to discuss the future of the coalition. Attlee was due to depart for America on 17 April to attend the San Francisco Conference on the creation of the United Nations. Travelling with him were ministers Anthony Eden, Florence Horsbrugh and Ellen Wilkinson. They would be out of the country until 16 May and Churchill assured Attlee that Parliament would not be dissolved in their absence. After VE Day on 8 May, Churchill changed his mind about an early election and decided to propose continuation of the coalition until after the defeat of Japan.

In the meantime, however, Labour's Herbert Morrison, home secretary in the coalition, had published a declaration called Let Us Face The Future which was effectively a party manifesto for the election. Several leading Conservatives made speeches in response. The electioneering may have been premature and it subsided after the death of Hitler on 30 April but quickly regathered pace after VE Day. On 11 May, Churchill met Morrison and Ernest Bevin, the coalition's minister of labour, telling them that he wished to maintain the coalition until Japan had been defeated. Their view, confirmed by Labour's National Executive Committee (NEC), was that the general election should be held in October regardless of the situation in the Far East as it was then widely thought the war against Japan might continue for another 18 months. With Labour refusing to extend the coalition beyond October, Churchill began receiving calls from his own party to announce an election in June or July – leading Conservatives like Lord Beaverbrook and Brendan Bracken wanted to cash in on Churchill's personal popularity as "the man who won the war". Labour, on the other hand, wanted Churchill's popularity to subside and, in addition, Morrison pointed out that a new and more accurate register of voters would be available by October.

Attlee and Eden returned from America on 16 May and Attlee met Churchill that evening. While Attlee himself favoured continuation until the defeat of Japan, he was aware that the majority of Labour Party members thought differently. Churchill sought a compromise and wrote a letter to the Labour National Executive Committee which was amended by Bevin to include a pledge on social reform, but it was not enough. On Sunday, 20 May, the NEC voted for an October election and their resolution was backed overwhelmingly by the conference delegates next day. Attlee phoned Churchill with the news and an element of discord arose between the two which was fuelled by Beaverbrook in his newspapers.

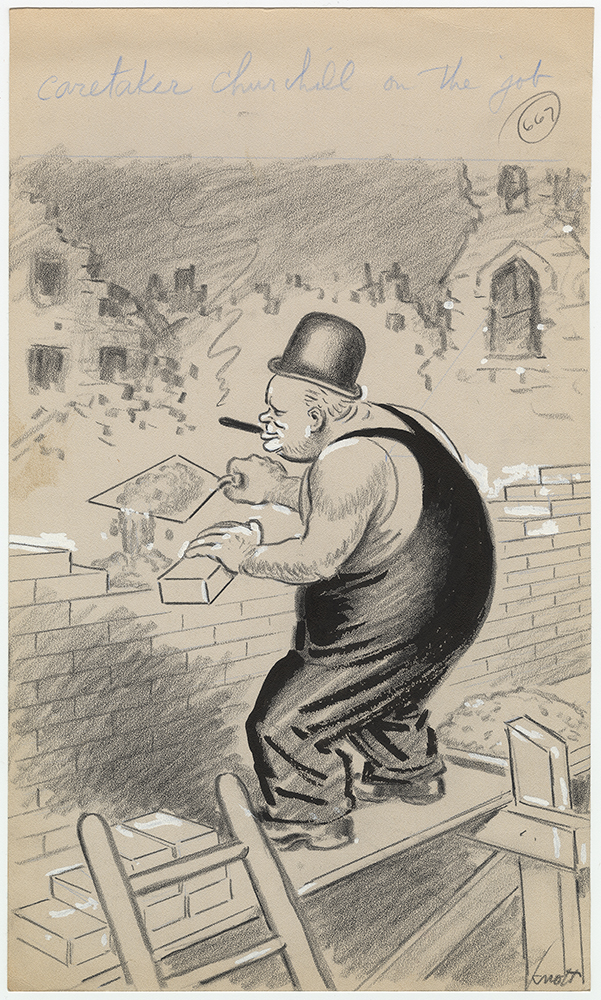
Contemporary cartoon by John F. Knott for The Dallas Morning News. It depicts Churchill as the "caretaker on the job" – in reality, Churchill was a keen amateur bricklayer.

At noon on Wednesday, 23 May, Churchill tendered his resignation to King George VI. He insisted on returning to Downing Street to keep up the pretence that the King had a free choice as to whom to invite to form the next government. He was summoned back to Buckingham Palace at four o'clock and the King asked him to form a new ministry pending the outcome of the general election. Churchill accepted. It was agreed that Parliament would be dissolved on 15 June and the election would be held on 5 July. With many service personnel out of the country, it was decided that votes would not be counted until 26 July, allowing time to collect the service votes.

== Formation of the caretaker government ==
Churchill's new government was known officially as the National Government, and unofficially as the Caretaker Ministry. The official title implied a continuation of the Conservative-dominated coalition of the 1930s, especially as it was composed mostly of Conservatives, supplemented by the small Liberal National party and some other individuals like Sir John Anderson who had been associated with that government. Churchill had completed his Cabinet appointments by the morning of 26 May, and drove with his wife Clementine to his Woodford constituency where he gave his first speech of the election campaign. In that speech he commented on the "caretaker" nickname, saying: "They call us 'the Caretakers'; we condone the title, because it means that we shall take every good care of everything that affects the welfare of Britain and all classes in Britain". Churchill was formally reappointed prime minister by the King on 28 May.

The Labour and Liberal parties formed the Opposition, except that one Liberal member, Gwilym Lloyd George, accepted Churchill's invitation to continue as Minister of Fuel and Power, the office he had held since 3 June 1942. While Churchill was obliged to replace all the other Labour and Liberal ministers in the coalition, he made no significant changes to the structure of the government. There were just two new posts: a Parliamentary secretary (Peter Thorneycroft) was appointed to the Ministry of War Transport, and there was an additional Parliamentary Under-Secretary of State for Foreign Affairs—Lord Lovat was appointed to share the role with future prime minister Lord Dunglass.

The vestigial National Labour Organisation was dissolved in June 1945, its five remaining MPs chose to use the 'National' label instead. Churchill went out of his way to attract non-Conservatives to join his government. Gwillym Lloyd George stood in the election “as a Liberal candidate supporting the National Government”. Leslie Hore-Belisha (a former Liberal National) stood and lost as a “National” candidate.

== Domestic events and policies ==
Pending the general election, Parliament sat on only fourteen days from 29 May to 15 June during the caretaker ministry. There was some controversy on Thursday, 7 June, when Churchill refused a demand from the House of Commons to reveal all that was discussed at the Yalta Conference, but said that there were no secret agreements. A total of 27 Acts received the Royal Assent on 15 June immediately prior to the Prorogation of Parliament. (Note: As confirmed by Hansard.) They all enacted legislation proposed and debated during the term of the wartime ministry, among them the Family Allowances Act 1945 which came into effect on 6 August 1946. This Act is important as the first UK law to provide child benefit and it is seen as a tribute to the work done over thirty years by Eleanor Rathbone who championed the family allowance cause. (Note: In his closing speech to Parliament, the King said that "legislation has been passed to provide for a scheme of family allowances, in which the families of serving men will be included".)

The government was actively involved in monitoring levels of rationing. Key to this was the Ministry of Food under John Llewellin and his parliamentary secretary, Florence Horsbrugh. A number of changes were actioned on 27 May, three weeks after VE Day, including cuts in the bacon ration from 4oz to 3oz per week, in the cooking fat ration from 2oz to 1oz, and a one-eighth cut in the soap ration, except for babies and young children. Petrol consumption had been restricted to military and industrial use on 1 July 1942, but the basic petrol ration for civilians was restored on 1 June 1945, though very few people owned private cars at that time. There was otherwise very little change: most food products continued to be rationed as during the war, and clothing until 1949, with the Utility Clothing Scheme continuing under its "Make Do and Mend" ethos.

There was little opportunity within such a short Parliament, and with an election campaign underway, for any effective measures to be brought forward by the caretaker ministry and so, for the most part, they kept a watching brief while trying to convince the electorate that they would get down to the real business after the election. With this in mind, a cornerstone of Churchill's manifesto was implementation of the coalition government's Four-Year Plan. According to Martin Gilbert, Churchill was influenced in this by the views of his daughter Sarah. The Four-Year Plan had been prepared two years earlier by William Beveridge and called for the creation of a National Health Service (NHS) and an extension of the welfare state. These measures were also part of the Labour manifesto and Churchill, encouraged by Sarah and others, decided to go further by promising free milk for the under-fives and a housing programme to ensure "homes for all". (Note: The housing shortage was still the primary domestic issue when Churchill formed his third ministry in 1951 and future prime minister Harold Macmillan was appointed Minister of Housing and Local Government with a commitment to build 300,000 new houses per annum, a target he achieved.)

On 3 July, three days before polling day, Churchill sent the Cabinet a memorandum urging them to make “an intensive effort” between polling day and the results on 26 July, to make plans to use demobilised men to build houses, and to draw up plans to increase exports and coal production, and legislation for “National Insurance” and “a National Health Service” as a priority. His efforts in these areas were unknown to the electorate.

The caretaker ministry's short term of office means that a critical assessment of its performance is difficult but Stuart Ball credits Churchill as "a good constructor of cabinets" and says that, although the 1945 government is sometimes unfairly dismissed, "it was a sound and capable team". Gilbert points out that the ministry's efforts were overshadowed by the general election in which Churchill himself was the focus of public interest.

== International events ==
=== Continuing the war against Japan ===
The war against Japan continued for the duration of the caretaker ministry. Even before the defeat of Germany, Churchill had told the Americans that he wanted the Royal Navy to play a prominent role in the defeat of Japan and the liberation of Britain's Asian colonies, especially Singapore. The Americans were unenthusiastic, suspecting that Churchill's intentions were primarily imperialist. Neither Franklin Roosevelt nor Harry Truman had any intention of helping to sustain the British Empire. In their successful campaigns of 1944 and the early months of 1945, the British Army and its allies had mostly cleared Burma of Japanese forces by May 1945. Rangoon had fallen to the Allies on 2 May following the Battle of Elephant Point.

The Battle of Okinawa (1 April until 22 June) raged throughout the time period of this government, with the fierce Japanese resistance boding ill for the Allied invasion of Japan scheduled for the end of 1945, and in which the British hoped to play a role. The Pacific War would end sooner than expected after the atomic attack on Hiroshima (6 August), the Soviet invasion of Manchuria (8 August) as agreed with the western Allies at the Yalta Conference, and the atomic attack on Nagasaki (9 August). Japan surrendered on 15 August, three weeks after Churchill's resignation. While Churchill had hoped for a triumphant re-entry to Singapore, its recovery was logistically difficult and it would remain under Japanese control until 12 September when it was finally recovered, following the Japanese surrender, by British forces in Operation Tiderace.

=== Trieste and Istria ===
Trieste and Istria was the main ongoing problem as the European war ended. On 15 May Churchill, with President Truman’s approval, had telegraphed Stalin stating that Tito’s Yugoslav Partisans must not be allowed to occupy the whole of Istria, whose future must not be decided by military conquest. Churchill also telegraphed Field Marshal Alexander, Supreme Commander in the Mediterranean, that day that he was concerned at Alexander’s recent worries about the low morale of his forces, including US troops. He had told Alexander that he had obtained a “magnificent” message of support from Truman on 12 May and that Trieste and Istria would be a flashpoint for the western Allies standing up to Soviet-backed incursion. Alexander had replied, the same day, that his troops would obey orders but without the same enthusiasm with which they had fought “the hated Germans”. Churchill had forwarded the message on to Eden, who was then in San Francisco negotiating the foundation of the United Nations, commenting that in Greece British troops had “soon warm[ed] up” when sent into action in similar circumstances (he was referring to the Dekemvriana in December 1944 when British troops had prevented ELAS guerrillas from seizing Athens, so as to ensure the setting-up of a pro-British monarchist regime in Greece).

On 11 June Tito agreed to remain behind the line laid down by Field Marshal Alexander and to vacate the port of Pola at the tip of Istria; also on the same day the French agreed after strong British pressure to withdraw from North West Italy, which they appeared to have been contemplating annexing. (Note: The article on the Aosta Valley Crisis mentions that President Truman also applied strong pressure)

The Istria issue would eventually be resolved at the peace treaty in 1947 which also set up the short-lived Free Territory of Trieste.

=== Relations with the United States ===
President Truman, after initially being tough with the Soviets over Trieste and having a terse meeting with Molotov, had reverted to Roosevelt’s policy of keeping a certain distance from Britain and maintaining relations with the Soviets, sending Harry Hopkins on a mission to Moscow and Joseph E. Davies to London. Hopkins had six conversations with Stalin between 26 May and 6 June. He said that the US wanted a Poland “friendly” to, but not completely controlled by, the USSR. Apparent progress was made regarding involvement of non Lublin Poles in the pro-Soviet Polish Government (the "Lublin Poles") and the issue of how Security Council vetoes should work at the new United Nations. Stalin favoured a Three Power (UK-US-USSR) peace conference (which would become the Potsdam Conference). Stalin made the offer to Churchill on 27 May and Churchill accepted two days later. Stalin told Hopkins (31 May) that “Churchill had misled the Americans” and wanted Britain to “control” Poland.

On 26 May Churchill met Davies after dinner and they talked until 3.45am. To Churchill’s dismay Davies, who was pro Soviet, suggested that there should be a prior Truman-Stalin summit meeting before Britain was invited to join the talks. Historian John Charmley describes these as the “most unsettling” talks Churchill ever had with an American. According to Davies own account Churchill launched a fierce attack on the Soviets, and Tito and de Gaulle for their ingratitude. Davies also claimed that Churchill was opposed to the policy of Unconditional Surrender and would have preferred to have allowed Germany to make a negotiated peace. Davies claimed to have told Churchill that his compromise peace stance was similar to the proposals with which Hitler and Joseph Goebbels had sought to split the Allies. Truman did not want to leave US troops in Europe.

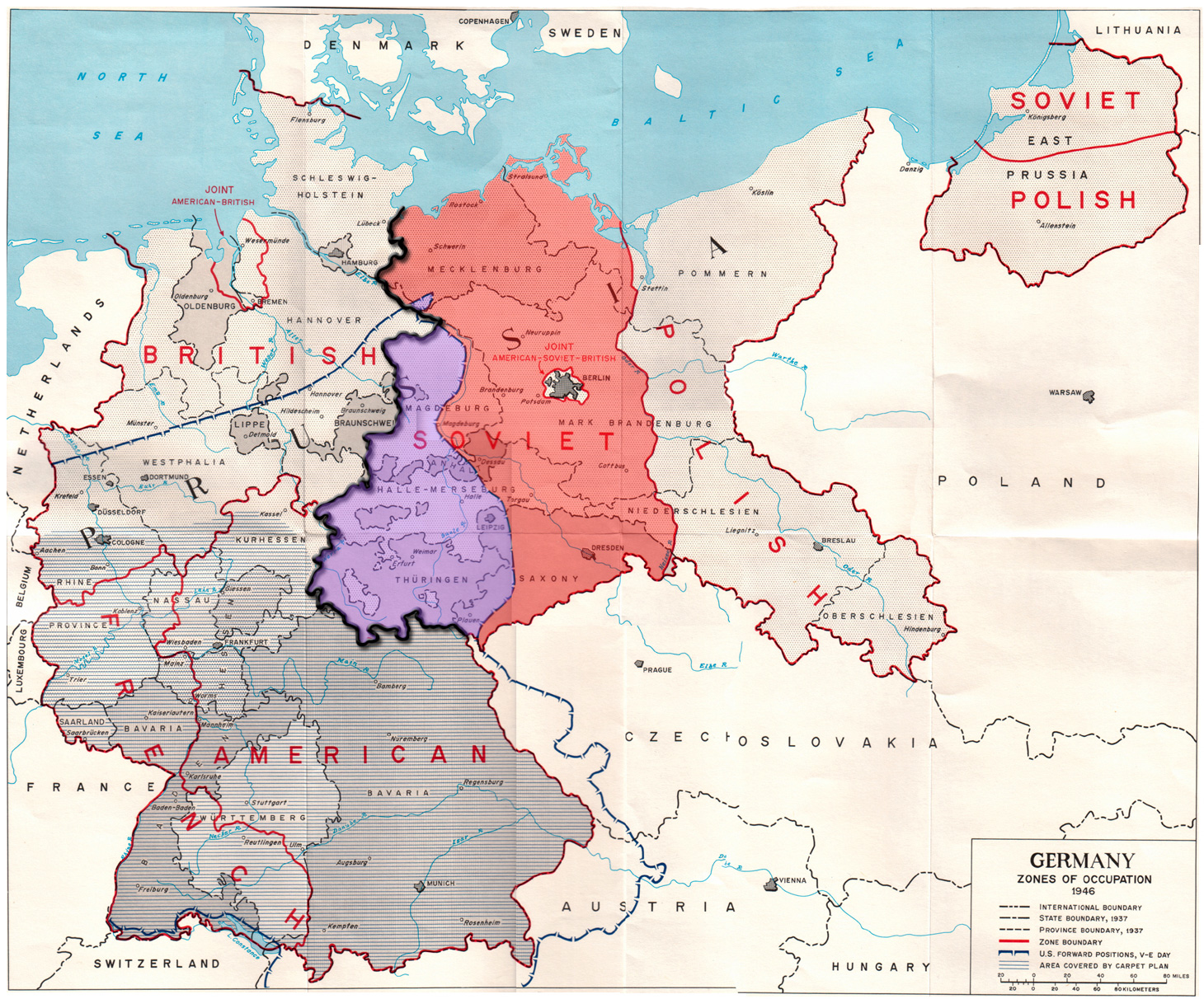
The area occupied by Soviet troops (red) after the German surrender, and the zone from which British and US troops withdrew in July 1945 (purple). The red and purple areas became the Soviet Zone of Occupation and eventually postwar East Germany. The provincial boundaries are those of pre-Nazi Weimar Germany, before the present Länder were established.

Churchill met Davies again before lunch on 27 May. According to Churchill's account in his war memoirs he strongly rejected any idea that any disagreements were solely between Britain and Russia. Asked on 28 May whether Davies should be allowed to see "Bevin & Co" Churchill ordered: “certainly not, repeat not (both italics in original), nor anyone else”. In a note of the conversation written for Eden on 28 May Churchill stated that there was “no equality between right and wrong” and that he could not “readily bring himself to accept the idea” of US equidistance between Britain and the USSR. Davies was worried about Churchill’s state of mind, especially about Poland which Churchill regarded as a “matter of honour” because she had been the reason for Britain going to war in 1939. Charmley regards Churchill's position as typical of his lack of realism about Anglo-American friendship.

In his war memoirs Churchill reproduced his draft note of the Davies talks which he claimed to have sent to Truman, but in fact he did not do so. (Note: The sixth volume of Churchill's War Memoirs appeared after his return to office in the 1950s and was almost entirely ghostwritten (see The Second World War (book series)) The error was therefore by Churchill's writing team.) On 29 May Churchill accepted Stalin’s offer of Three Power talks. On the same day he urged the British chiefs of staff not to be too hasty in demobilising. Also on 29 May Churchill sent a telegram to Truman opposing the proposed prior US-Soviet bilateral, stating that he would have preferred London for Stalin's proposed Three Power Summit but accepting Potsdam as a location. In a second telegram (31 May) he claimed to have had “agreeable talks” with Davies. This was a white lie as he disliked Davies; he told others that “after his talk with Davies he needed a bath to get rid of the ooze and the slime”.(R. H. Bruce Lockhart Diary 3 June).

On 4 June Churchill telegraphed Truman objecting to US troops withdrawing, before a final peace settlement had been agreed, from Czechoslovakia and from the River Elbe (which, for operational clarity, had been the agreed boundary between western troops and the Red Army during the collapse of Germany) and out of the Soviet Zone (which would eventually form postwar East Germany). US troop withdrawals from eastern Germany and Czechoslovakia began on 20 June.

=== Levant Crisis ===
Syria had become a French mandate after the defeat of the Ottoman Empire in the First World War, and in 1936 signed a treaty by which she became independent while remaining a French client state. After the fall of France in 1940, Syria had come under the control of Vichy France until the British and Free French occupied the country in the Syria–Lebanon campaign in July 1941 to prevent it being used as a German foothold in the Middle East.

On 31 May, Churchill and Eden intervened in the Levant Crisis which had been initiated by French General Charles de Gaulle. Acting as head of the French Provisional Government, de Gaulle had ordered French forces to establish an air base in Syria and a naval base in Lebanon. The action provoked a nationalist outbreak in both countries and France responded with armed retaliation, leading to many civilian deaths. French shelling on 29-30 May killed 400 civilians.

With the situation escalating out of control, Churchill gave de Gaulle an ultimatum to desist (31 May). This was ignored and on 1 June British forces from neighbouring Transjordan were mobilised to restore order. The French, heavily outnumbered, had no option but to return to their bases. A diplomatic row broke out and Churchill reportedly told a colleague that de Gaulle was "a great danger to peace and for Great Britain".

On 5 June Churchill had to answer a Private Members Question in the House of Commons on Syria.

== The Election Campaign ==
=== Background ===
The Conservative Party withered during the war and Churchill’s speeches to the Party Conference in 1941 and 1942 had been lacklustre.

By early 1943 (after the Second Battle of El Alamein, the Torch landings, the Casablanca Conference and the Battle of Stalingrad) the Allies were clearly winning the war and public opinion began to shift towards an interest in post war planning, especially after the publication of the Beveridge Report in November 1942. Churchill thought Beveridge “an awful windbag and a dreamer” and the Beveridge Report too costly to implement in full. In February 1943 a major House of Commons rebellion by Labour MPs demanded full implementation of the Beveridge Report.

Churchill gave a broadcast speech on the Government’s Four Years Plan (21 March 1943). The speech floated the possibility that he might remain as Prime Minister after the war, and was a rare example of him speaking about post war plans. Churchill, still preoccupied with war matters, dictated the draft during a car journey. His secretary’s notes were illegible so she reconstructed the speech by consulting his adviser Lord Cherwell and his police bodyguard Commander Thompson, Churchill complained that the speech was not what he had dictated but “at least the words made sense”. The speech went through another three weeks of drafting, which included contributions by the economist Lord Keynes. The War Cabinet approved the speech in advance and Herbert Morrison obtained a commitment to legislative planning before the end of the war and stating that there was room for greater state ownership, especially of monopolies. (Note: Labour's postwar nationalisations of electricity, rail, coalmines and the Bank of England would prove relatively uncontroversial at the time) This was Churchill’s only major speech on postwar planning – to some extent he was avoiding any immediate commitment but it later formed the basis of his 1945 manifesto. The speech claimed that William Beveridge had been a “friend” since, as President of the Board of Trade (1908-10), Churchill had enlisted his help in setting up Labour Exchanges. In discussing the plans to provide free milk for the under-fives, it contained the memorable line that “there is no finer investment for any community than putting milk into babies”.

Opinion polling started in June 1943 and showed Labour in a consistent lead, which they would maintain until 1945. As early as August 1943 Mass Observation surveys found that although Churchill was widely respected, around a third of people thought he would be a poor peace leader.

People disliked and were suspicious of the Conservative Party, whose "National" coalition was perceived as having presided over poverty and mass unemployment in the 1930s, and to have appeased German and Italian aggression. In the runup to and during the election Labour ran a very effective campaign which focused on the peacetime issues foremost in the minds of the voters and which Labour were trusted to resolve: full employment, improved housing and the provision of free medical services. Robert Blake wrote that, by contrast, the Tory message, which made similar promises, “did not lack content, but it lacked credibility”. Churchill’s 1945 manifesto, Mr. Churchill's Declaration to the Voters, did not specifically endorse any party. It began by stating that he had formed "a new National Government". (Note: amongst other pledges the manifesto promised to "introduce legislation … in the new Parliament … [to make healthcare] available to all citizens. Everyone will contribute to the cost, and no one will be denied the [treatment] he requires because he cannot afford [it]. We propose to create a comprehensive health service covering the whole range of medical treatment.") Churchill was very keen to distance himself from the unpopular Conservative Party and to appeal to Liberal voters. However, his attempt to do so in his "Gestapo" Speech, by stressing Labour’s supposed threat to civil liberties, would backfire badly. His use of the “National” title also backfired as Labour had always treated the name as a fraud in the 1930s and it was particularly discredited after the war coalition had been formed in 1940.

=== The Gestapo Speech ===
Churchill mishandled the election campaign by his partisan attacks on the Labour Party. He committed a serious political gaffe in a broadcast on 4 June by saying in a radio broadcast that a Labour government would require "some form of Gestapo" to enforce its agenda: Churchill's ill-judged phrase may, in the view of Richard Toye, have been inspired by an old speech which he had given on 14 April 1905. Churchill, who had then recently defected from the Conservatives to the Liberals, had accused his old party of wanting to bring in US-style tariffs, a German military system (the Balfour Government had been reforming the Army, whereas the Liberals were initially committed to military retrenchment) and an Aliens Act enforced by a Tsarist-style Okhrana.

"The Times" reported Churchill’s message in the speech as “VOTE NATIONAL – NOT PARTY”. Churchill spoke at length about how he and his government were “Conservative and National” (he stood under that label in his own seat at Woodford). He was particularly critical of the Liberals, his own former party, for not joining his government. His criticism of Labour and the Liberals’ refusal to serve in his new government was a deliberate echo of Stanley Baldwin’s claim during the 1931 General Election that the Labour ministers had run away from their responsibilities rather than join the National Government, while his criticism of Labour's plans to nationalise the Bank of England (which in the event would prove relatively uncontroversial) were an attempt to repeat the 1931 scare that Labour would nationalise or even confiscate people's Post Office Savings.

However, in a passage which became notorious, he declared:

No Socialist Government conducting the entire life and industry of the country could afford to allow free, sharp, or violently-worded expressions of public discontent. They would have to fall back on some form of Gestapo, no doubt very humanely directed in the first instance.

Gilbert describes the speech's references to socialism as "hostile and injudicious", and it backfired badly. Labour reacted to the broadcast with ridicule rather than outrage. Herbert Morrison called it “Churchill’s Crazy Broadcast” (article in 5 June Daily Herald). Attlee made political capital by saying in his reply broadcast on 5 June: "The voice we heard last night was that of Mr Churchill, but the mind was that of Lord Beaverbrook". Roy Jenkins says this broadcast was "the making of Attlee". Attlee claimed that the speech had been inspired by The Road to Serfdom which he dismissed as “theoretical stuff” by “an Austrian professor Friedrich August von Hayek” (subtly stressing his foreign origins). Attlee observed that left-wing governments had been elected in Scandinavia, Australia and New Zealand without causing tyranny. His contrast of Churchill the great war leader with Churchill the partisan party leader was a deliberate rebuttal of Churchill’s attempt to wrap himself in the “National” label, and after the election was the subject of a famous cartoon by Low. (Note: the cartoon shows a happy Churchill on a pedestal labelled "The Leader of Humanity", enjoying newspapers labelled "world opinion" and looking down on a disgruntled Churchill "party leader" in a civilian suit, with the caption: "Cheer Up! They will forget you, but they will remember me always!" A copy can be seen in Robert Blake's 1985 history of the Conservative party.)

Richard Toye wrote in 2010 that the Gestapo speech had retained all of the notoriety it gained at the time of delivery. Labour’s rhetoric was often just as extreme - the Labour Party Speaker’s Handbook actively encouraged speakers to link the Tories to fascism and appeasement. However, Churchill’s gaffe made it hard for the Conservatives to take the moral high ground or to reply in kind. A Leeds shopkeeper told Mass Observation that Churchill’s speech was like listening to the soapbox oratory of forty years previously. A national leader was expected to behave differently from a party leader during an election and Churchill failed to strike the right balance, causing him to lose credibility.

Many of Churchill's colleagues and supporters were appalled by the speech, including Leo Amery who praised Attlee's "adroit reply to Winston's rhodomontade". Harold Macmillan tactfully wrote to Churchill (8 June) calling the anti-Labour message “splendid” but urging him to direct his subsequent broadcasts to “the floating (and non-party) vote”. The Gestapo speech was well liked in the USA but caused anger in Australia and New Zealand.

The Liberal Lord Samuel (9 June), apparently echoing the previous comments by Labour’s Herbert Morrison, claimed that the Conservatives, like the Nazis and Italian Fascists, were claiming the right to rule in perpetuity. AV Alexander (12 June) mentioned that housewives in the 1930s had been tormented by “the Gestapo of the Means Test”.

=== Later campaign ===
Although the Gestapo speech created a negative response, Churchill personally retained a very high approval rating in opinion polls and was still expected to win the election. Although the Conservative Party was unpopular, many electors appear to have wanted Churchill to continue as prime minister whatever the outcome, or to have wrongly believed this would be possible.

Churchill's second broadcast (13 June) briefly mentioned the Government's Four Year Plan, and Churchill mentioned that he was the “oldest living champion of National Insurance” in the House of Commons and mentioned his “friend” David Lloyd George who had died a few months earlier. Churchill had stressed to his colleagues that a Conservative government must be constructive, and he announced his commitment to addressing the housing shortage broadcast in the 13 June broadcast but, as with the Gestapo speech on 4 June, he ruined the effect by again insisting that Labour would deploy some form of "political police" to control the nation.

Stafford Cripps, speaking in Glasgow (16 June), criticised the Cult of Personality of Churchill’s campaign: he drew attention to Churchill’s failure to mention the word “Conservative” in his manifesto and stated that he had seen a candidate in Cumberland describe himself as a “Churchill candidate”. Philip Noel-Baker argued in an official Labour broadcast (17 June) that the Tories had aided Germany by allowing her to rearm with the 1935 Anglo-German Naval Agreement.

Churchill's third broadcast (21 June) discussed the issue of Harold Laski, who had claimed, to Attlee's irritation, that as chairman of the Labour party organisation he could dictate to an elected Labour Government. Some Conservative candidates talked of “Gauleiter Laski”. Churchill's fourth broadcast (30 June) expressed his relief that this “strange, unnatural election”, which had set recent colleagues against one another, was “now, to everybody’s relief, drawing to its close”. He was still referring to his government as “the National Government” in the draft of that broadcast. When he addressed an audience in the Labour stronghold of Walthamstow on the evening of 3 July, he was almost forced to abandon the event because of booing and heckling.

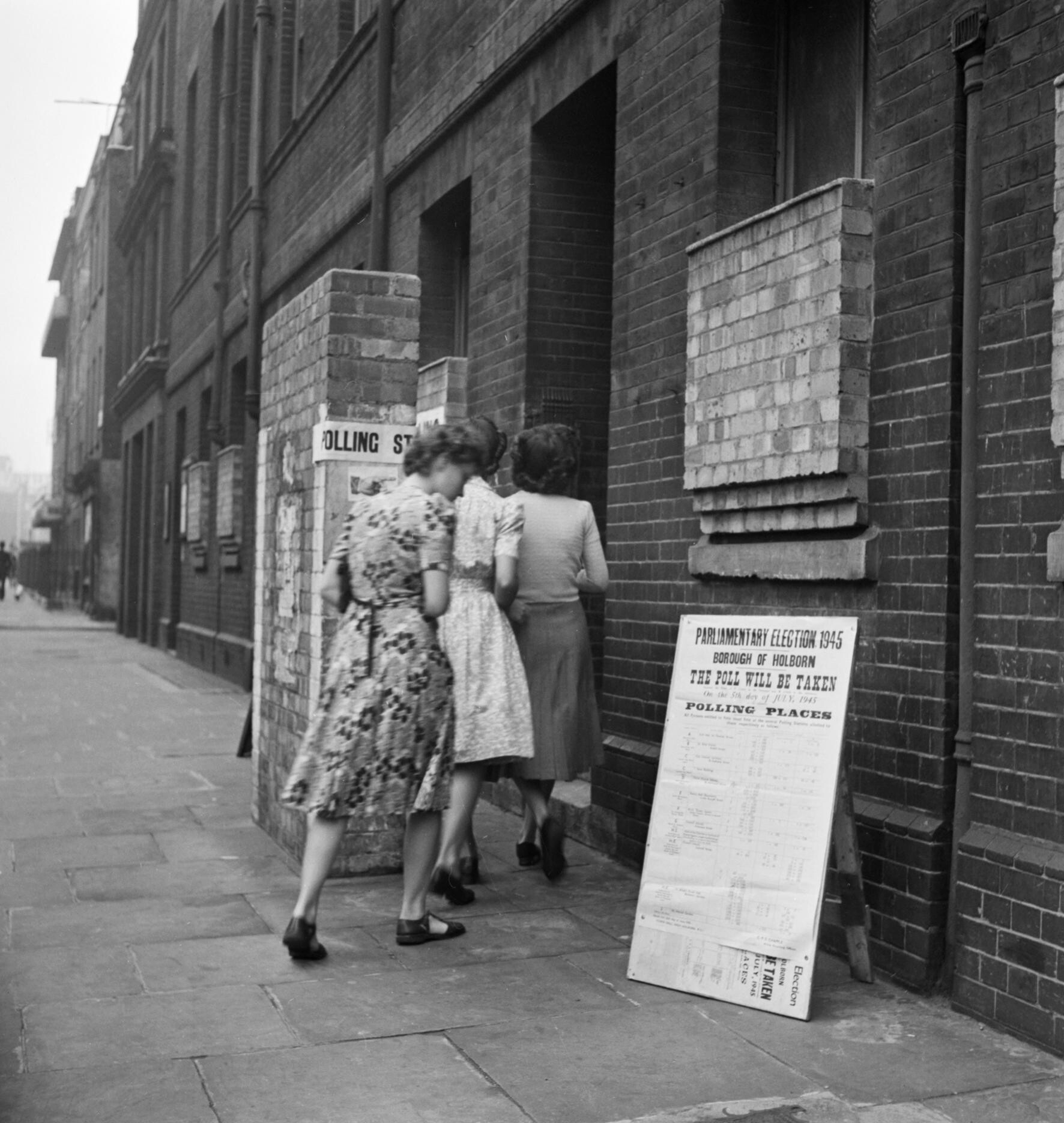
Voters in Holborn arriving at their polling station.

Many commentators felt that Churchill's election speeches lacked "vim" and there is a view that he was much more interested in what was happening in eastern Europe, his primary concern at Yalta and Potsdam, than in Great Britain. Vita Sackville-West wrote to her husband Harold Nicolson (22 June) that, as an admirer of Churchill, she was “dreadfully distressed by the badness” of his speeches which were “confused, woolly, unconstructive and so wordy” that they would put off “wobbler” voters. Churchill’s doctor Lord Moran later claimed in his controversial memoirs that Churchill had told him in the middle of the campaign that “I am worried about this damned election. I have no message for them”.

Polling day was on 5 July, with the count delayed, as agreed, for three weeks for collection of the overseas service votes.

== Potsdam Conference ==
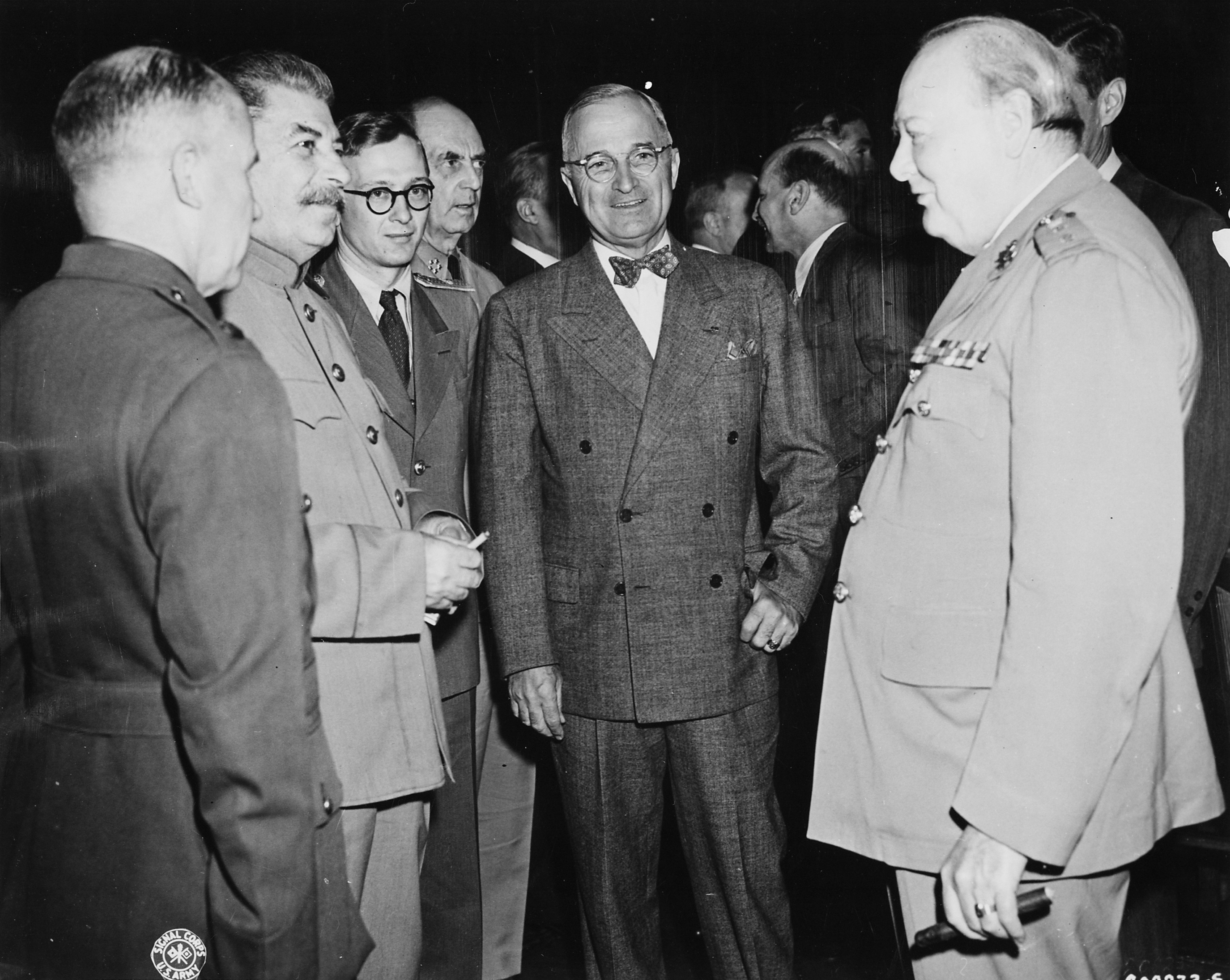
Churchill at the Potsdam Conference, July 1945, with Stalin (second left) and Truman (centre). Admiral Leahy is fourth left.

Churchill was Great Britain's representative at the post-war Potsdam Conference when it opened on 17 July. It was a "Big Three" event with Joseph Stalin representing the Soviet Union and President Harry Truman the United States. Ever since the conference was first proposed, Churchill had worried about the countries of eastern Europe, especially Poland, which had been overrun by the Red Army.

According to Eden, Churchill's performance at Potsdam was "appalling" because he was unprepared and verbose. Eden said Churchill upset the Chinese, exasperated the Americans and was easily led by Stalin, whom he was supposed to be resisting. This negative version of events is contradicted by Gilbert who describes Churchill's eager involvement in discussions with Stalin and Truman. Their main topics were the successful testing by the Americans of the atom bomb and the demarcation of a new frontier between Poland and East Germany. Stalin insisted on extending the frontier westward to the Oder and Western Neisse rivers, forming the Oder–Neisse line and thus incorporating most of Silesia into Poland. Churchill and Truman opposed this proposal but to no avail. Gilbert does recount that Field Marshal Montgomery was worried about Churchill's health, saying in a letter that Churchill had "put on ten years since I last saw him".

Churchill was accompanied at the sessions not only by Eden as Foreign Secretary but also by Attlee, pending the result of the general election which had been held on 5 July. They attended nine sessions in nine days before returning to England for their election counts. Churchill did not return to Potsdam after the landslide Labour victory, instead Attlee returned to lead the British delegation as Prime Minister with Ernest Bevin as the new Foreign Secretary and there were a further five days of discussion.

== Election result and resignation of Churchill ==
Churchill returned to London from Potsdam for the election results; he later recorded in his war memoirs that he went to bed on 25 July hoping to “reconstitute the National Coalition Government in the proportions of the new House of Commons” then awoke with a stabbing pain and a premonition that he had lost. Churchill's wife Clementine and his daughter Mary attended the count in Woodford on 26 July and returned to Downing Street to meet him for lunch. Churchill had been unopposed by the major parties in Woodford, but his majority over a sole independent candidate was much less than expected. With a Labour victory increasingly obvious, Mary later described the lunch as "an occasion of Stygian gloom". To Clementine's suggestion that defeat might be "a blessing in disguise", Churchill retorted: "At the moment it seems very effectively disguised".

The outcome was a landslide victory for the Labour Party with a Commons majority of 146 over all other parties. Moran later recorded that on the afternoon after the announcement of the results, he had commiserated with Churchill on the "ingratitude" of the British public, to which he replied "I wouldn't call it that. They have had a very hard time". Churchill wanted to exercise his constitutional right to remain in office until defeated by a no confidence vote in the House of Commons, partly so he could complete the Potsdam Conference as prime minister. Instead he was persuaded by Eden (on the telephone from his constituency at Warwick) to resign that evening, and was succeeded by Attlee.

== Cabinet ==
This table lists those ministers who held Cabinet membership in the caretaker ministry. Many retained roles they held in the war ministry and these are marked in situ with the date of their original appointment. For new appointments, their predecessor's name is given.

=== Ministers who held Cabinet membership, 23 May – 26 July 1945 ===
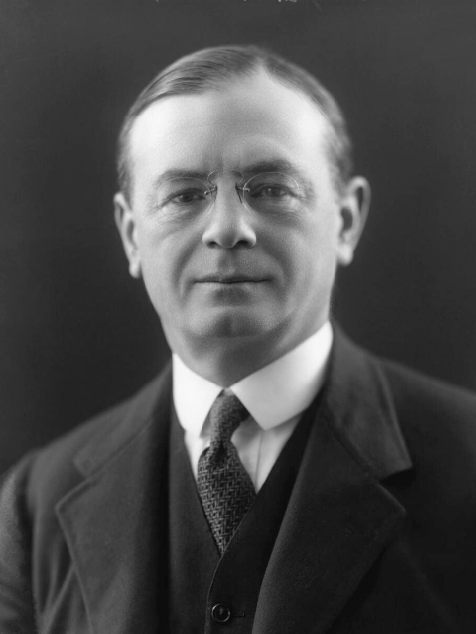
Leo Amery, Secretary of State for India and Burma

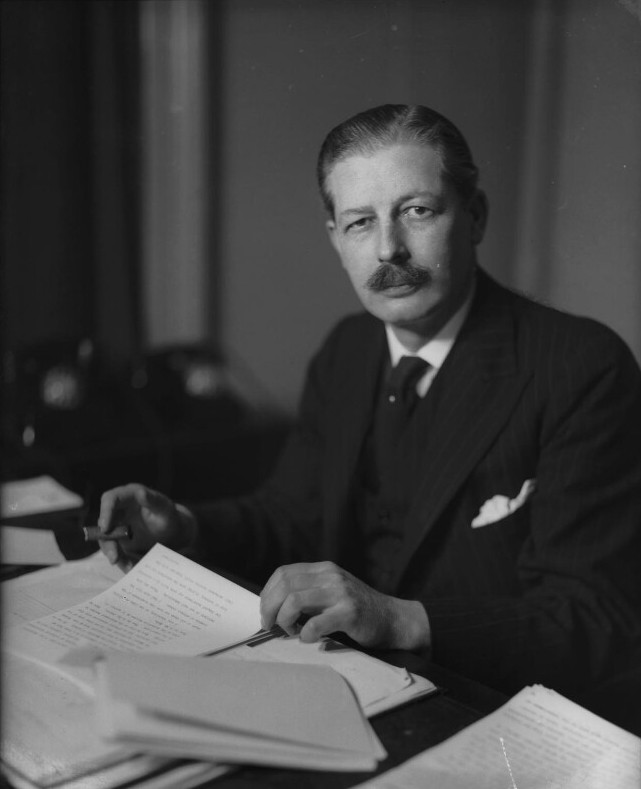
Harold Macmillan, Secretary of State for Air

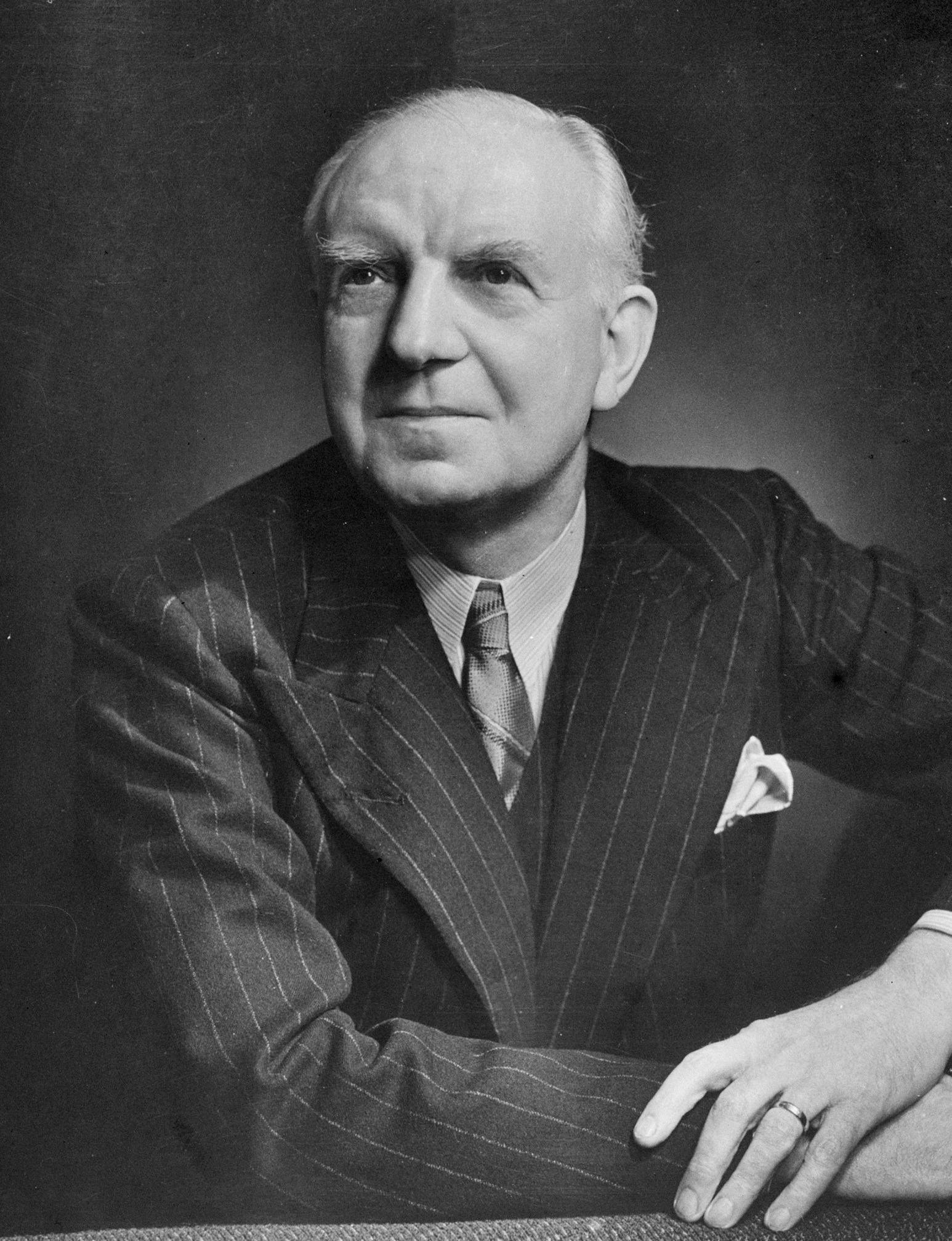
Lord Woolton, Lord President of the Council

Portfolio	Minister	Party	Notes and citations
Prime Minister and First Lord of the Treasury	Winston Churchill	Conservative	in situ – appointed 10 May 1940; Churchill was also the Minister of Defence
Lord President of the Council	Lord Woolton	Conservative	succeeded Clement Attlee; Woolton was previously Minister of Reconstruction
Lord Privy Seal	Lord Beaverbrook	Conservative	in situ – appointed 24 September 1943
Leader of the House of Lords	Viscount Cranborne	Conservative	in situ – appointed 21 February 1942; Cranborne was also Secretary of State for Dominion Affairs
Chancellor of the Exchequer	Sir John Anderson	National	in situ – appointed 24 September 1943
Foreign Secretary	Anthony Eden	Conservative	in situ – appointed 22 December 1940
Home Secretary	Donald Somervell	Conservative	succeeded Herbert Morrison; Somervell was previously Attorney General
First Lord of the Admiralty	Brendan Bracken	Conservative	succeeded A. V. Alexander; Bracken was previously Minister of Information
Minister of Agriculture, Fisheries and Food	Robert Hudson	Conservative	in situ – appointed 14 May 1940
Secretary of State for Air	Harold Macmillan	Conservative	succeeded Sir Archibald Sinclair; Macmillan was previously Minister-Resident in North-west Africa
Secretary of State for the Colonies	Oliver Stanley	Conservative	in situ – appointed 22 November 1942
Minister of Defence	Winston Churchill	Conservative	in situ – appointed 10 May 1940 in addition to becoming Prime Minister
Secretary of State for Dominion Affairs	Viscount Cranborne	Conservative	in situ – appointed 24 September 1943; Cranborne was also Leader of the House of Lords
Minister of Education	Richard Law	Conservative	succeeded Rab Butler; Law was previously Minister of State for Foreign Affairs
Secretary of State for India and Burma	Leo Amery	Conservative	in situ – appointed 13 May 1940
Minister of Labour and National Service	Rab Butler	Conservative	succeeded Ernest Bevin; Butler was previously Minister of Education
Minister of Production	Oliver Lyttelton	Conservative	in situ – appointed 12 March 1942; Lyttelton was also President of the Board of Trade
Secretary of State for Scotland	Earl of Rosebery	National Liberal	succeeded Tom Johnston; Rosebery was previously a Regional Commissioner for Civil Defence in Scotland
President of the Board of Trade	Oliver Lyttelton	Conservative	succeeded Hugh Dalton; Lyttelton was also Minister of Production
Secretary of State for War	Sir P. J. Grigg	National	in situ – appointed 22 February 1942

== Ministers outside the Cabinet ==
This table lists those ministers who held non-Cabinet roles in the caretaker ministry. Some retained roles they held in the war ministry and these are marked in situ with the date of their original appointment. For new appointments, their predecessor's name is given.

=== Government ministers who held offices without Cabinet membership, 23 May – 26 July 1945 ===
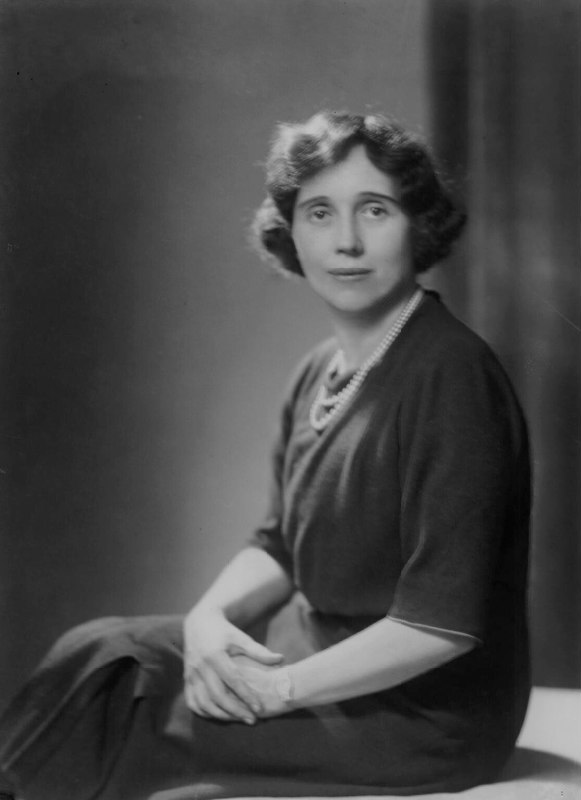
Thelma Cazalet-Keir, Parliamentary Secretary to the Ministry of Education

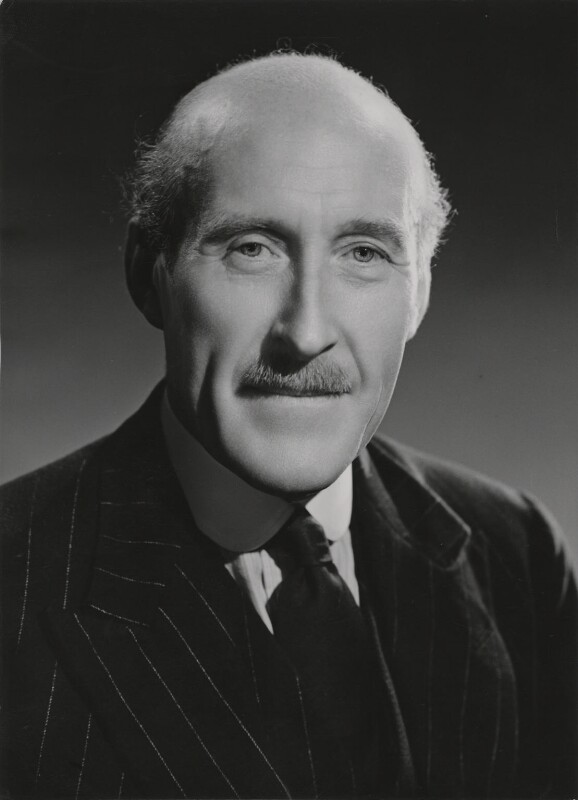
Harry Crookshank, Postmaster General

Sir Edward Grigg, Minister-Resident for the Middle East

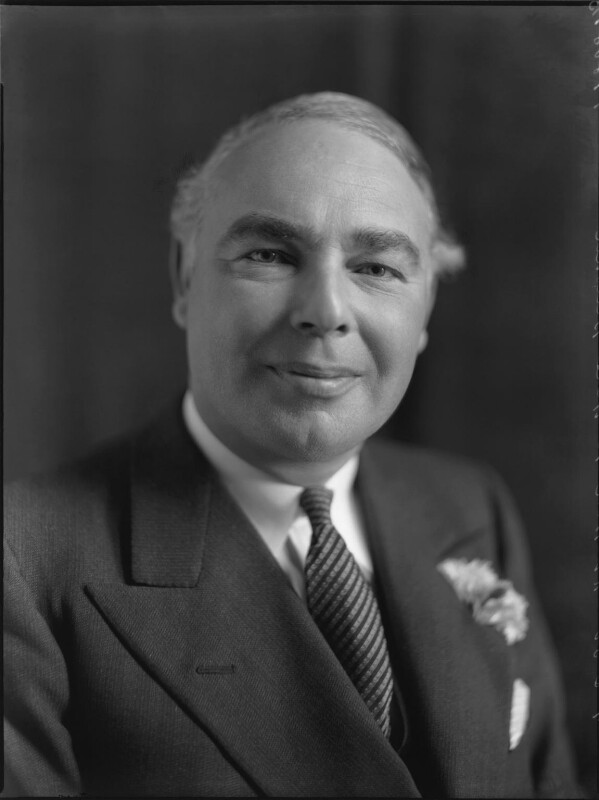
Leslie Hore-Belisha, Minister of National Insurance

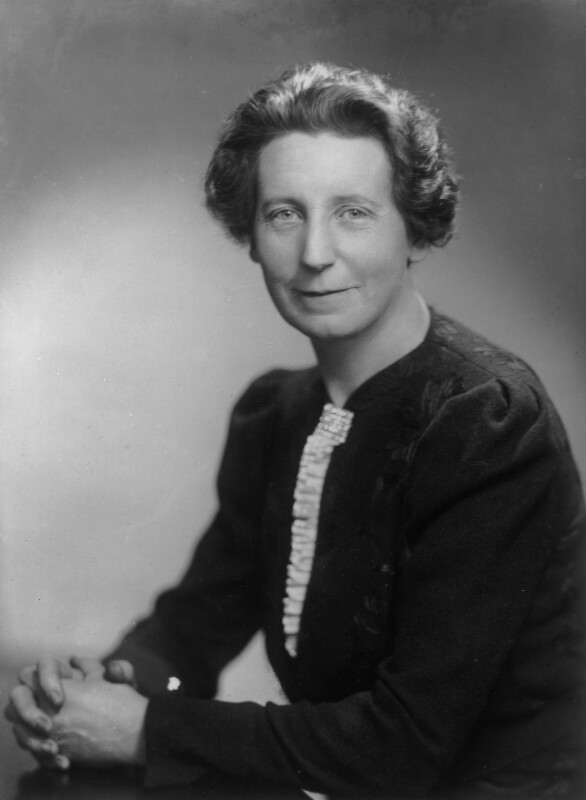
Florence Horsbrugh, Parliamentary Secretary to the Ministry of Food

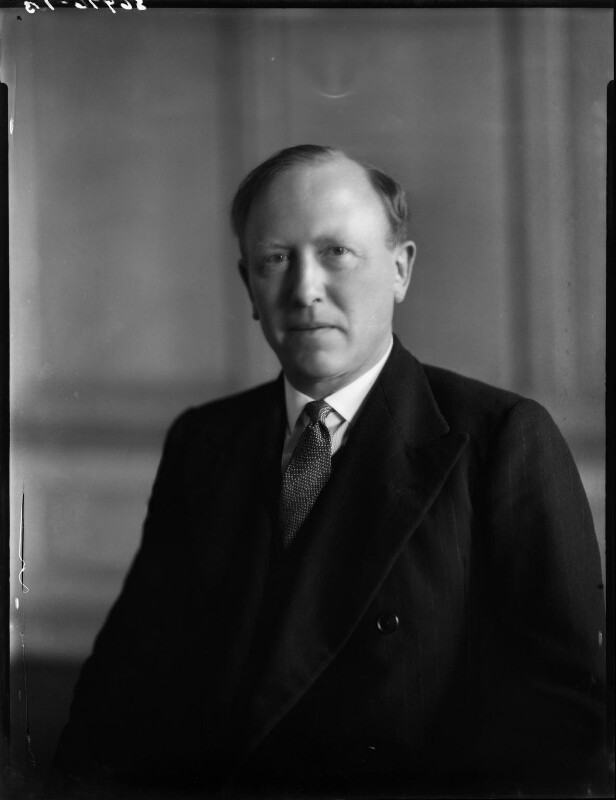
John Llewellin, Minister of Food

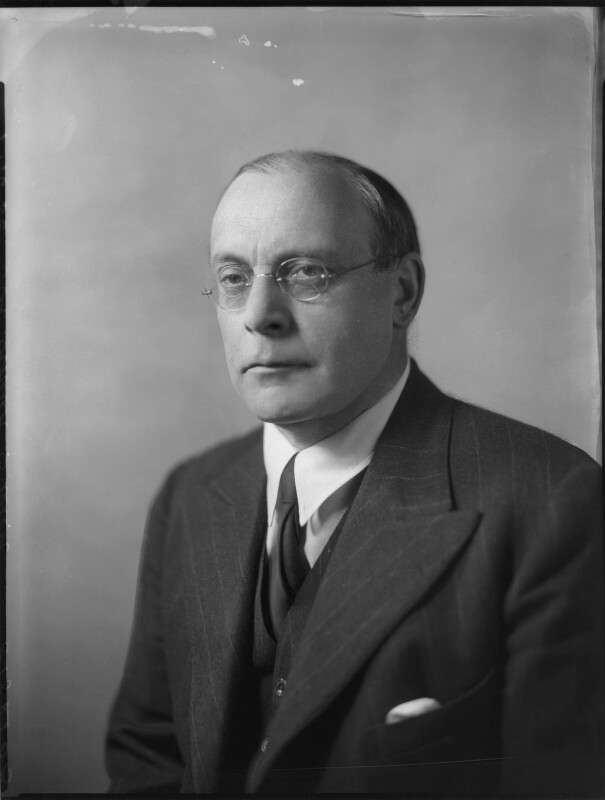
Sir Arthur Salter, Chancellor of the Duchy of Lancaster

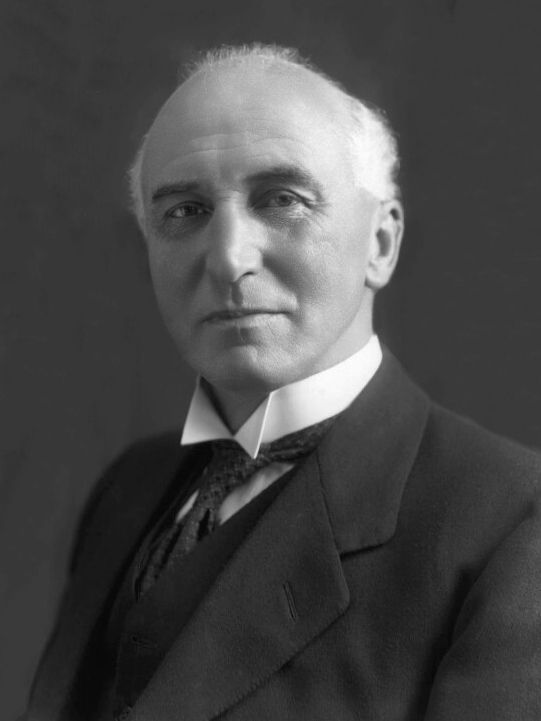
John Simon, 1st Viscount Simon, Lord Chancellor

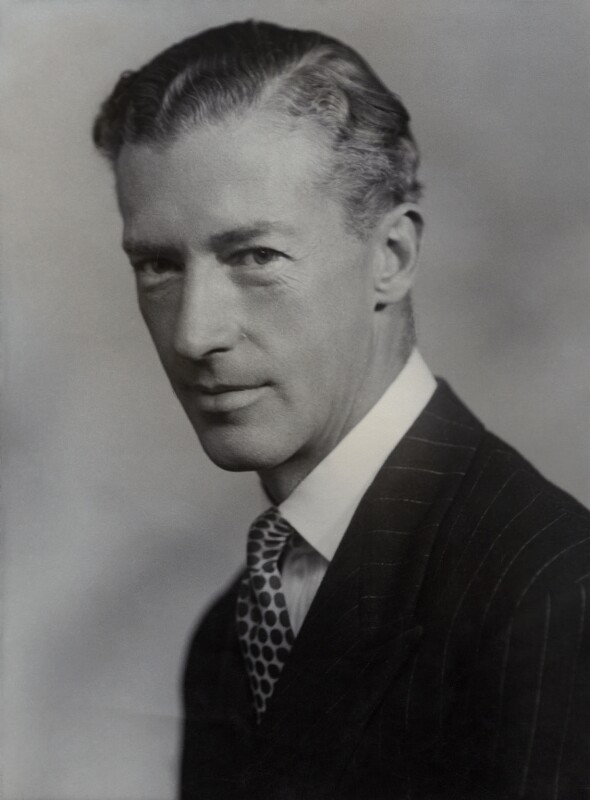
Spencer Summers, Secretary for Overseas Trade

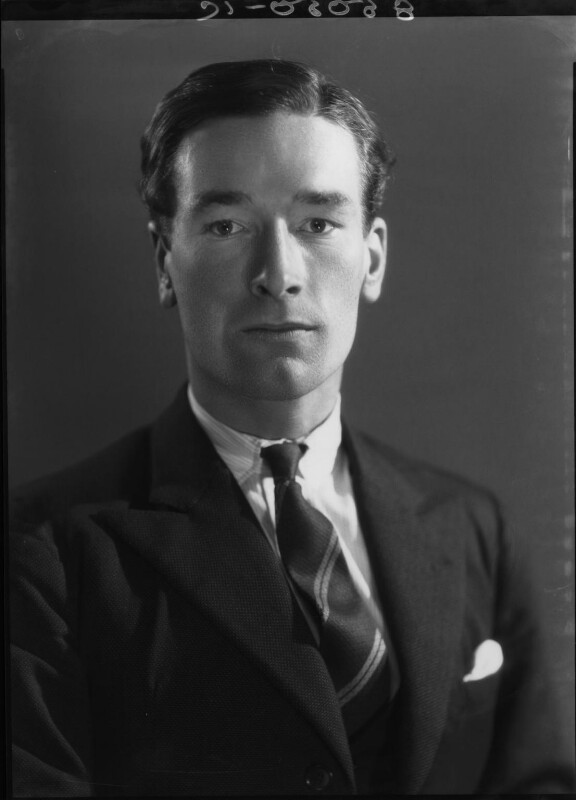
Peter Thorneycroft, Parliamentary Secretary to the Ministry of War Transport

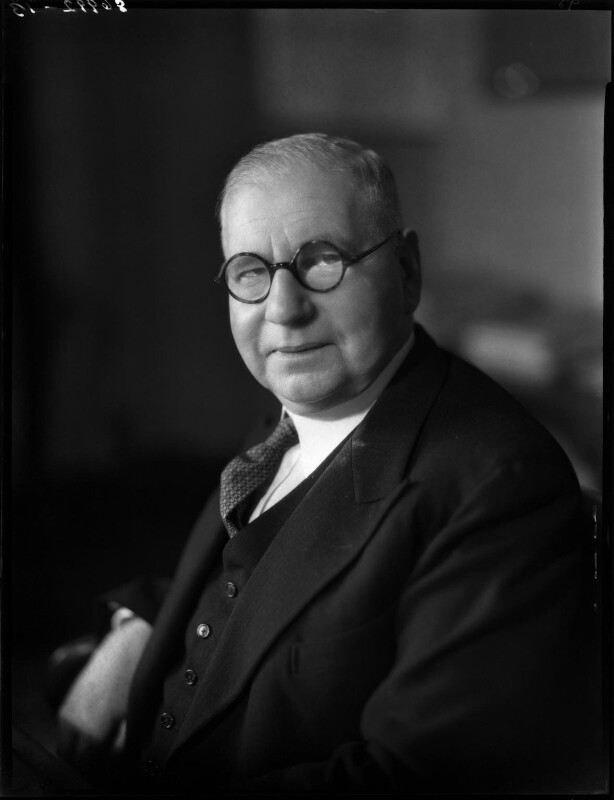
Sir Walter Womersley, Minister for Pensions

Portfolio	Minister	Party	Notes and citations
Lord Chancellor	Viscount Simon	Liberal National	in situ – appointed 10 May 1940
Chancellor of the Duchy of Lancaster	Sir Arthur Salter	Independent	succeeded Ernest Brown; Salter was previously Parliamentary Secretary to the Ministry of Shipping
Minister of Aircraft Production	Ernest Brown	Liberal National	succeeded Sir Stafford Cripps; Brown was previously Chancellor of the Duchy of Lancaster
Minister of Civil Aviation	Viscount Swinton	Conservative	in situ – appointed 8 October 1944
Minister of Food	John Llewellin	Conservative	in situ – appointed 11 November 1943
Minister of Fuel and Power	Gwilym Lloyd George	Liberal	in situ – appointed 3 June 1942
Minister of Health	Henry Willink	Conservative	in situ – appointed 11 November 1943
Minister of Information	Geoffrey Lloyd	Conservative	succeeded Brendan Bracken; Lloyd was previously Parliamentary Secretary to the Ministry of Fuel and Power
Minister of National Insurance	Leslie Hore-Belisha	National	succeeded Sir William Jowitt; Hore-Belisha had been a backbench MP since 1940 when he resigned as Secretary of State for War
Minister for Pensions	Sir Walter Womersley	Conservative	in situ – appointed 7 June 1939 by Neville Chamberlain; Womersley was the only minister to hold the same office throughout the war until the 1945 general election
Minister of Supply	Sir Andrew Duncan	National	in situ – appointed 4 February 1942
Minister of Town and Country Planning	William Morrison	Conservative	in situ – appointed 30 December 1942
Minister of War Transport	Lord Leathers	Conservative	in situ – appointed 1 May 1941
Minister of Works	Duncan Sandys	Conservative	in situ – appointed 21 November 1944
Attorney General	Sir David Maxwell Fyfe	Conservative	succeeded Sir Donald Somervell; Fyfe was previously Solicitor General
Solicitor General	Sir Walter Monckton	National	succeeded Sir David Maxwell Fyfe; a qualified legal advisor, Monckton was new to political office
Solicitor General for Scotland	Sir David King Murray	Conservative	in situ – appointed 5 June 1941
Lord Advocate	James Reid	Conservative	in situ – appointed 5 June 1941
Paymaster General	Lord Cherwell	Conservative	in situ – appointed 30 December 1942
Postmaster General	Harry Crookshank	Conservative	in situ – appointed 7 February 1943
Assistant Postmaster-General	William Anstruther-Gray	Conservative	succeeded Robert Grimston; an MP since 1931, Anstruther-Gray served in the Coldstream Guards from 1939 to May 1945
Minister-Resident for the Middle East	Sir Edward Grigg	National	in situ – appointed 21 November 1944; this ministry was terminated by the Attlee government
Minister-Resident for West Africa	Harold Balfour	Conservative	in situ – appointed 21 November 1944; this ministry was terminated by the Attlee government
Financial Secretary to the Admiralty	James Thomas	Conservative	in situ – appointed 25 September 1943
Parliamentary and Financial Secretary to the Admiralty	Sir Victor Warrender, Bt	Conservative	in situ – appointed 17 May 1940
Parliamentary Secretary to the Ministry of Agriculture and Fisheries	Donald Scott	Conservative	succeeded Tom Williams; Scott was previously a backbench MP; position held jointly with the Duke of Norfolk
Parliamentary Secretary to the Ministry of Agriculture and Fisheries	Duke of Norfolk	Conservative	in situ – appointed 8 February 1941; position held jointly with Donald Scott
Parliamentary Secretary to the Ministry of Aircraft Production	Alan Lennox-Boyd	Conservative	in situ – appointed 11 November 1943
Parliamentary Secretary to the Board of Trade	Charles Waterhouse	Conservative	in situ – appointed 8 February 1941
Parliamentary Secretary to the Ministry of Civil Aviation	Robert Perkins	Conservative	in situ – appointed 22 March 1945
Parliamentary Secretary to the Ministry of Education	Thelma Cazalet-Keir	Conservative	succeeded James Chuter Ede; Cazalet-Keir was previously a backbench MP
Parliamentary Secretary to the Ministry of Food	Florence Horsbrugh	Conservative	succeeded William Mabane; Horsbrugh was previously Parliamentary Secretary to the Ministry of Health
Parliamentary Secretary to the Ministry of Fuel and Power	Sir Austin Hudson, Bt	Conservative	succeeded Tom Smith; Hudson was previously a backbench MP
Parliamentary Secretary to the Ministry of Health	Hamilton Kerr	Conservative	succeeded Florence Horsbrugh; Kerr was previously a backbench MP who served in the Royal Air Force from 1939 to May 1945
Parliamentary Secretary for India and Burma	Earl of Scarbrough	Conservative	succeeded the Earl of Listowel; Scarbrough was a former MP who served in the Army during World War II
Parliamentary Secretary to the Ministry of Labour	Malcolm McCorquodale	Conservative	in situ – appointed 4 February 1942
Parliamentary Secretary to the Ministry of National Insurance	Charles Peat	Conservative	in situ – appointed 22 March 1945
Secretary for Overseas Trade	Spencer Summers	Conservative	succeeded Harcourt Johnstone; Summers was previously the Director-General of Regional Organisation at the Ministry of Supply
Parliamentary Secretary to the Ministry of Pensions	William Sidney	Conservative	succeeded Wilfred Paling; Sidney was previously an army officer who first entered Parliament in October 1944
Parliamentary Secretary to the Ministry of Production	John Maclay	Liberal National	succeeded George Garro-Jones; Maclay was previously head of the British Merchant Shipping Mission to Washington, DC
Parliamentary Secretary to the Ministry of Supply	Robert Grimston	Conservative	succeeded James de Rothschild; Grimston was previously Assistant Postmaster-General
Parliamentary Secretary to the Ministry of Town and Country Planning	Ronald Tree	Conservative	succeeded Arthur Jenkins; Tree was previously a backbench MP
Parliamentary Secretary to the Ministry of War Transport	Peter Thorneycroft	Conservative	no immediate predecessor; Thorneycroft was previously a backbench MP who served in the Royal Artillery through the war
Parliamentary Secretary to the Ministry of Works	Reginald Manningham-Buller	Conservative	succeeded George Hicks; Manningham-Buller was previously a backbench MP, having been first elected in 1943
Financial Secretary to the Treasury	Osbert Peake	Conservative	in situ – appointed 29 October 1944
Parliamentary Secretary to the Treasury	James Stuart	Conservative	in situ – appointed 14 January 1941
Lord of the Treasury	Alec Beechman	Liberal National	in situ – appointed 28 September 1943
Lord of the Treasury	Patrick Buchan-Hepburn	Conservative	in situ – appointed 6 December 1944
Lord of the Treasury	Robert Cary	Conservative	succeeded William John; Cary was previously the Parliamentary Private Secretary to the Secretary of State for India and Burma
Lord of the Treasury	Cedric Drewe	Conservative	in situ – appointed 7 July 1944
Lord of the Treasury	Charles Mott-Radclyffe	Conservative	succeeded Leslie Pym; Mott-Radclyffe was previously a backbench MP, first elected in 1942
Financial Secretary to the War Office	Maurice Petherick	Conservative	succeeded Arthur Henderson; Petherick was previously a backbench MP
Minister of State for Foreign Affairs	William Mabane	Liberal National	succeeded Richard Law; Mabane was previously Parliamentary Secretary to the Ministry of Food
Parliamentary Under-Secretary of State for Foreign Affairs	Lord Dunglass	Conservative	succeeded George Hall; Dunglass was previously a backbench MP having earlier been Parliamentary Private Secretary to Neville Chamberlain
Parliamentary Under-Secretary of State for Foreign Affairs	Lord Lovat	Conservative	newly created as a joint role; Lovat served as a Commandos officer during the war
Under-Secretary of State for Air	Quintin Hogg	Conservative	in situ – appointed 12 April 1945
Under-Secretary of State for Air	Earl Beatty	Conservative	succeeded Hugh Seely; Beatty was an army officer through the war
Under-Secretary of State for Dominion Affairs	Paul Emrys-Evans	Conservative	in situ – appointed 4 March 1942
Under-Secretary of State for Scotland	Allan Chapman	Conservative	in situ – appointed 4 March 1942
Under-Secretary of State for Scotland	Thomas Galbraith	Conservative	succeeded Joseph Westwood; Galbraith was previously a backbench MP and was in the Scottish Naval Command during the war
Under-Secretary of State for the Colonies	Duke of Devonshire	Conservative	in situ – appointed 1 January 1943
Under-Secretary of State for the Home Department	Earl of Munster	Conservative	in situ – appointed 31 October 1944
Under-Secretary of State for War	Sir Henry Page Croft	Conservative	in situ – appointed 17 May 1940
Civil Lord of the Admiralty	Richard Pilkington	Conservative	in situ – appointed 4 March 1942
Comptroller of the Household	Leslie Pym	Conservative	succeeded George Mathers; Pym was previously a Lord Commissioner of the Treasury
Treasurer of the Household	Sir James Edmondson	Conservative	in situ – appointed 12 March 1942
Vice-Chamberlain of the Household	Arthur Young	Conservative	in situ – appointed 13 July 1944
Captain of the Gentlemen-at-Arms	Earl Fortescue	Conservative	in situ – appointed 22 March 1945
Captain of the Yeomen of the Guard	Lord Templemore	Conservative	in situ – appointed 31 May 1940
Lord in Waiting	Lord Alness	Liberal National	in situ – appointed 4 June 1940
Lord in Waiting	Marquess of Normanby	Conservative	in situ – appointed 22 March 1945
Lord in Waiting	10th Duke of Northumberland	Conservative	succeeded Viscount Clifden; Northumberland was a Royal Artillery officer during the war

== Bibliography ==
- Ball, Stuart (2001). "Churchill and the Conservative Party". Transactions of the Royal Historical Society. 11. Cambridge University Press: 307–330. doi:10.1017/S0080440101000160. JSTOR 3679426. S2CID 153860359.
- Blake, Robert (1985). The Conservative Party From Peel To Thatcher. HarperCollins. ISBN 0-0068-6003-6.
- Butler, David; Butler, Gareth (1994). British Political Facts 1900–1994 (7 ed.). Basingstoke and London: The Macmillan Press. ISBN 978-03-12121-47-1.
- Charmley, John (1995) [1993]. Churchill: The End of Glory A Political Biography. London: Sceptre. ISBN 978-03-40599-22-8.
- Fenby, Jonathan (2011). The General: Charles de Gaulle and the France he saved. London: Simon & Schuster. ISBN 978-18-47394-10-1.
- Gilbert, Martin (1990). 'Never Despair': Winston S. Churchill 1945-1965. Vol. 8. London: Minerva. ISBN 978-0-74939-104-1.
- Gilbert, Martin (1991). Churchill: A Life. London: Heinemann. ISBN 978-04-34291-83-0.
- Hermiston, Roger (2016). All Behind You, Winston – Churchill's Great Coalition, 1940–45. London: Aurum Press. ISBN 978-17-81316-64-1.
- Leonard, Thomas M. (1977). Day By Day: The Forties. New York: Facts On File, Inc. ISBN 978-0-87196-375-8.
- Roberts, Andrew (2018). Churchill: Walking with Destiny. London: Allen Lane. ISBN 978-02-41205-63-1.
- Jenkins, Roy (2001). Churchill. London: Macmillan Press. ISBN 978-03-30488-05-1.
- Pelling, Henry (June 1980). "The 1945 General Election Reconsidered". The Historical Journal. 23 (2). Cambridge University Press: 399–414. doi:10.1017/S0018246X0002433X. JSTOR 2638675.
- Toye, Richard (July 2010). "Winston Churchill's "Crazy Broadcast": Party, Nation, and the 1945 Gestapo Speech". Journal of British Studies. 49 (3). Cambridge University Press: 655–680. doi:10.1086/652014. hdl:10871/9424. JSTOR 23265382.
- Toye, Richard (2015) [2013]. The Roar of the Lion: The Untold Story of Churchill's World War II Speeches. Oxford: Oxford University Press. ISBN 978-01-98715-45-0 – via Internet Archive.
- Zweiniger-Bargielowska, Ina (March 1994). "Rationing, Austerity and the Conservative Party Recovery after 1945". The Historical Journal. 37 (1). Cambridge University Press: 173–197. doi:10.1017/S0018246X00014758. JSTOR 2640057.

Preceded by Churchill war ministry	Government of the United Kingdom; 1945	Succeeded by First Attlee ministry
