= Oliver Lyttelton, 1st Viscount Chandos =

British businessman and government minister (1893–1972)

The Right Honourable The Viscount Chandos KG DSO MC PC
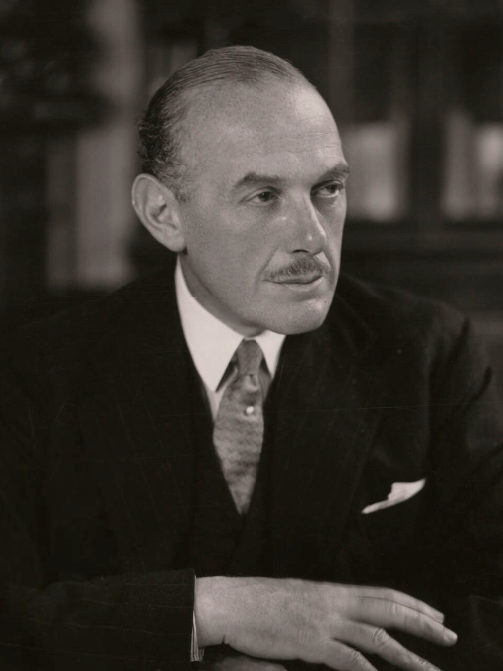
- Chandos in 1954

President of the Board of Trade
- In office 3 October 1940 – 29 June 1941
- Monarch: George VI
- Prime Minister: Winston Churchill
- Preceded by: Andrew Rae Duncan
- Succeeded by: Andrew Rae Duncan
- In office 25 May 1945 – 26 July 1945
- Monarch: George VI
- Prime Minister: Winston Churchill
- Preceded by: Hugh Dalton
- Succeeded by: Hon. Sir Stafford Cripps

Secretary of State for the Colonies
- In office 28 October 1951 – 28 July 1954
- Monarchs: George VI; Elizabeth II
- Prime Minister: Winston Churchill
- Preceded by: James Griffiths
- Succeeded by: Alan Lennox-Boyd

Personal details
- Born: 15 March 1893 Mayfair, London, UK
- Died: 21 January 1972 (aged 78) Marylebone, London, UK
- Party: Conservative
- Spouse: Lady Moira Osborne (1892–1976)
- Children: 4, including Antony
- Parent(s): Alfred Lyttelton; Edith Balfour
- Education: Trinity College, Cambridge

Oliver Lyttelton, 1st Viscount Chandos (15 March 1893 – 21 January 1972) was a British businessman from the Lyttelton family who was brought into government during the Second World War, holding a number of ministerial posts.

== Background, education and military career ==
Born in Mayfair, London, Lord Chandos was the son of the Rt. Hon. Alfred Lyttelton, younger son of George Lyttelton, 4th Baron Lyttelton. His mother was his father's second wife Edith, daughter of Archibald Balfour. He was educated at Eton and Trinity College, Cambridge. He served in the Grenadier Guards in the First World War, where he met Winston Churchill, and was awarded the Distinguished Service Order and Military Cross. The citation for his MC appeared in The London Gazette in October 1916 and reads as follows:

For conspicuous gallantry in action. He showed great bravery in the attack, led a company forward, and was largely instrumental in taking 100 prisoners. He stuck to his position for five hours under fire, till obliged to retire to prevent being surrounded.

From 1947 to 1955 he served as the first President of Farnborough Bowling Club, Hampshire, in his Aldershot parliamentary constituency.

== Business career ==
According to the Dictionary of National Biography:

In August 1920 Lyttelton was invited to join the British Metal Corporation, a firm established at the instigation of the British government with the long-term strategic objective of undermining Germany's domination of the metal trade and making the British Empire self-supporting in non-ferrous metals. After a brief apprenticeship Lyttelton served as general manager of the corporation and subsequently as managing director. He also became chairman of the London Tin Corporation and joined the boards of a number of foreign companies, including that of the German firm Metallgesellschaft. He became one of a small group of individuals who through their multiple, interlocking directorships, effectively controlled the global metal trade. . . . On the outbreak of war in September 1939 he was appointed controller of non-ferrous metals. He set about exploiting his extensive network of personal contacts and his intimate knowledge of the mining industry in order to secure for Britain vital supplies of metals at highly advantageous rates. His unconventional methods caused some anxiety at the Treasury, but over the course of the war they saved Britain a substantial amount of money.

After the Conservative Party left office in 1945, Lyttelton became the chairman of Associated Electrical Industries.

== Political career ==
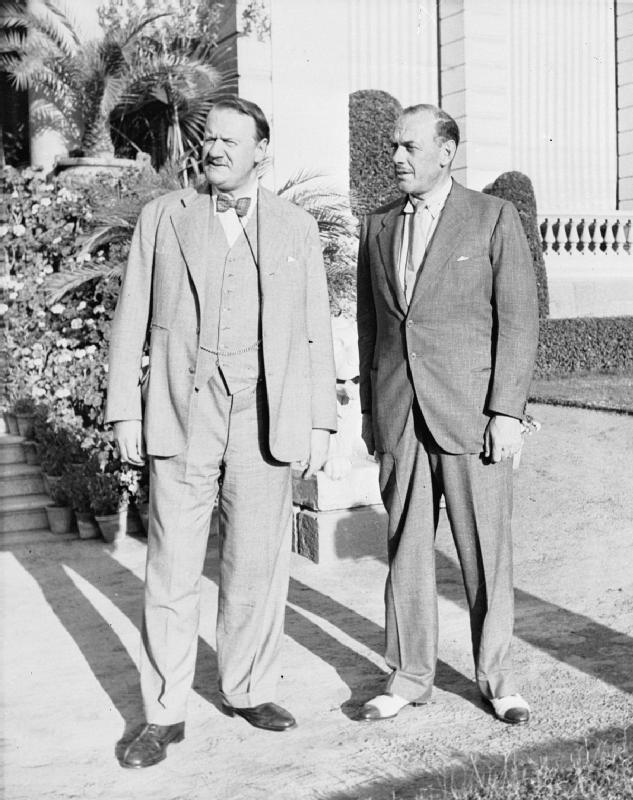
Oliver Lyttelton (right) with Sir Miles Lampson at the British Embassy in Cairo, 1941

Chandos entered Parliament as Conservative Member of Parliament (MP) for Aldershot in a wartime by-election in 1940 and was sworn of the Privy Council the same year. He entered Winston Churchill's war coalition as President of the Board of Trade in 1940, a post he held until 1941, and then served as Minister-Resident for the Middle East from 1941 to 1942, and as Minister of Production from 1942 to 1945. He was again President of the Board of Trade in Churchill's brief 1945 caretaker government. After the Conservatives' 1951 election victory, he was considered for the job of Chancellor of the Exchequer. He fully expected the job, but was seen as too linked to business and the City of London, so it was given to Rab Butler. Instead he became Secretary of State for the Colonies

== At the Colonial Office ==
Lyttleton was Secretary of State at the Colonial Office until 1954. Lyttelton was strongly anti-communist and in 1953 said "Her Majesty's Government are not prepared to tolerate the setting up of Communist states in the British Commonwealth".

== After retirement ==
On retirement in 1954, he was elevated to the peerage as Viscount Chandos, of Aldershot in the County of Southampton. During the 1963 Conservative Party leadership contest, Lyttelton favoured Rab Butler, but he no longer carried much influence in the party.

== Family home ==
In 1948, the 5th Earl Nelson sold Trafalgar Park, Wiltshire, to John Osborne, 11th Duke of Leeds, whose brother-in-law Oliver Lyttelton, 1st Viscount Chandos, lived there while he was an MP. Eventually Lyttleton bought the estate and lived there until 1971, when Jeremy Pinckney bought the house.

== Later career ==
After ending his career as an MP, Chandos returned to Associated Electrical Industries, and steered it to become a major British company. In 1961 he was invited to deliver the MacMillan Memorial Lecture to the Institution of Engineers and Shipbuilders in Scotland. He chose the subject "Jungle – or Cloister? – Some Thoughts on the Present Industrial Scene".

=== National Theatre ===
In 1962, Chandos became the first chairman of the National Theatre, serving until 1971. He then served as president until his death. His parents had been active campaigners for its development, and the Lyttelton Theatre, part of the National's South Bank complex, was named after him.

During Laurence Olivier's tenure as director of the National, Chandos was a central figure in the controversy over a proposed production of Rolf Hochhuth's Soldiers. The production had been championed by Olivier's dramaturg, Kenneth Tynan. Though Olivier, a great admirer of Winston Churchill (who essentially is accused of assassinating Polish Prime Minister General Władysław Sikorski by Hochhuth) did not particularly like the play or its depiction of Churchill (whom Tynan wanted him to play), he backed his dramaturg. There was a potential problem with the Lord Chamberlain, who might not have licensed the play due to its controversial stand on Churchill. The National's board vetoed the production and Lord Chandos damned the play as a "grotesque and grievous libel".

=== Order of the Garter ===
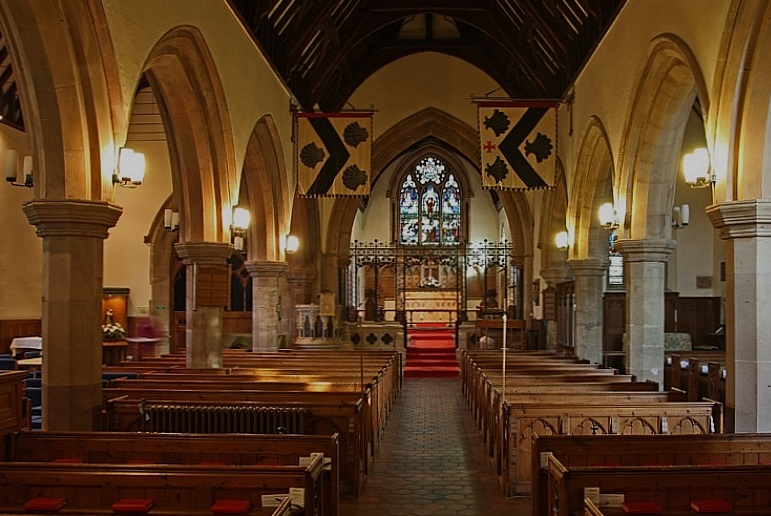
Interior of St John the Baptist, Hagley, with the Garter banners of the 1st Viscount Chandos and the 10th Viscount Cobham

In 1970 he was made a Knight Companion of the Garter. His Garter banner, which hung in St George's Chapel in Windsor Castle during his lifetime, is now on display in the Church of St John the Baptist, Hagley.

== Marriage and children ==
Lord Chandos married Lady Moira Godolphin Osborne, a daughter of George Osborne, 10th Duke of Leeds on 30 January 1920. They had three sons and one daughter:

- Antony Alfred Lyttelton, 2nd Viscount Chandos (born 23 October 1920, died 28 November 1980)
- The Hon Rosemary Lyttelton (born 30 May 1922, died 21 October 2003), married Anthony Chaplin, 3rd Viscount Chaplin in 1951.
- Lieutenant Julian Lyttelton (born 30 August 1923, killed in action in Italy on 11 October 1944 during World War II
- The Hon Nicholas Adrian Oliver Lyttelton (born 26 March 1937)

Lord Chandos died in Marylebone, London, in January 1972, aged 78, and was succeeded by his eldest son, Antony. Lady Chandos died in May 1976, aged 84.

== Arms ==
Coat of arms of Oliver Lyttelton, 1st Viscount Chandos, KG, DSO, MC, PC
Coronet A Viscount's Coronet Crest A moor's head in profile couped at the shoulders proper wreathed around the temples Argent and Sable the ear ringed Argent and charged on the neck with a cross moline for difference Gules. Escutcheon Argent a chevron between three escallops Sable in centre chief a cross moline for difference Gules. Supporters On either side a merman proper holding in the outer hand a trident pendant from a rope around the inner shoulder an escutcheon Or charged with a pile Gules, being the original arms of Chandos. Motto FAIS CE QUE DOIT; ADVIENNE QUE POURRA (Do what one must, come what may).

Parliament of the United Kingdom
Preceded by Viscount Wolmer	Member of Parliament for Aldershot; 1940–1954	Succeeded by Eric Errington
Political offices
Preceded by Andrew Rae Duncan	President of the Board of Trade; 1940–1941	Succeeded by Andrew Rae Duncan
New office	Minister of State in the Middle East; 1941–1942	Succeeded by Richard Casey
Preceded by The Lord Beaverbrook as Minister of War Production	Minister of Production; 1942–1945	Office abolished
Preceded by Hugh Dalton	President of the Board of Trade; 1945	Succeeded by Sir Stafford Cripps
Preceded by James Griffiths	Secretary of State for the Colonies; 1951–1954	Succeeded by Alan Lennox-Boyd
Peerage of the United Kingdom
New creation	Viscount Chandos; 1954–1972	Succeeded by Antony Lyttelton
