= Thomas Lyttelton, 3rd Viscount Chandos =

British peer and politician (born 1953)

The Right Honourable The Viscount Chandos
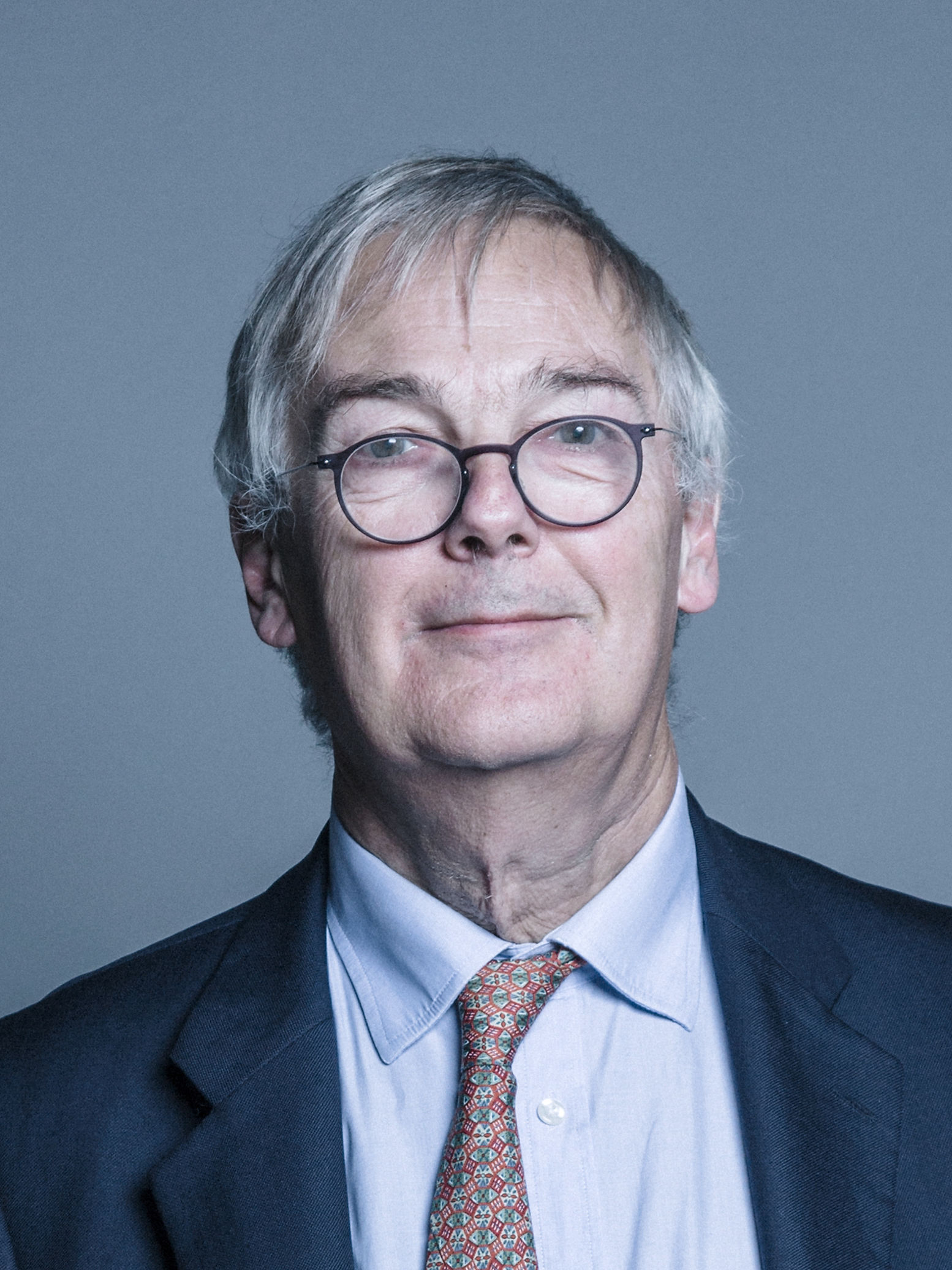

Member of the House of Lords
- Lord Temporal
- Hereditary peerage 28 November 1980 – 11 November 1999
- Preceded by: The 2nd Viscount Chandos
- Succeeded by: Seat abolished
- Incumbent
- Life peerage 19 April 2000

Personal details
- Born: 12 February 1953 (age 73)
- Party: SDP (1981–88) 'Continuing' SDP (1988–90); Labour (since 1990)
- Spouse: Arabella Sarah Lucy Bailey (m. 1985)
- Children: 3
- Parent(s): Antony Lyttelton, 2nd Viscount Chandos; Caroline Lascelles
- Relatives: See Lyttelton family
- Education: Eton College
- Alma mater: Worcester College, Oxford

Thomas Orlando Lyttelton, 3rd Viscount Chandos, Baron Lyttelton of Aldershot (born 12 February 1953), is a British politician of the Labour Party. He has served as a hereditary and life peer.

== Early life ==
A member of the Lyttelton family, Chandos is the elder son of Antony Lyttelton, 2nd Viscount Chandos, and Caroline Lascelles, a daughter of Sir Alan Lascelles (Private Secretary to both King George VI and Queen Elizabeth II). He was educated at Eton and Worcester College, Oxford.

== Career ==
Chandos succeeded his father in the viscountcy in 1980. He initially sat on the Social Democratic Party (SDP) benches, but when the party merged with the Liberals in 1988 he elected to become a member of the anti-merger 'continuing' SDP, led by David Owen, instead. Alongside Owen and several other Social Democrats, Chandos established the Social Market Foundation (SMF) in 1989, becoming its first chairman. When the 'continuing' SDP collapsed a year later he decided to join the Labour Party, rather than – as many of his colleagues in the SMF did – the Conservative Party.

Chandos lost his seat in the House of Lords after the House of Lords Act 1999. However, in 2000 he was created a life peer as Baron Lyttelton of Aldershot, of Aldershot in the County of Hampshire, and was able to return to the House of Lords.

== Personal life ==
Chandos married Arabella Sarah Lucy Bailey, daughter of John Adrian Bailey and Lady Mary Baillie-Hamilton, on 19 October 1985. They have three children:

- The Hon. Oliver Antony Lyttelton (born 21 February 1986), heir apparent to the viscountcy
- The Hon. Benedict Lyttelton (born 30 April 1988)
- The Hon. Rosanna Mary Lyttelton (born 19 March 1990)

Peerage of the United Kingdom
Preceded by Antony Lyttelton	Viscount Chandos; 1980–present	Incumbent
