= 1940 Aldershot by-election =

UK Parliamentary by-election

The 1940 Aldershot by-election was held on 26 November 1940. The by-election was held due to the succession to the peerage of the incumbent Conservative MP, Roundell Palmer. It was won unopposed by the Conservative candidate Oliver Lyttelton.

1940 Aldershot by-election
Party	Candidate	Votes	%	±%
Conservative	Oliver Lyttelton	Unopposed		
Conservative hold				
