= Antony Lyttelton, 2nd Viscount Chandos =

British peer

The Right Honourable The Viscount Chandos
- Born: 23 October 1920
- Died: 28 November 1980 (aged 60)
- Spouse: Caroline Mary Lascelles
- Children: 4, including Thomas
- Parent(s): Oliver Lyttelton, 1st Viscount Chandos; Lady Moira Godolphin Osborne

Arms of the Viscount Chandos from the Lyttelton family

Antony Alfred Lyttelton, 2nd Viscount Chandos (23 October 1920 – 28 November 1980) was a British soldier and peer from the Lyttelton family.

== Biography ==
Lord Chandos was the son of Oliver Lyttelton, 1st Viscount Chandos, and Lady Moira Godolphin Osborne, a daughter of George Osborne, 10th Duke of Leeds. He was educated at Eton and Trinity College, Cambridge. Chandos served in the General Staff during World War II in the Mediterranean from 1942 to 1945, where he was mentioned in dispatches. In 1950 Chandos joined the stockbrokers Panmure Gordon & Co. where he stayed until 1975.

== Marriage and children ==
Chandos married Caroline Mary Lascelles, daughter of Sir Tommy Lascelles, on 20 May 1949 at St. George's Chapel in the presence of King George VI and Queen Elizabeth, the Queen Mother. They had two sons and two daughters:

- Hon Laura Katherine Lyttelton (born 18 May 1950)
- Thomas Orlando Lyttelton, 3rd Viscount Chandos, Baron Lyttelton of Aldershot (life peerage), (born 12 February 1953).
- Hon Matthew Peregrine Antony Lyttelton (born 21 April 1956)
- Hon Deborah Claire Lyttelton (born 18 September 1963)

Lord Chandos died in 1980 and was succeeded in the viscountcy by his elder son, Thomas.

Peerage of the United Kingdom
Preceded by Oliver Lyttelton	Viscount Chandos; 21 January 1972 – 28 November 1980	Succeeded by Thomas Lyttelton
