= Viscount Chandos =

Title in the Peerage of the United Kingdom

Arms of the Viscounts Chandos from the Lyttelton family, incorporating a 'cross moline', the mark of cadency for the eighth son

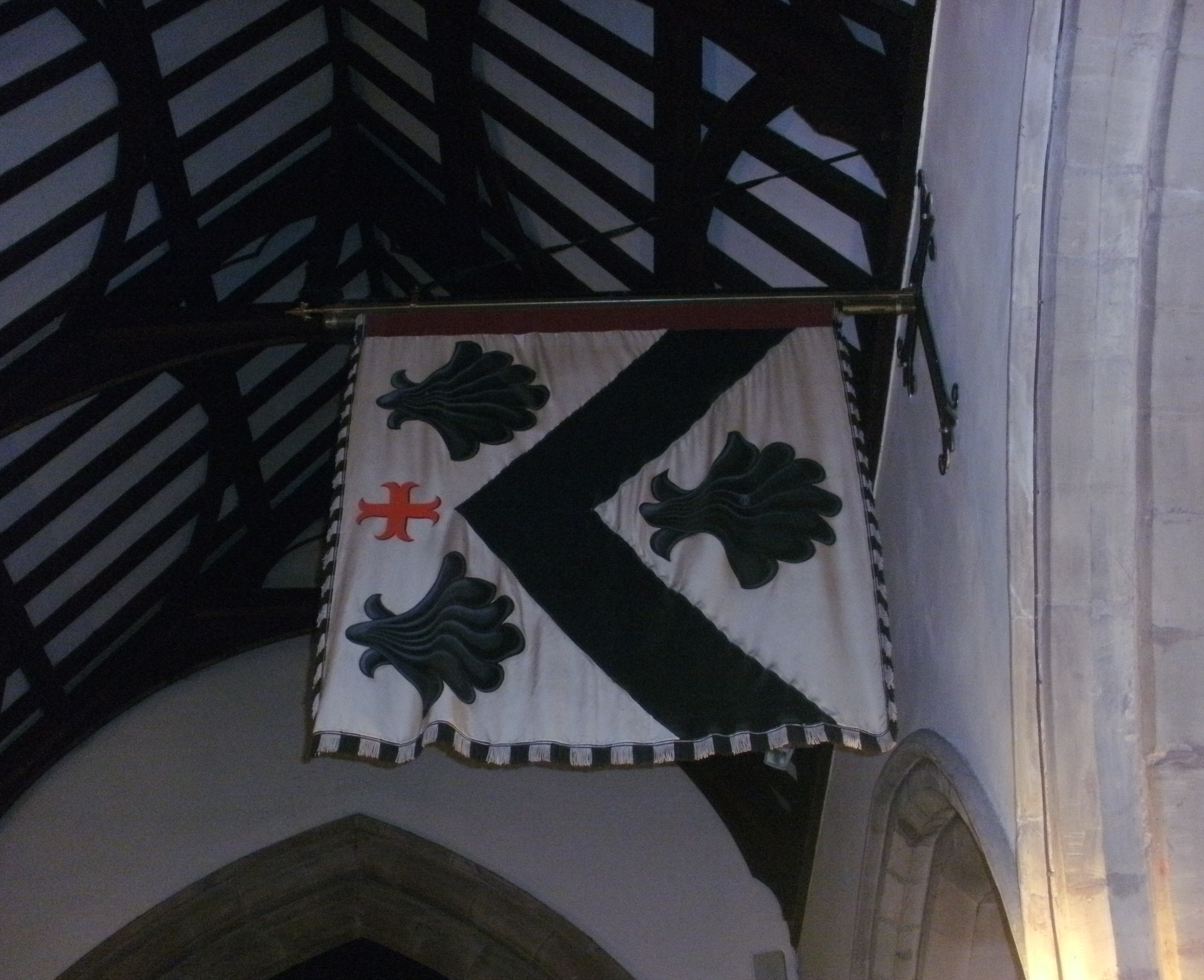
St John the Baptist Church, Hagley, banner of the 1st Viscount Chandos as Knight of the Garter

Viscount Chandos, of Aldershot in the County of Southampton, is a title in the Peerage of the United Kingdom and held by a branch of the Lyttelton family. It was created in 1954 for the businessman and public servant Oliver Lyttelton. He was the son of the politician and sportsman Alfred Lyttelton, eighth son of George Lyttelton, 4th Baron Lyttelton, whose eldest son, the 5th Baron Lyttelton, also succeeded his kinsman the 3rd Duke of Buckingham and Chandos as 8th Viscount Cobham in 1889. As of 2017 the title of Viscount Chandos is held by the first Viscount's grandson, the third Viscount, who succeeded his father in 1980. He lost his seat in the House of Lords after the passing of the House of Lords Act of 1999, which removed the automatic right of hereditary peers to sit in the upper chamber of Parliament. However, in 2000 he was given a life peerage as Baron Lyttelton of Aldershot, of Aldershot in the County of Hampshire, and was thus able to return to the House of Lords, where he now sits on the Labour benches. Lord Chandos is also in remainder to the viscountcy of Cobham and its subsidiary titles the barony of Cobham, the barony of Lyttelton, the barony of Westcote and the baronetcy of Frankley.

== Viscounts Chandos (1954) ==
- Oliver Lyttelton, 1st Viscount Chandos (1893–1972)
- Antony Alfred Lyttelton, 2nd Viscount Chandos (1920–1980)
- Thomas Orlando Lyttelton, 3rd Viscount Chandos (b. 1953)

The heir apparent is the present holder's son, the Hon. Oliver Antony Lyttelton (b. 1986)

== Line of Succession ==
- Oliver Lyttelton, 1st Viscount Chandos (1893–1972)
  - Antony Alfred Lyttelton, 2nd Viscount Chandos (1920–1980)
    - Thomas Orlando Lyttelton, 3rd Viscount Chandos, Baron Lyttelton of Aldershot (b. 1953)
      - (1) Hon. Oliver Antony Lyttelton (b. 1986)
      - (2) Hon. Benedict Lyttelton (b. 1988)
    - (3) Hon. Matthew Peregrine Antony Lyttelton (b. 1956)
  - (4) Hon. Nicholas Adrian Oliver Lyttelton (b. 1937)
    - (5) Francis Sebastian Jasper Lyttelton (b. 1967)
      - (6) Oliver Lyttelton Sopeña (b. 2009)

== See also ==
- Viscount Cobham and Baron Lyttelton
- Duke of Buckingham and Chandos
- Duke of Chandos

== Notes ==
- Kidd, Charles, Williamson, David (editors). Debrett's Peerage and Baronetage (1990 edition). New York: St Martin's Press, 1990.
- Leigh Rayment's Peerage Pages
