= Minister of Production =

British government minister; 1942–1945

The Minister of Production was a British government position that existed during the Second World War, heading the Ministry of Production.

Initially the post was called "Minister of War Production" when it was created in February 1942, but the first Minister, Lord Beaverbrook, resigned after only two weeks in office. A month later upon the appointment of the second holder the post was titled "Minister of Production".

== Minister of War Production (1942) ==
Portrait	Name	Term of office		Political party
	Max Aitken; 1st Baron Beaverbrook	4 February 1942	19 February 1942	Conservative

== Minister of Production (1942-1945) ==
Portrait	Name	Term of office		Political party
	Oliver Lyttelton; MP for Aldershot	12 March 1942	27 July 1945	Conservative
