= Minister-Resident for the Middle East =

The Minister-Resident for the Middle East was a British Government cabinet position for most of the duration of World War II.

The position was created in 1941 and the holder was made a member of the war cabinet. The minister served as the overall eyes and ears of the British Government in the Middle East and was available for local military and civilian officials to consult on British Government policy and positions. In particular the aim of the position was to relieve the military commanders of extraneous responsibilities to allow them to prosecute the war more effectively. The first holder of the office was Oliver Lyttelton from June 1941 to March 1942. He was succeeded in turn by Richard Casey who served until January 1944. His successor, Lord Moyne was assassinated by Zionist militants in November 1944. The last minister was Sir Edward Grigg until July 1945, when the post was abolished.
