= 1930 Birthday Honours =

British government recognitions

The King's Birthday Honours 1930 were appointments by King George V to various orders and honours to reward and highlight good works by members of the British Empire. The appointments were made to celebrate the official birthday of The King. They were published on 30 May 1930.

The recipients of honours are displayed here as they were styled before their new honour, and arranged by honour, with classes (Knight, Knight Grand Cross, etc.) and then divisions (Military, Civil, etc.) as appropriate.

== British Empire ==
=== Baron ===
- The Right Honourable Noel Edward Buxton, MP, Minister of Agriculture and Fisheries.
- Henry Sanderson Furniss, MA, Principal of Ruskin College, Oxford, 1916–25. For services to education.
- The Right Honourable Sir Esme William Howard, GCB, GCMG, CVO. Lately His Majesty's Ambassador to the United States of America.

=== Baronet ===
- Sir Leonard Dunning, one of HM Inspectors of Constabulary.
- Basil Mott, CB, Consulting Engineer. A past President of the Institution of Civil Engineers.
- Frederick Henry Royce, OBE, MIME, MIEE, MIAE. Founder, Director and Chief Engineer of Rolls-Royce Ltd.

=== Knight Bachelor ===
- Harry John Barclay, FCA, Honorary Secretary of the Amateur Athletic Association.
- Captain Ernest Nathaniel Bennett, JP, MP. Member of Parliament for Central Cardiff since 1929. For political and public services.
- Norman Godfrey Bennett, MA, MB, BCh, MRCS, LRCP, LDS. President of the British Dental Association.
- Edward Brown, LLD, FLS. Secretary, National Poultry Council of England and Wales.
- John Charles Couper, MVO, OBE, WS. Purse Bearer to the Lord High Commissioner to the General Assembly of the Church of Scotland.
- Valentine George Crittall, JP. Member of Parliament for Maldon (Essex) 1923–24. For political and public services.
- Major Thomas Henry Crozier. Chief Inspector of Explosives, Home Office.
- Henry Augustus Ferguson-Davie, CB. Principal Clerk, Public Bill Office, and Clerk of the Fees, House of Commons.
- Arthur Denman, MA, FSA. Clerk of Assize, South Eastern Circuit.
- Eliot Arthur de Pass, Chairman, West India Committee.
- Arthur Stanley Eddington, MA, MSc, LLD, FRS. Plumian Professor of Astronomy in the University of Cambridge.
- Alderman George Edwards, OBE, JP. Member of Parliament for South Norfolk, 1920–22 and 1923–24. Member of Norfolk County Council since 1906. For services to Agricultural workers.
- Percy Winn Everett, MA, FSS. For services in connection with the Boy Scout and Girl Guide Movements.
- Alfred Edward Faulkner, CB, CBE. Permanent Under Secretary, Mines Department.
- Harold Delf Gillies, OBE, FRCS, LRCP, Major Royal Army Medical Corps (Retd.) Chief Plastic Surgeon to the Ministry of Pensions. For valuable services in the treatment of facial disfigurement.
- Alexander Glegg, JP. Sometime Chairman of the Council of the Congregational Union of England and Wales, and for a number of years Treasurer of the London Congregational Union.
- Francis William Goodenough, CBE, Controller of Gas Sales to the Gas, Light & Coke Company. Chairman of the British Commercial Gas Association. President of the Incorporated Sales Managers Association. Chairman of the Government Committee on Education for Salesmanship.
- Andrew Grierson, SSC, JP. For eminent services to local government. Town Clerk of the City of Edinburgh.
- Professor Leonard Erskine Hill, MB, MRCS, LRCP, FRS, Hon. ARIBA. Director, Department of Applied Physiology, National Institute for Medical Research.
- Thomas Eustace Hill, OBE, MA, MB, CM, BSc, FIC. Lately Medical Officer of Health in the County of Durham.
- Councillor Arthur William Lambert, MC, JP. Late Chairman of the Executive Committee of the North East Coast Exhibition and for services in connection with schemes for the migration of labour and for miners' welfare.
- Henry Alfred Lytton. A member of the D'Oyly Carte Opera Company.
- Henry William Watson McAnally, CB, JP. Principal Assistant Secretary, Air Ministry.
- Norman Macgregor Macpherson, SSC. Law Agent in Scotland to the Treasury.
- Guy Anstruther Knox Marshall, CMG, DSc, FRS. Director of the Imperial Bureau of Entomology.
- William Cecil Owen, Chief Assistant Solicitor to the Treasury.
- Henry Maunsell Richards, CB, LLD. Senior Chief Inspector, Board of Education.
- John Arthur Thomson, MA, LLD. Regius Professor of Natural History in the University of Aberdeen.
- William Richard Williams. For services in connection with the Coalfields Distress Fund. Lately Lord Mayor of Cardiff.
- Herbert Wright. Chairman of the Executive Committee of the Governing Body, Imperial College of Science and Technology, South Kensington. For long and valuable services to the College.

Dominions

- Alfred Seymour Bankart, MBE, Chairman of the Auckland War Memorial Committee. For public and charitable services in the Dominion of New Zealand.
- The Honourable Alexander Gordon, formerly Judge of the Supreme Court, State of New South Wales.
- The Honourable John Waters Kirwan, President of the Legislative Council, State of Western Australia.
- Edward Henry Macartney, Agent-General in London for the State of Queensland.

India

- Mr. Justice Howard Owen Compton Beasley, OBE, Chief Justice of the High Court of Judicature at Madras.
- Mr. Justice Arthur Page, KC. Chief Justice of the High Court of Judicature at Rangoon, Burma.
- Raja Manmatha Nath Ray Chaudhuri, of Santosh, President, Legislative Council, Bengal.
- Mr. Justice Cecil Fforde, KC. lately Judge of the High Court of Judicature at Lahore, Punjab.
- Henry Hewey Francis Macdonald Tyler, CIE, Indian Civil Service, lately Secretary of the Indian Central Committee, Indian Statutory Commission.
- Rai Bahadur Moti Sagar, Vice-Chancellor, Delhi University, Delhi.
- Hugh Wesley Allan Watson, Indian Forest Service, lately Chief Conservator of Forests, Burma.
- Walter Thomas Layton, CH, CBE, Financial Assessor to the Indian Statutory Commission.
- Raja Moti Chand, CIE, of Benares, Member of the Council of State.
- Nawab Say ad Muhammad Mehr Shah, Member of the Council of State, of Jalalpur, Punjab.
- Shams-ul-Ulama Jivanji Jamshedji Modi, CIE, Bombay.
- Khan Bahadur Behramji Hormasji Nanavati, CIE, Medical Practitioner, Bombay.

Colonies, Protectorates, &c.

- Steuart Spencer Davis, CMG. Treasurer, Palestine.
- George Campbell Deane, Chief Justice, Gold Coast.
- John Randall Phillips, OBE, MB, President of the Legislative Council, Barbados.

=== Order of the Bath ===
==== Knight Grand Cross of the Order of the Bath (GCB) ====
Military Division

Royal Navy

- Admiral of the Fleet Sir Roger John Brownlow Keyes, Bt, KCB, KCVO, CMG, DSO, LLD, DCL (Oxon).
- Admiral Sir Edwyn Sinclair Alexander-Sinclair, KCB, MVO, First and Principal Naval Aide-de-Camp to The King.

==== Knight Commander of the Order of the Bath (KCB) ====
Military Division

Royal Navy

- Vice-Admiral David Murray Anderson, CB, CMG, MVO.
- Surgeon Vice-Admiral Arthur Gaskell, CB, OBE, FRCS(Eng.) LRCP, DPH, KHS.

Army

- Lieutenant-General Alexander Ernest Wardrop, CB, CMG, Colonel 2/9th Jat Regiment, Indian Army. Half-pay list.
- Major-General Henry Fleetwood Thuillier, CB, CMG, (Retired pay), late Commander 52nd (Lowland) Division, Territorial Army, Scottish Command.
- Lieutenant-General Charles Alexander Campbell Godwin, CB, CMG, DSO, Indian Army, Commander, Peshawar District, India.

Royal Air Force

- Air Vice-Marshal David Munro, CB, CIE, MB, ChB, FRCS(E), (Retd.)

Civil Division

- Colonel William Coates, CB, CBE, VD, TD, DL, (Retd.) Territorial Army.

==== Companion of the Order of the Bath (CB) ====
Military Division

Royal Navy

- Rear-Admiral Cecil Vivian Usborne, CMG.
- Rear-Admiral George Thomas Carlisle Parker Swabey, DSO, (Retd.)
- Engineer Rear-Admiral Robert Walter Benjamin Andrews.
- Captain Roger Mowbray Bellairs, CMG.
- Colonel George Mathew, Royal Marines.

Army

- Colonel (temporary Brigadier) John Frederick Charles Fuller, CBE, DSO, (late The Oxfordshire and Buckinghamshire Light Infantry), Commander, 14th Infantry Brigade, Northern Command.
- Colonel Gladwyn Dundas Jebb, CMG, CBE, DSO, (late The Bedfordshire and Hertfordshire Regiment), Commander, 126th (East Lancashire and Border) Infantry Brigade, Territorial Army, Western Command.
- Colonel (temporary Brigadier) Francis Douglas Logan, CMG, DSO, (late Royal Artillery), Brigadier in charge of Administration, The British Troops in Egypt.
- Colonel Arthur Stedman Cotton, CMG, CBE, DSO, AM, (late Royal Artillery), late Brigadier, Royal Artillery, Northern Command, India.
- Colonel (temporary Brigadier) Cyril Mosley Wagstaff, CMG, CIE, DSO, ADC, (late Royal Engineers), Commander, Nowshera Brigade, Northern Command, India.
- Colonel (temporary Brigadier) William Alan Blake, CMG, DSO, ADC, (late The King's Regiment (Liverpool)), Commander, 13th Infantry Brigade, Northern Command.
- Major-General Sydney Frederick Muspratt, CSI, CIE, DSO, Indian Army, Deputy Chief of the General Staff, and Director of Staff Duties, General Staff Branch, Headquarters, India.
- Major-General Roger Cochrane Wilson, DSO, MC, Indian Army, late Commander, Wana Brigade, Northern Command, India.
- Colonel (temporary Brigadier) Sydney Buxton Pope, DSO, Indian Army, Commander, Razmak Brigade, Northern Command, India.
- Colonel Frank Alexander Finnis, OBE, Indian Army, Deputy Director of Ordnance Services, Master-General of the Ordnance Branch, Headquarters, India.

Civil Division

- Colonel Gerald Beach, OBE, TD, Territorial Army.
- Colonel Anthony Wood Martyn, DSO, OBE, (Retd.)
- Charles Herbert Bressey, CBE, Chief Engineer, Roads Department, Ministry of Transport.
- Colonel Lord Arthur Howe Browne, KBE, Principal Assistant Secretary, Imperial War Graves Commission.
- Richard Henry Archibald Carter, Assistant Secretary, India Office.
- Robert Leslie Craigie, CMG. For services in connection with the Naval Conference, (Counsellor, Foreign Office).
- George Chester Duggan, OBE, Principal Assistant Secretary, Ministry of Finance, Northern Ireland.

=== Order of Merit (OM) ===
- Samuel Alexander, LittD, LLD, DLitt, in recognition of his eminent position as a British Philosopher and for his services as a writer and teacher.
- Montague Rhodes James, LittD, DLitt, LLD, DCL. In recognition of his scholarship and of his eminent contributions to Mediaeval Learning.
- George Macaulay Trevelyan, CBE, DCL, LLD, LittD, Regius Professor of Modern History, University of Cambridge. In recognition of his eminent position as an Historian and of his services to Literature.

=== Order of the Star of India ===
==== Knight Grand Commander of the Order of the Star of India (GCSI) ====
- The Right Honourable Sir John Allsebrook Simon, KCVO, OBE, KC, MP, Chairman, Indian Statutory Commission.
- Field-Marshal Sir Claud William Jacob, GCB, KCSI, KCMG, lately Secretary, Military Department, India Office.

==== Knight Commander of the Order of the Star of India (KCSI) ====
- Sir George Rainy, KCIE, CSI, Indian Civil Service, Member of the Governor-General's Executive Council.
- Sir Denys de Saumarez Bray, KCIE, CSI, CBE, Indian Civil Service (Retd.), lately Foreign Secretary to the Government of India.
- John Ernest Buttery Hotson, CSI, CBE, Indian Civil Service, Member of the Executive Council of the Governor of Bombay.

==== Companion of the Order of the Star of India (CSI) ====
- John Edwin Clapham Jukes, CIE, Indian Civil Service, lately Controller of Civil Accounts.
- Harold Anselm Bellamy Vernon, CIE, Indian Civil Service, Member of the Board of Revenue, Madras.

=== Order of Saint Michael and Saint George ===
==== Knight Grand Cross of the Order of St Michael and St George (GCMG) ====
- Sir Alexander Wood Renton, KCMG, KC, lately Chairman of the Irish Grants Committee.
- Sir Herbert James Stanley, KCMG, Governor and Commander-in-Chief of the Island of Ceylon.
- The Honourable Sir William Augustus Forbes Erskine, KCMG, MVO, His Majesty's Ambassador Extraordinary and Plenipotentiary at Warsaw.

==== Knight Commander of the Order of St Michael and St George (KCMG) ====
- Sir William Henry Clark, KCSI, CMG, High Commissioner in Canada for His Majesty's Government in the United Kingdom of Great Britain and Northern Ireland.
- Thomas Mason Wilford, KC. High Commissioner in London for the Dominion of New Zealand.
- Sir Arthur George Murchison Fletcher, Kt, CMG, OBE, Governor and Commander-in-Chief of the Colony of Fiji, and High Commissioner for the Western Pacific.
- Reginald Fleming Johnston, CMG, CBE, Commissioner of Wei-hai-Wei.
- Colonel Frederick Palmer, CIE, MInstCE, of the firm of Messrs. Rendel, Palmer and Tritton, Consulting Engineers to the Crown Agents for the Colonies.
- Henry Getty Chilton, CMG, His Majesty's Envoy Extraordinary and Minister Plenipotentiary to the Holy See.
- Herbert William Malkin, CB, CMG, Legal Adviser to the Foreign Office.
- Claud Frederick William Russell. His Majesty's Envoy Extraordinary and Minister Plenipotentiary at Berne.

==== Companion of the Order of St Michael and St George (CMG) ====
- Robert Albert Anderson. For public services in the Dominion of New Zealand.
- Lieutenant-Colonel and Brevet Colonel Christopher William, Baron Barnard, MC, TD, Chairman of the Northumberland and Durham Migration Committee.
- Thomas Ainsworth Dickson, MC, Resident Commissioner, Swaziland.
- William James Gall, Under Secretary, Home Secretary's Department, and Comptroller General of Prisons, State of Queensland.
- Hugh Marrison Gower Jackson, OBE, Chief Native Commissioner, Southern Rhodesia.
- Robert Lewis Parker, LLB. For public services in the State of Tasmania.
- Paul Desiré Nestor Verschaffelt, LLB, Public Service Commissioner, Dominion of New Zealand.
- Captain Walter Buchanan-Smith, MC, Senior Resident, Nigeria.
- Charles Walter Hamilton Cochrane, British Resident, Perak, Federated Malay States.
- Alfred John Harding, CBE, Director of Colonial Audit.
- Major Gerald Joseph Keane, DSO, MD, Director of Medical and Sanitary Services, Uganda Protectorate.
- Henry Monck-Mason Moore, Colonial Secretary, Kenya.
- David William Tratman, Assistant Colonial Secretary and Clerk of Councils, Hong Kong.
- Walter Ernest Wait, of the Ceylon Civil Service.
- Thomas Dacre Dunlop, one of His Majesty's Inspectors-General of Consulates.
- Charles Fortescue Garstin, CBE, one of His Majesty's Consuls-General in China.
- Thomas Joseph Harrington, His Majesty's Consul General at Manila.
- Harold Preece Hewins, OBE, Director of the Commercial Intelligence Branch, Central Economic Board, Khartoum.
- Reginald Gerard Leigh, CBE, Assistant Private Secretary to His Majesty's Principal Secretary of State for Foreign Affairs.
- Francis Alfred Oliver, CBE, His Majesty's Consul-General at Hamburg.
- Herbert Chavasse Squires, MD, Director, Khartoum Civil Hospital.
- Hubert Wilberforce Wilson, CBE, His Majesty's Consul-General at Buenos Aires.

=== Order of the Indian Empire ===
==== Knight Commander of the Order of the Indian Empire (KCIE) ====
- Joseph William Bhore, CIE, CBE, Indian Civil Service, lately Joint Secretary, Indian Statutory Commission.
- Arthur Norman Moberly, CIE, Indian Civil Service, lately Vice-President of the Executive Council of the Governor of Bengal.
- Wiliberforce Ross Barker, CB, Chairman of the Public Service Commission.
- Sir Herbert Baker, lately Architect, New Delhi, and Architect of India House, London.
- Samuel Findlater Stewart, CSI, CIE, Secretary, Indian Statutory Commission.

Honorary Knights Commander

- His Highness Maharaja Sri Sri Sri Sri Sri Jigme Wangchuck, CIE, Maharaja of Bhutan.
- His Excellency Shaikh Ahmad Al-Jaber Al-Sabah, CSI, CIE, Ruler of Kuwait, Persian Gulf.

==== Companion of the Order of the Indian Empire (CIE) ====
- Major-General Godfrey Tate, Indian Medical Service, Surgeon-General to the Government of Bengal.
- Gangaram Kaula, Indian Audit and Accounts Service, Controller of Civil Accounts.
- Frederick Burton Pendarves Lory, Indian Educational Service, lately Director of Public Instruction, Bombay.
- Faredun Cursetji Pavry, Chief Engineer, North-Western Railway.
- Frederick Francis Ralph Channer, OBE, Indian Forest, Service, lately Chief Conservator of Forests, United Provinces.
- Lieutenant-Colonel William Jackson Powell, Indian Medical Service, Inspector-General of Prisons, Central Provinces.
- Duncan George Mackenzie, Indian Civil Service, Political Department, lately Administrator, Bharatpur State, Rajputana.
- Robert Rowell Simpson, Chief Inspector of Mines in India.
- Geoffrey Thomas Hirst Bracken, Indian Civil Service, Collector and District Magistrate, Madras.
- Robert Niel Reid, Indian Civil Service, Deputy Commissioner of Jalpaiguri, Bengal.
- Frederick Hale Puckle, Indian Civil Service, Deputy Commissioner, Punjab.
- Benegal Rama Rau, Indian Civil Service, Financial Officer attached to the Indian Statutory Commission.
- George Richard Frederick Tottenham, Indian Civil Service, Deputy Secretary to the Government of India, Army Department.
- Edward William Perry, Indian Civil Service, Assistant Secretary, Indian Statutory Commission.
- Lieutenant-Colonel Hugh Reginald Dutton, Indian Medical Service, lately Principal, Prince of Wales Medical College, Patna, and Superintendent of the Patna Medical College Hospital, Bihar & Orissa.
- Lieutenant-Colonel Henry Herbert McGann, Indian Army, lately Deputy Inspector-General of Military Police in Burma.
- Lieutenant-Colonel John James Thow MacKnight, VD, Assam.
- Colonel Chetwynd Henry Haswell, late Royal Engineers, Secretary to the Chief Commissioner, North-West Frontier Province, Public Works Department.
- Clifford William Ernest Arbuthnot, Indian Service of Engineers, Executive Engineer, Presidency Division, Bombay.
- Khan Bahadur Shaikh Abdul Aziz, OBE, Indian Police Service, Superintendent of Police, Punjab.
- Lawrence Mason, OBE, MC, Indian Forest Service, lately Chief Forest Officer, Andamans.
- Major Stanley Price Williams, Indian Army, Commanding South Waziristan Scouts, North-West Frontier Province.
- Randulph Meverel Statham, Indian Educational Service, Secretary of the Education Committee, Indian Statutory Commission.
- Mariadoss Ratnaswami, Barrister-at-Law, Member of the Public Service Commission, Madras.
- Robert Tor Russell, DSO, lately Architect, New Delhi.
- George Rutherford Dain, MC, Manager, Calcutta Tramways Company.

=== Imperial Order of the Crown of India ===
- Jeannette Hope, Lady Birdwood.

=== Royal Victorian Order ===
==== Knight Grand Cross of the Royal Victorian Order (GCVO) ====
- The Right Honourable Stanley Owen, Baron Buckmaster.
- Lieutenant-General Sir William Pulteney, KCB, KCMG, KCVO, DSO.

==== Knight Commander of the Royal Victorian Order (KCVO) ====
- George Arthur Maurice, Baron Stanmore, CVO.
- Sir Charles Hubert Montgomery, KCMG, CB, CVO.
- Vice-Admiral George Robert Mansell, CBE, MVO.
- Colonel Harold Augustus Wernher.

==== Commander of the Royal Victorian Order (CVO) ====
- Haywood Temple Holmes, CBE, MVO, ISO.
- Evelyn Campbell Shaw, MVO.
- Alexander Ormiston Curie.

==== Member of the Royal Victorian Order, 4th class (MVO) ====
- Clifford Viney Braimbridge, FRCS.
- Major Colin Lindsay Gordon.
- Edgar Stanley Roper.
- Major Vere Elliot Ward-Simpson, MC.

=== Order of the British Empire ===
==== Knight Commander of the Order of the British Empire (KBE) ====
Military Division

- Colonel Henry Davies Foster MacGeagh, CBE, TD, KC, Officer in charge, Military and Air Force Department, Office of the Judge Advocate General, War Office.

Civil Division

- Sir Philip Joseph Hartog, CIE, Chairman, of the Education Committee, Indian Statutory Commission.
- Charles Henry Harper, CMG, OBE, Governor and Commander-in-Chief, Island of Saint Helena.

==== Commander of the Order of the British Empire (CBE) ====
Military Division

Army

- Colonel Ralph Hawtrey Rohde Benson, OBE, (late Royal Artillery), Member of the Ordnance Committee.
- Lieutenant-Colonel and Brevet Colonel Barre Algernon Highmore Goldie, late 86th (East Anglian) (Hertfordshire Yeomanry) Field Brigade, Royal Artillery, Territorial Army.
- Colonel Desmond Murree FitzGerald Hoysted, DSO, (Retired pay), late Royal Engineers), late Chief Technical Examiner for Works Services, War Office.
- Colonel Charles Campbell Todd, CMG. (Retired pay), late Royal Army Pay Corps, and Command Paymaster, The British Troops in Egypt.

Royal Air Force

- Wing Commander Harold Edward Whittingham, MB, ChB, FRFPS(G), MRCP(E), DPH, DTM&H.

Civil Division

- Captain Lionel Frederic Ellis, DSO, MC, General Secretary of the National Council of Social Service. For services in connection with the Coalfields Distress Fund.
- Amy Johnson, in recognition of her outstanding flight to Australia.
- Ada Maria Kirby. For voluntary services in connection with the Royal United Kingdom Beneficent Association.
- Annie Burnett Smith. A popular writer of Scottish fiction under the name of Annie S. Swan. For literary and public services.
- Ernest Woodhouse Smith, DSc, FIC, Honorary Technical Adviser to the Area Gas Supply Committee, Board of Trade.
- Henry Snell, MP, Member of Parliament for East Woolwich since 1922. For political and public services.
- William Straker. General Secretary to the Northumberland Miners' Association.
- Edward Raymond Streat, Secretary of the Manchester Chamber of Commerce.
- Ben Turner, OBE, MP, Secretary for Mines since 1929. Member of Parliament for Batley & Morley 1922–1924 and since 1929.
- Burton Pearson, OBE. Lately Traffic Manager of the Egyptian State Railways.
- Evelyn Charles Donaldson Rawlins, Commercial Counsellor (local rank) at Rome.
- George Frederick Steward, OBE, News Department. Foreign Office.
- Julian Rossi Ashton, formerly President of the Society of Artists in Sydney, and Trustee of the National Art Gallery of New South Wales.
- Gordon Leonard Creasey, For public services in the State of Tasmania.
- Richard Horace Everett, Auditor General, Southern Rhodesia.
- William Grazebrook Layton, Town Clerk of Sydney, State of New South Wales.
- Lieutenant-Colonel Richard Barry Butler, OBE, MC, lately Military Secretary to the Governor of Bengal.
- Sardar Bahadur Sonam Wangfel Laden La, FRCS, Additional Superintendent of Police, Bengal, lately on Special Duty in Tibet.
- Khan Bahadur Mian Abdul Aziz, Member of the Legislative Assembly, Additional District Magistrate, Hoshiarpur, Punjab.
- Claude Woodruff Duncan, Inspector-General of Police, Nigeria.
- Robert Morton Dyer, Chief Manager of the Hong Kong and Whampoa Dock Company Limited. For services to His Majesty's Forces in Hong Kong.
- Cecil John Edmonds, OBE, First Assistant Adviser to the Ministry of Interior, Iraq.
- The Reverend Alexander Garden Fraser, MA, Principal of the Prince of Wales's College, Achimota, Gold Coast.
- Geoffrey Walsh, Commissioner of Customs, Kenya and Uganda.

==== Officer of the Order of the British Empire (OBE) ====
Military Division

Royal Navy

- Lieutenant Commander Sir Archibald Alison, Bt.
- Lieutenant Commander George Ernest Blackmore, DSC.
- Lieutenant Frank Woodgate Lipscomb.

Army

- Major (District Officer) Frederick Ahl, Royal Artillery.
- Captain Edward Beirne, Army Educational Corps.
- Lieutenant-Colonel and Brevet Colonel William Hatton Budge, TD, Dorsetshire Heavy Brigade, Royal Artillery, Territorial Army.
- Captain James Daniel Cameron, Regular Army Reserve of Officers, Staff Quartermaster, Nigeria Regiment, Royal West African Frontier Force.
- Major David Carnegie, 9th (Glasgow Highlanders) Battalion, The Highland Light Infantry, Territorial Army.
- Captain (Quartermaster) George Nicholas Chapman, 3rd (Brecknockshire and Monmouthshire) Battalion, The Monmouthshire Regiment Territorial Army, (Captain, (Retired pay), late The Gloucestershire Regiment.)
- Captain Falconer Craig, MC, 3rd The King's Own Hussars, attached Sudan Defence Force.
- Captain Charley Darby, Transport Officer, Perak Volunteer Corps, Federated Malay States Volunteer Force.
- Temporary Captain William Woodhall Griffith Davies, late Coast Battalion, Royal Engineers.
- Major Maurice Williams Edmunds, 4th Battalion, The Oxfordshire and Buckinghamshire Light Infantry, Territorial Army.
- Major and Brevet Lieutenant-Colonel Richard Robert Forbes, DSO, Half-pay List, Commandant (1st Class) Aldershot Military Prison and Detention Barrack.
- Major (Quartermaster) William Fowler, MC, (Retired pay), Assistant Recruiting Officer, Perth.
- Lieutenant-Colonel (Quartermaster) Frederick Grey, DCM, (Retired pay), late The King's Shropshire Light Infantry.
- The Reverend Percy Wyndham Guinness, DSO, MC, MA, Chaplain to the Forces, 2nd Class, (Retired pay), late Royal Army Chaplains' Department.
- Major John Hare, MD, FRFPS, Royal Army Medical Corps.
- Commissary and Major William Henry King, Queen Victoria's Own Madras Sappers and Miners, Indian Army, Military Engineer Services and Public Works Department, India.
- Captain Duncan Alexander Learmont, Royal Artillery. For services on the Congo-Zambesi Watershed Boundary Commission.
- Major Alfred Gordon-Lee, MC, Officer Commanding, Singapore Royal Artillery Volunteers, Singapore Volunteer Corps, Straits Settlements Volunteer Force.
- Captain Frederick Albert McLaren, (Retired pay), late Royal Army Service Corps. Employed Royal Army Service Corps Record and Pay Office.
- Captain Donald John MacLeod, Royal Tank Corps.
- Commissary and Major Percy Harold Marshall, MBE, India Miscellaneous List. Officer supervisor, General Staff Branch, Army Headquarters, India.
- Captain William Moran, MC, Assistant Paymaster, Royal Army Pay Corps.
- Major William Snowball Mulvey, TD, 108th (Essex) Electrical and Mechanical Company, Royal Engineers, Supplementary Reserve.
- Major and Brevet Lieutenant-Colonel Richard William Oldfield, DSO, MC, Royal Artillery.
- Captain (Quartermaster) William Routley, DCM, (Retired pay), late The Queen's Royal Regiment (West Surrey).
- Lieutenant-Colonel Geoffrey Percival Sanders, DSO, Indian Army, Recruiting Officer, Gorakhpur, India.
- Lieutenant-Colonel and Brevet Colonel James Alfred Seymour, TD, The Army Dental Corps.
- Lieutenant (local Major) John Warner Smith, Regular Army Reserve of Officers, Company Commander, Trans-Jordan Frontier Force. For services during the disturbances in Palestine in August 1929.
- Major (Quartermaster) Edward William Thompson, 5th Battalion, The Northumberland Fusiliers, Territorial Army.
- Captain John Hessell Tiltman, MC, Reserve of Officers, The King's Own Scottish Borderers.
- Lieutenant-Colonel and Brevet Colonel William Bernard Vince, DSO, MC, 7th City of London Regiment, Territorial Army.
- Wilhelmine Walker, RRC, Chief Principal Matron, Queen Alexandra's Imperial Military Nursing Service.
- Major (District Officer) Harry Charles Warton, Royal Artillery.
- Captain Alan Leslie Wilson, MC, Royal Engineers.
- Major Patrick Cornelius Woolner, Royal Engineers (Indian Army).
- Captain Hugh Ransome Stanley Zehnder, Singapore Volunteer Corps, Straits Settlements Volunteer Force.

Royal Air Force

- Wing Commander William Millett.
- Squadron Leader Hugh Leedham.
- Squadron Leader Alan George Bishop, AFC.

Civil Division

- Charles Albert Battie, LRIBA, Assistant Architect, Metropolitan Police Office.
- Adam Louis Beck, Assistant Director of Statistics and Intelligence, Board of Inland Revenue.
- Lieutenant-Colonel William Chaloner, JP, Chairman of the Stockport Local Employment Committee.
- Katharine Clayton. For valuable services to education in Peterborough.
- Matthew Connolly, MBE, Principal, Office of Works.
- Bertie Gibson Crewe, MBE, Principal, Patent Office, Board of Trade.
- John Ashlin Cutforth, MBE, Principal Clerk, Ministry of Pensions.
- Captain Arthur Godfrey Elliott, MC, Secretary, London Hospital.
- Leslie Brian Freeston, Principal, Colonial Office.
- Arthur John Giles, Secretary of the Federation of Grocers' Associations of the United Kingdom, and Member of the Retail Grocers Advisory Sub-Committee of the Empire Marketing Board.
- Robert Hollowell Headley, MBE, LLB, Chief Executive Officer, Military Department, India Office.
- Isabel Mary Heywood, Honorary Secretary, Northern Counties Association for the Blind.
- William Gill Hodgson. For services in Liverpool in connection with the administration of the Health Insurance Scheme.
- James Arthur Bernard Horsley, MIEE, Electrical Inspector of Mines, Mines Department, Board of Trade.
- John Edward Hoyle, General Secretary, of the Incorporated National Federation of Boot-Trades Associations.
- Thomas James Landon, Chief Constable, Metropolitan Police.
- Percy James Langley, MBE, Principal Finance Officer, Ministry of Agriculture and Fisheries.
- Ernest Bright Laycock, Chairman of the Leeds, Harrogate and District War Pensions Committee.
- Major Alfred Appleby Longden, DSO, First Class Intelligence Officer, Department of Overseas Trade. Lately Secretary General of the Exhibition of Italian Art, London.
- Stanley Hugh Mackintosh, DSO, Deputy Divisional Controller, South Western Division, Ministry of Labour.
- Emily MacManus, Matron of Guy's Hospital.
- William John Medlyn, MIEE, Superintending Engineer, Manchester Engineering District, General Post Office.
- Major Edwin George Monro, TD, Member of the Fruit Advisory Committee and Retail Fruiterers Advisory Sub-Committee of the Empire Marketing Board.
- Russell Paton, JP, Organising Secretary, the Royal Infirmary, Edinburgh.
- George Henry Peek, Area Superintendent, Iraq, Imperial War Graves Commission.
- Arthur Pordage, MIFireE, Honorary Secretary of the Institute of Fire Engineers.
- Walter Meakin Roberts, MA, Professor of Mathematics, Royal Military Academy, Woolwich.
- Archibald Havergal Downes-Shaw, Chairman of the Bristol and Wessex Light Aeroplane Club.
- Annie Simonds, MBE, Chairman of the Bradford, Shipley and District War Pensions Committee.
- Frank Stevens, FSA, Controller of the Salisbury, South Wilts and Blackmore Museum.
- Marian Maud Adelaide Ward, Deputy Chief Inspector (Woman), Ministry of Health.
- William Henry Welply, Acting Senior Chief, Inspector, Ministry of Education, Northern Ireland.
- Ernest Grace Westell, Head of the Statistics Section, Board of Education.
- Charles Merllyn Woodford, MBE, Inspector General of Waterguard, Board of Customs and Excise.
- Frank Bennett Young, DSc, Principal Scientific Officer, Admiralty Research Laboratory.
- Thomas Patrick William Barty, Lecturer in Civil Engineering, Gordon College, Khartoum, and Municipal Engineer, Khartoum.
- Edward Cooper, Consul for Concepción, Coronel and Lota.
- Ernest Albert Llewellyn Dalton, MBE, Passport Control Officer, Rotterdam.
- Herbert William Gunningham, Archivist to His Majesty's Embassy at Constantinople.
- George Pycroft, Consul at Barranquilla.
- Frederick Hathaway Teall, Commandant, Suez Canal Police, Port Said.
- Ethel Tawse Jollie, formerly Member of the Legislative Assembly of Southern Rhodesia. For public services.
- Major George Douglas Roberts, Staff Officer, Swaziland Police.
- Dr Alexandrina Matilda MacPhail, Superintendent, Rainy Hospital, Madras.
- Saiyid Muhammad Moinul Haq, Professor of Bihar National College, Patna, and Secretary, Bihar & Orissa Olympic Association.
- Frank Blannerhassett Plunkett, Superintendent, Belgaum Central Prison, Bombay.
- Arthur William Porter, Assistant Superintendent, Burma Frontier Service.
- Khan Bahadur Shaikh Rahim Bakhsh, Punjab Civil Service (Retd.), President, Municipal Committee, Jullundur.
- Charles St. Leger Teyen, ISO, Deputy Secretary, Finance Department, United Provinces.
- Captain Cyril Percy Hancock, MC, Indian Army, Political Department, lately Secretary to the Agent to the Governor-General, Western States of India Agency.
- Angus Leicester Butler, Nominated Unofficial Member of the Legislative Council of Nigeria.
- John Rhodes Dickson, MB, Deputy Surgeon-General and Medical Inspector of Health, Colony of Trinidad and Tobago.
- Major Eric Aldhelm Torlogh Dutton, Private Secretary to the Governor of Kenya.
- Sidney Herbert Fazan, District Officer, Kenya.
- Samuel John Forster, MBE, Unofficial Member, of the Legislative Council, Gambia.
- Arthur Galea, Official Secretary to Head of the Ministry, Malta.
- Alfred George Gottelier, Deputy Inspector-General of Police, Ceylon.
- Thomas Meade Kelshall, Elected Member of the Legislative Council of Trinidad and Tobago.
- Geoffrey Charles Kitching, Administrative Inspector, Ministry of Interior, Iraq.
- Captain Ernest Benjamin Leese, Travelling Commissioner, Gambia.
- William James Miller, District Officer, Nablus, For services during the disturbances in Palestine in August 1929.
- Arthur Rea Morgan, Senior, Agricultural Officer, Uganda Protectorate.
- James Munro, MC, Deputy Superintendent, Department of Police and Prisons, Palestine. For services during the disturbances in Palestine in August 1929.
- Captain Clinton Austin Reed, VD, Governor of Glendairey Prison, Barbados.
- Major and Brevet Lieutenant-Colonel William Clayton Smales, DSO, Royal Army Medical Corps, lately Medical Officer of Health, Gibraltar.
- George Jameson Swann, Traffic Manager, Port Directorate, Basrah, Ministry of Finance, Iraq.
- Robert Andre Llewellyn Warneford, formerly Member of the Executive and Legislative Councils, Leeward Islands.

Honorary Officers

- Abdul Al, Medical Officer, Hebron. For services during the disturbances in Palestine in August 1929.
- Suleiman Saleem, Medical Officer, Jerusalem District. For services during the disturbances in Palestine in August 1929.

==== Member of the Order of the British Empire (MBE) ====
Military Division

Royal Navy

- Lieutenant Henry Melville.
- Paymaster Lieutenant (S) Ernest Richard Darby.
- Captain Arthur Hurford, Royal Marines (Retd.)
- Senior Chief Officer (SSS) Arthur John Stubbs.
- Chief Officer (SSS) William Chalmers.
- Warrant Engineer William John George Jenkins.

Army

- Deputy Commissary and Captain Frederick William Addinall, India Miscellaneous List, Superintendent, General Staff Branch, Army Headquarters, India.
- Captain Mohammad Akbar Khan, Probyn's Horse (5th King Edward's Own Lancers), Indian Army.
- Warrant Officer Class II, Battery Sergeant-Major George Bilney, 168th (City of London) Battery, 53rd (City of London) Anti-Aircraft Brigade, Royal Artillery (Territorial Army).
- Warrant Officer Class 1, 1st Class Staff Sergeant-Major Peter Richard Blyth, Royal Army Service Corps.
- Regimental Sergeant-Major Harry Boxall, Royal Engineers (King George's Own Bengal Sappers and Miners, Indian Army).
- Warrant Officer Class I, Regimental Sergeant-Major James Bryant, late 1st Battalion, Grenadier Guards.
- Warrant Officer Class I, Sergeant-Major Charles Edward Bull, DCM, Royal Army Medical Corps.
- Warrant Officer Class II, Staff Quartermaster Sergeant William Frank Cain, 44th (Home Counties) Divisional Train, Royal Army Service Corps (Territorial Army).
- The Reverend John Calder, Chaplain, to the Forces (4th Class), Royal Army Chaplains' Department, Territorial Army.
- Warrant Officer Class I, Staff Sergeant-Major Charles Edward George Albert Charmbury, Royal Army Service Corps.
- Warrant Officer Class I, Staff Sergeant-Major Alfred Charles Clark, Royal Army Pay Corps.
- Regimental Quartermaster Sergeant Patrick Connell, 4th Battalion, The Northumberland Fusiliers (Territorial Army).
- Captain (Quartermaster) Frederick Dale, MC, 14th Battalion, the London Regiment (London Scottish) (Territorial Army).
- Lieutenant (Quartermaster) Percy Dare, 2nd Battalion, The Buffs (East Kent Regiment).
- Warrant Officer Class II, Company Sergeant Major James Deasy, 6/7th Battalion, The Manchester Regiment (Territorial Army).
- Warrant Officer Class II, Engineer Clerk Quartermaster Sergeant Harry Torrens Dibley, Royal Engineers.
- Warrant Officer Class II, Squadron Sergeant Major William Durham, MM, The Queen's Bays (2nd Dragoon Guards).
- Warrant Officer Class I Sergeant Major Henry Elliott, Royal Army Medical Corps.
- Commissary and Major Oswald Miles Godbold, Indian Army Ordnance Corps, Technical Officer Master-General of the Ordnance Branch, Army Headquarters, India.
- Regimental Sergeant Major Malcolm Lees Gorman, Indian Unattached List. Senior Physical Training Instructor. Prince of Wales's Royal Indian Military College, India.
- Lieutenant (Inspector of Royal Engineer Machinery) William John Harris, Royal Engineers.
- Warrant Officer Class I, Regimental Sergeant Major Joseph Holdsworth, Depot, The West Yorkshire Regiment (The Prince of Wales's Own).
- Lieutenant Henry Richard Holland, Reserve of Officers, Royal Corps of Signals.
- Warrant Officer Class II, Regimental Quartermaster-Sergeant Herbert John Holland, 2nd Battalion, The South Staffordshire Regiment.
- Warrant Officer Class I, Staff Sergeant Major Stephen Holman, Royal Army Pay Corps.
- Captain Leonard Wyndham Daly Holmes & Court, Officer Commanding, Antigua Defence Force, Leeward Islands.
- Warrant Officer Class I, 1st. Class Staff Sergeant Major Edward Victor Howes, MM, Royal Army Service Corps.
- Lieutenant Leslie Oliver Jolliffe, Royal Army Service Corps.
- Warrant Officer Class I, Conductor Ernest Henry Kember, Royal Army Ordnance Corps.
- Local Regimental Sergeant Major James Lamb, late Superintending Clerk Q Branch, Iraq Levies.
- Bandmaster Thomas McDonald, 4th Battalion, The King's Own Scottish Borderers (Territorial Army).
- Conductor Fred McEwan, Indian Unattached List, Indian Corps of Clerks, Indian Army.
- Captain Charles Edward MacGuckin, Military Farms Department, India.
- Captain Alexander Henley MacGuffie, Royal Engineers (Indian Army). Technical Officer (Works), Engineer-in-Chief's Branch, Army Headquarters, India.
- Warrant Officer Class I, Regimental Sergeant Major James Fred McLaurin, Depot, The Queen's Own Cameron Highlanders.
- Warrant Officer Class I, Regimental Sergeant Major Andrew Aitchison Mack, late Royal Engineers, Postal Section.
- Captain Stanley Maddex, 8th Battalion, The Middlesex Regiment (Duke of Cambridge's Own) (Territorial Army).
- Warrant Officer Class II, Staff Quartermaster Sergeant John Parry, Royal Army Service Corps (Territorial Army).
- Warrant Officer Class I, Regimental Sergeant Major Albert Edward Pearce, 1st Battalion, The Manchester Regiment.
- Major (Quartermaster) William Seaton, MC, DCM, 6th Battalion, The Sherwood Foresters (Nottinghamshire and Derbyshire Regiment) (Territorial Army).
- Lieutenant (Local Captain) Horace Edmund Sharpe, Army Educational Corps.
- Warrant Officer Class II, Garrison Quartermaster Sergeant Victor Edwin Smith, Staff of the Army, Aldershot.
- Lieutenant Reginald William Stephens, 1st Battalion, The Somerset Light Infantry (Prince Albert's).
- Warrant Officer Class I, Artificer Sergeant Major John Sutch, Royal Artillery.
- Lieutenant Frederick Horace Swyer, Army Educational Corps.
- The Reverend Guy William Teale, Chaplain to the Forces, 4th Class, Royal Army Chaplains Department, Territorial Army.
- Warrant Officer Class I, Regimental Sergeant Major Sidney John Thompson, 2nd Battalion, The East Surrey Regiment.
- Assistant Commissary and Lieutenant William Henry Tioehurst, MM, Indian Unattached List, Indian Corps of Clerks, Indian Army.
- Lieutenant (Quartermaster) Richard Charles Vacher, Royal Army Service Corps.
- Warrant Officer Class II, Regimental Quartermaster Sergeant Ernest John Vincent, The King's Royal Rifle Corps, attached Staff College, Camberley.
- Warrant Officer Class II, Battery Sergeant Major George Frederick Waters, Royal Artillery (Territorial Army).
- Warrant Officer Class I, Sergeant Major Alfred George Wilde, Royal Horse Artillery.
- Risaldar Muhammad Yasin Khan, 8th King George's Own Light Cavalry, Indian Army.

Honorary Members

- Rais Shoeb Bzadoo, Trans-Jordan Frontier Force. For services during the disturbances in Palestine in August 1929.
- Mulazim Amien Ezzeddin, Trans-Jordan Frontier Force. For services during the disturbances in Palestine in August 1929.

Royal Air Force

- Flight Lieutenant Sidney James Bailey.
- No. 472 Sergeant-Major, 1st Class, Alfred Box.
- No. 798 Sergeant-Major, 1st Class, Frank Lamdin.
- No. 7677 Sergeant-Major, 1st Class, Laurence Richard Fears.

Civil Division

- Henry Walter Acres, Staff Officer (Librarian), Board of Trade.
- Frederick Adams, Senior Staff Officer, Ministry of Health.
- John Maurice Adams, Staff Clerk, War Office.
- Harold Arthur Agnew, Higher Executive Officer, Ministry of Labour, Northern Ireland.
- Louisa Bessie Violet Bolton, LLA, Head Mistress of the Burghley Senior Girls' School, St. Pancras.
- Clement Bristow, DCM, Superintendent, West Sussex County Constabulary.
- George William Brownell, Superintending Officer, Ministry of Home Affairs, Northern Ireland.
- James Carson, Superintendent, Rossie Reformatory School, Angus.
- Colin Grant Croall, Chairman of the Northampton, Wolverton and District War Pensions Committee.
- Conrad Hughes Davies, MC, Senior Intelligence Officer, Department of Overseas Trade.
- William Davis, Superintendent (Telegraphs), London Postal Service, General Post Office.
- William Deacon, Superintendent, Hampshire Constabulary.
- Henry James Ernest Easton, Staff Officer, Patent Office (Manchester), Board of Trade.
- Albert Endicott, FSI, Superintending Estate Surveyor, Office of Works.
- Percy Haigh, Clerk, Higher Grade, Board of Inland Revenue.
- William James Charles Hammond, Shop Manager, Royal Naval Torpedo Factory, Greenock.
- Ernest William Henry Harbour, Principal Clerk, Ministry of Pensions.
- David Hardie, Superintendent of the Admiralty Chart Establishment, Cricklewood.
- John Haworth, FIC, FCS, General Manager of the Sewage Disposal Department, and Chief Chemist and Water Examiner, Sheffield Corporation.
- Ellen Mathers Hough, Higher Executive Officer, Ministry of Pensions.
- William Charles Hannaford Hutchins, Assistant Accountant, Board of Education.
- Alfred James, Chief Timber Inspector under the Director of Contracts, Admiralty.
- Henry Johnson, FSIA, FRSI, Chief Sanitary Inspector, Borough of Wimbledon.
- George Shepherd Shepherd-Jones, Accountant, Accountant and Comptroller General's Office, Board of Customs and Excise.
- Michael Augustine Kent, MC, Handicraft Instructor, Elbow Lane Practical Instruction Centre, Leicester.
- William Charles Letts, Principal Clerk, Ministry of Pensions.
- John Armour McGilvray, Staff Officer, Ministry of Agriculture and Fisheries.
- Robert John Mackrell, Chief Examiner, Estate Duty Branch, Ministry of Finance, Northern Ireland.
- John Main, FGS, FEIS. For public services, in Glasgow and district.
- Catherine Gow Milne, Clerical Officer, Home Office. Until recently Secretary Shorthand Typist to the Ceremonial Secretary.
- Sebastian Elliot Moorcroft, Chief Realisation Clerk, Clearing Office, (Enemy Debts), Board of Trade.
- Ernest Edward Parker, Staff Officer, Exchequer, Edinburgh.
- John Phillips, Chairman of the Monmouthshire War Pensions Committee.
- Lawrence George Polden, Accountant, Finance Department, Ministry of Labour.
- Alfred Henry Marmaduke Purse. For services in connection with Health Insurance Secretary to the Welsh Joint Insurance (Pricing) Committee.
- William Robert Rae, Superintendent, Edinburgh City Police.
- Councillor Mona Bryant Robinson, JP, Headmistress, Mudeford Church of England School, Christchurch, Hampshire, Mayor of Christchurch 1928–29, and now deputy mayor.
- William George Sankey, Grade I Clerk, Inspection Department, Woolwich Arsenal.
- Minna Florence Schirges, Clerk, Higher Grade, Establishments Department, Ministry of Labour.
- William Whittaker Siddell, Deputy Chief Collector, Board of Inland Revenue.
- Frank Singer, Staff Officer, Board of Inland Revenue.
- William Percy Smart, Senior Staff Officer, Ministry of Agriculture and Fisheries.
- Mildred Kate Spencer, Higher Clerical Officer, Foreign Office.
- Andrew Walker, Member of the Retail Fruiterer's Advisory Sub-Committee of the Empire Marketing Board.
- Thomas James Welsh, Assistant Surveyor of Prisons, Home Office.
- Ethel Willans, Principal, Women's Advisory Staff, Gas, Light & Coke Co. For services in connection with Empire Marketing.
- Benjamin Williams, Juvenile Employment (Education) Officer for the City of Cardiff.
- Frederick George Allen Williams, Manager, City Employment Exchange, Ministry of Labour.
- Thomas Wilson, Deputy Keeper of the Old and New Palaces of Westminster, Superintendent of Works, Office of Works.
- Arthur Winstanley, DSc, Junior Inspector of Mines, Mines Department, Board of Trade.
- Elizabeth Mary Wyatt, County Superintendent, East Sussex County Nursing Federation.
- Thomas James Coleman, Superintendent, Traffic Department, Cairo City Police.
- Ruth Cooper, Chief Clerk at the Vice-Consulate at Fez.
- Percy Coriat, DCM, Assistant District Commissioner, Sudan Political Service.
- Frank Nutter Cox, His Majesty's Consul at Costa Rica.
- Cyril Henry Haines, Assistant British Agent to the Anglo-Mexican Revolutionary Claims Commission.
- William Edmund Hampton, Superintendent of Quays, Egyptian Ports and Lighthouses Administration.
- Luther Martin, Chief Clerk, Inspector-General's Office, Egyptian Ministry of War and Marine.
- Arthur Stafford Oakley, Assistant District Commissioner, Sudan Political Service.
- Ellen Leahy. For philanthropic services in the State of New South Wales.
- Diwan Bahadur Srinivasa Aravamudu Ayyangar, Pleader, Vice-Chairman of the Residency Bazars Committee, Hyderabad.
- Gerald George Bladen-Taylor, Imperial Secretariat Service, Superintendent, Foreign and Political Department, Government of India.
- William Edmund Betting, Executive Officer, Improvement Trust, Lucknow, United Provinces.
- William Arthur Brito, Secretary to the Commissioner of Excise, Madras.
- William D'Almeida, Imperial Secretariat Service, Superintendent, Office of the Indian Statutory Commission.
- Owen Richard Cowley Freeman, Indian Medical Department, Deputy Superintendent, Central Mental Hospital.
- Captain Dinshaw Sorabji Khory, British India Steam Navigation Company Limited, Karachi.
- Rai Sahib Lala Nathu Rain, Punjab Civil Service, City Magistrate, Lahore.
- Albert John Parker, Chief Clerical Assistant, Indian Statutory Commission.
- Joseph Murray Richardson, Indian Medical Department, Superintendent of the Juvenile Jail, Narsinghpur, Central Provinces.
- George Edward Biddle, Superintendent of Prisons, Sierra Leone .
- Ethel Marion Blyth, Controller of Female Staffs, Office of the Crown Agents for the Colonies.
- William Ward Brew, Member of the Cape Coast Town Council, Gold Coast. For public services.
- Thomas Henry Brown, Postmaster, Jaffa. For services during the disturbances in Palestine in August 1929.
- Edwin George Bryant, DCM, Assistant Superintendent of Police, Palestine. For services during the disturbances in Palestine in August 1929.
- Patrick Henry Burns, Superintendent of Telegraphs, Bahamas.
- Lena Augusta Chapman, Principal of Hillwood College, Kandy, Ceylon.
- Herbert Thomas Clark, Inspector of Schools, Singapore.
- Herbert Harold Heath, Colonial Postmaster, Barbados.
- Henry Walter Jack Economic Botanist, Agricultural Department, Straits Settlements and Federated Malay States.
- Ellen Menendez Johnson, Assistant Postmaster, Bahamas.
- Lily Morris, senior Mistress, King's College, Hong Kong.
- Gertrude Nettleship. For missionary services in Ceylon.
- Margaret Katherine Packer. For social services in Barbados.
- Horace George Davie Rooke, lately Chief Locust Officer, Ministry of Irrigation and Agriculture, Iraq.
- Arumugam Sellamuttu. For philanthropic services in Ceylon.
- Dorothy Frances Vibert Jackson. For services in the promotion of the Girl Guide movement in Grenada, Windward Islands.

Honorary Members

- Barukh Binah, Administrative Officer, Haifa. For services during the disturbances in Palestine in August 1929.
- Haj Abdul Raheem el Nabulsi, Acting Mayor of Nablus. For services during the disturbances in Palestine in August 1929.
- Michael Makhlouf, Surveyor, Department of Customs, Excise and Trade, Palestine.
- Solomon Schieff, Acting Divisional Inspector, Tel Aviv. For services during the disturbances in Palestine in August 1929.

=== Order of the Companions of Honour (CH) ===
- Margaret McMillan, CBE. For services to the Nursery School Movement.

=== Kaisar-i-Hind Medal ===
- Eleanor Isabel Dodson, in charge of the Church Missionary Society Zenana Hospital, Multan, Punjab.
- Alice Lucretia Ernst, MD, (Philadelphia, USA), in charge of the Ackerman Hoyt Memorial Hospital at Jhansi, United Provinces.
- Hilda Gould, Head of St. Stephen's Community, Delhi.
- Edith, Lady Heald, MBE, Rangoon, Burma.
- Kathleen Anna Dorothy, Lady Jackson, Bombay.
- Dhanbai, Lady Cowasji Jehangir (Senior), Bombay.
- Margaret Mitchell Paterson, Scotch Mission Hospital, Sialkot.
- John Edward Sandilands, MC, MD, DPH, lately Health Officer, Bombay Municipality, Bombay.
- Hassan Suhrawardy, OBE, MD, DPH, FRCS, Chief Medical Officer, Eastern Bengal Railway, Bengal.
- Blanche Margaret Tweddle, Superintendent, Wesleyan Mission Industrial School, Ikkadu, Tiruvallur, Madras.

=== Medal of the Order of the British Empire ===
For Meritorious Service.

Military Division

Royal Navy

- William Frederick Amos Betty, Chief Petty Officer, 238518, (HM Submarine L.12).
- Frederick John Jolly, Chief Petty Officer, J.7719, (HM Submarine L.12).
- Edward William Pope, Supply Petty Officer, M.31229, (HMS Triad).
- Leonard Hammett, Able Seaman, J.54919, (HMS Devonshire).
- Duncan Scott Smith, Sick Berth Attendant, M.36565, (HMS Devonshire).

Army

- No. 1852829 Engineer Clerk Staff-Sergeant William Richard Beale, Royal Engineers, Military Operations and Intelligence Directorate, War Office.
- No. 2968492 Pipe Major James Carswell, 9th Battalion, The Argyll and Sutherland Highlanders (Princess Louise's) Territorial Army.
- No. 1031484 Staff-Sergeant-Artificer Joseph Eric Giddens, Royal Artillery Mechanical Transport Branch, Military College of Science.
- No. 2307806 Company-Quartermaster-Sergeant Charles William Goodridge, MM, Royal Corps of Signals.
- No. 2316259 Corporal George Frederick Marshall, Royal Corps of Signals.
- No. 1026438 Quartermaster-Sergeant Walter Usherwood, 9th Field Brigade, Royal Artillery.
- Shawish (Sergeant) Mansur Abdullah, Cavalry and Mounted Rifles, Sudan Defence Force.
- Shawish (Sergeant) Abdullah El Khidr, Veterinary Department, Sudan Defence Force.

Royal Air Force

- No. 358497 Leading Aircraftman Arthur Horace Street.
- No. 2172 Orderly Room-Sergeant Fazal Ahmed, Aden Protectorate Levies.

Civil Division

- William Charles Black, No. 197 Sergeant, Palestine Police.
- Anthony Frederick Braganza, Public Works Department Head Clerk to the Superintending Engineer, Deccan Irrigation Circle, Poona, Bombay, India.
- Alfred Clark, Engine Driver, Sudan Government Railways.
- William Henry Edmonds, Office Keeper, Headquarters, Southern Command, Salisbury.
- Alfred Lampitt, Locomotive Inspector, Sudan Government Railways.
- Neville Mudie McLeod, Running Shed Foreman, Tundla, United Provinces, India.
- Thomas White Stone, Class I, Chief Officer at Parkhurst Convict Prison.
- Mina Adina Williams, Head Nurse, Pogson Hospital, St. Christopher, Leeward Islands.
- Mohammed Effendi Amin, Police Officer, Sudan Police.
- Mohammed Effendi Onur, Muawin of Arabs, Sudan.
- Nawai Toto, No. 201 Onbashi (Corporal) Kordofan Province Police, Sudan.
- Thakur Raghuraj Singh Rawal, Excise Inspector, United Provinces, India.
- Mahomed Khan Chotekhan, Excise Service. Jamadar at Nandurbar, West Khandesh, Bombay, India.
- Rajab el Zarbately, No. 437 Police Constable, Palestine Police.

=== Companion of the Imperial Service Order (ISO) ===
Home Civil Service

- William Clarence Barber, MBE, Head of the Establishment Section, Board of Education.
- James Arthur Chamberlain, Senior Staff Clerk, Ministry of Labour.
- Henry Richard Cornfield, Senior Auditor, Exchequer and Audit Department.
- William Lawe Gane, Senior Examiner, Estate Duty Office, Board of Inland Revenue.
- Ernest Stephen Jones, OBE, Principal of the Accounts Branch and Chief Clerk, National Debt Office.
- Walter Herbert Judson, Assistant Director, of Contracts, Admiralty.
- Robert Squire Langford, Senior Staff Officer, Ministry of Agriculture and Fisheries.
- James Mahood, Principal Clerk, Paymaster General's Office.
- Robert Anstruther Moad, Superintending Clerk, General Register Office, Ministry of Health.
- Alexander Oliphant, Assistant Establishment Officer and Superintendent of Statistics, Department of Health for Scotland.
- Percival Fitzgerald Pyle, Chief Clerk, Treasury.
- Sidney Charles Ratcliff, MA, Assistant Keeper, First Class, Public Record Office.
- Percy Baldwin Renshaw, Chief Enquiry Officer, Board of Customs and Excise.
- Percy Christopher Rice, OBE, Chief Establishment Officer and Finance Officer, Department of Overseas Trade.
- William Campbell Sansom, MBE, Senior Staff Clerk, War Office.
- Alfred John Waldegrave, MBE, Deputy Controller and Accountant General, General Post Office.
- James Kyd Young, Chief Clerk in the Crown Office, Edinburgh.

Dominions

- Charles Arrowsmith Bernays, Clerk of the Legislative Assembly, State of Queensland.
- Joshua William Ferguson, Secretary and Commercial Officer, Office of the Agent General in London for the State of New South Wales.
- Philip Samuel Messent, Secretary for Lands, State of South Australia.

Indian Civil Services

- Clarence Francis George, Indian Audit and Accounts Service, Assistant Director of Commercial Audit.
- Frederick Hewitt, Inspector of Stores, India Store Department, London.
- David Keiller, Head Laboratory Assistant, Imperial Institute of Veterinary Research, Muktesar, United Provinces.
- Hugh Maurice LaFrenais, Indian Medical Department, on duty at the Haffkine Institute, Bombay.
- Gilbert McGuire, Indian Medical Department, Punjab.
- John William McKay, Registrar, Bengal Legislative Council and Legislative Department, Bengal.
- Frederick George Pettifer, Bihar & Orissa Police Service.
- Lala Ram Chander Agarwal, Head Clerk, Office of the Assistant Director, Supply and Transport, Peshawar District.
- Rai Bahadur Ram Saran Das, Special Manager, Court of Wards, United Provinces.
- Henry Theodore, Manager, Office of the Surgeon-General, Madras.

Colonies, Protectorates, &c.

- Durand Victor Altendorff, Deputy Inspector-General of Police, Ceylon.
- Paul Azu, Secretariat Assistant, Gold Coast.
- Rudolf Fernandez, MBE, formerly superintendent in the Office of the High Commissioner for Iraq.
- Duncan Laurence Lewis Feurtado, lately Assistant Director of Public Works, Jamaica.
- Joseph Claude Gaffiero, Engineer, Public Works Department, Cyprus.
- Hugh Houston Hutchings, Commissioner of Montserrat, Leeward Islands.
- James Maddy Lumley, Deputy Commissioner of Police, Kenya.
- Colonel George Herbert May, VD, Inspector-General of Constabulary and Commandant of Local Forces, Colony of Trinidad and Tobago.
- Gustave Savy, lately Inspector of Police, Seychelles.
- Dudley Henry Semper, Magistrate and Coroner, Presidency of Saint Christopher and Nevis, Leeward Islands.
- John Henry Cheetham Smart, African Assistant Colonial Secretary, Sierra Leone.

=== Imperial Service Medal ===
- Babu Haridas Dass, late Viceman, General Workshop, His Majesty's Mint, Calcutta.
- Usman Khan Ahmed Khan, late Gatekeeper and General Custodian of the Public Works Department, Secretariat Building, Bombay.

=== Royal Red Cross (RRC) ===
First Class

- Agatha Mary Phillips, ARRC, Principal Matron, Queen Alexandra's Imperial Military Nursing Service, in recognition of the exceptional devotion to duty displayed by her in Military Hospitals.
- Katherine Christie Watt, Matron, Princess Mary's Royal Air Force Nursing Service. In recognition of exceptional devotion and competency displayed in Royal Air Force hospitals at home and in Iraq.

Second Class

- Esther Wilson Hunter, Sister, Princess Mary's Royal Air Force Nursing Service. In recognition of special devotion and competency in the performance of nursing duties in the Palestine General Hospital, Sarafand.

=== Air Force Cross (AFC) ===
- Squadron Leader Alan Lees.
- Flight Lieutenant Henry George Watts Lock, DFC.
- Flight Lieutenant Alfred Randles Wardle.

==== Bar to the Air Force Cross ====
- Squadron Leader Augustus Henry Orlebar, AFC.
