= Epidemiology in Relation to Air Travel =

Book about travel medicine

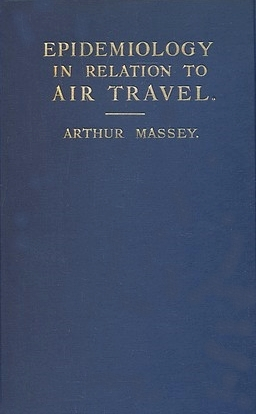
- Author: Arthur Massey
- Language: English
- Subject: Medicine
- Published: 1933
- Publisher: H. K. Lewis & Co. Ltd.
- Publication place: United Kingdom
- Pages: 59

Epidemiology in Relation to Air Travel is a book by Arthur Massey, the medical officer of health of Coventry, published by H. K. Lewis & Co. in 1933. By comparing the travel times of journeys by ship to those of travelling by air, he demonstrated how the quarantinable diseases plague, cholera, yellow fever and smallpox, could arrive in the UK in the early 1930s.

Massey noted that travelling by aeroplane, from countries where major infectious diseases were common, to countries where those diseases were rare or non-existent, risked spreading those diseases during the incubation period.

It was noted by Air Commodore H. E. Whittingham and in The Indian Medical Gazette to be one of the earliest works of its kind.

== Publication ==
Epidemiology in Relation to Air Travel was written by the Coventry-based medical officer of health Arthur Massey, and published by H. K. Lewis and Co. Ltd. in 1933, when the topic was relatively new, and in the year after the International Sanitary Convention for Aerial Navigation was drawn up. It has 59 pages and five maps.

== Synopsis ==
The book deals briefly with the danger of spreading infectious disease via aircraft as flight times in the 1930s brought West Africa and India within a few days' travel of England and Europe, and the United States more speedily reached from Central and South America. Massey noted that travelling by aeroplane, from countries where major infectious diseases were common, to countries where those diseases were rare or non-existent, risked spreading those diseases during the incubation period. It was aimed at informing health authorities and offered solutions for prevention. By comparing the travel times of travelling by ship to those of travelling by air, he demonstrated how particularly four quarantinable diseases (plague, cholera, yellow fever and smallpox), could arrive in the UK in the early 1930s. He made particular note of mosquitoes and the risk of transferring yellow fever. In the preface, he wrote:

Speedier transport is equivalent to a reduction of distance. This was shown when steamships superseded sailing vessels. It is demonstrated more forcibly today by the events of civil aviation. Among the momentous advantages, fraternal and commercial, born of this development, there is the disadvantage that countries affected by certain major infectious diseases are brought nearer to countries which ordinarily enjoy freedom therefrom.

The book addresses disinfection and sanitation in aircraft, and the prevention of aircraft transmitting plague, cholera, malaria, relapsing fever and smallpox. How to dispose of excrement and implement procedures to avoid carrying disease bearing insects are included in the book.

== Response ==
The book was noted by Air Commodore H. E. Whittingham, to be one of the earliest works of its kind, along with that of Air Commodore David Munro, who wrote on the subject in 1925. The Indian Medical Gazette noted it to be a new field, but disagreed with some of the maps showing plague and cholera distribution in Asia, and noted some minor errors in the text.
