= Arthur Massey =

Arthur Massey may refer to:

- Arthur Massey (doctor) (1894–1980), British medical doctor and author
- Arthur Massey (composer) (1861–1950), Australian organist, teacher and composer

== See also ==
- Arthur Massé (1894–1972), Canadian forest engineer, land surveyor and politician
- Arthur Massey Berry (1888–1970), Canadian bush pilot
