= Denys Bray =

British colonial civil servant and etymologist (1875–1951)

Bray in 1930.

Sir Denys de Saumarez Bray, KCSI, KCIE, CBE (29 November 1875 – 19 November 1951) was an etymologist and British colonial civil servant in the Empire of India, who served as Secretary of the Foreign Department of the Government of India.

Bray's publications evidence his deep understanding of the Brahui language, and his later work on Shakespeare re-arranged the much disputed order of Shakespeare's Sonnets on the basis of the discovery of a hitherto unexpected rhyme-link or word-link, joining sonnet to sonnet to form an orderly and smoothly flowing whole. This later work culminated with the publication of The Original Order of Shakespeare's Sonnets.

== Early life ==
Bray was born in Aberdeen when his father, the Rev. Thomas William Bray, a Church of England cleric, was serving a cure in the Scottish Episcopal Church. He grew up there and in England and Germany, and was educated at a Realgymnasium in Stuttgart, Blundell's School in Tiverton, and at Balliol College, Oxford (where he was Taylorian Scholar).

== Diplomatic career ==
Bray passed the Indian Civil Service examination of 1898, and served in the Punjab, Khyber Pakhtunkhwa, and Baluchistan.

After serving as Deputy Secretary of the Foreign Department at New Delhi for four years. Bray was appointed Secretary in 1920, and filled the position with distinction for nearly a decade. He had a large share in shaping the treaty with Afghanistan negotiated at Kabul by Sir Henry Dobbs in 1921 (which amended the Treaty of Rawalpindi, agreed originally in August 1919, and reaffirmed Britain's recognition of Afghanistan's complete independence, and restored to the Afghans the privilege of importing munitions through India).

King Amanullah’s impatient forcing of Western ways on his people after visiting Europe in 1928 led to a revolt, and grave danger to the inmates of the British Legation at Kabul. Early in 1929, Bray was responsible for the plans for the evacuation by air (a novel method at that time) of the women and children, and then of the Minister, Sir Francis Humphreys, and his staff as part of the Kabul Airlift.

On leaving India in 1930, Bray was appointed a member of the Council of the Secretary of State for the India Office, which was transformed before the completion of his seven years into a body of advisers. Throughout the time, he was on the Indian delegation to the annual Assembly of the League of Nations. Bray also represented India at the international broadcasting conference in 1936, at the diplomatic conference on terrorism in 1937, and in the mission to Spain on refugee relief in 1938.

== Honours ==
Bray was appointed a Companion of the Order of the Indian Empire (CIE) in the 1917 Birthday Honours, a Commander of the Order of the British Empire (CBE) in the 1919 Birthday Honours, and a Companion of the Order of the Star of India (CSI) in the 1922 New Year Honours.

He was promoted to Knight Commander of the Order of the Indian Empire (KCIE) in the 1925 Birthday Honours, and to Knight Commander of the Order of the Star of India (KCSI) in the 1930 Birthday Honours.

== Etymological research and publications ==
Bray’s publications included:

- 1909: The Brahui Language, Part I. Calcutta: Superintendent Government Printing (Reprinted 1977–78, Quetta: Brahui Academy, Bib ID 1174990).
- 1913: Life History of a Brahui. London: Royal Asiatic Society (Reprinted 1977, Karachi: Royal Book Co., Bib ID 2902021).
- 1925: The Original Order of Shakespeare’s Sonnets. London: Methuen, Bib ID 2535453.
- 1934: The Brāhūī Language. Part II. The Brāhūī problem. Part III. Etymological vocabulary. Delhi: Manager of Publications.

== Sources ==
- Obituary of Sir Denys Bray, The Times, Wednesday, Nov 21, 1951 (pg. 8; Issue 52164; col E).
- The India list and India Office list, 1905
