= Alexandrina Matilda MacPhail =

Scottish doctor and missionary to India

Dr Alexandrina Matilda MacPhail OBE, KHM
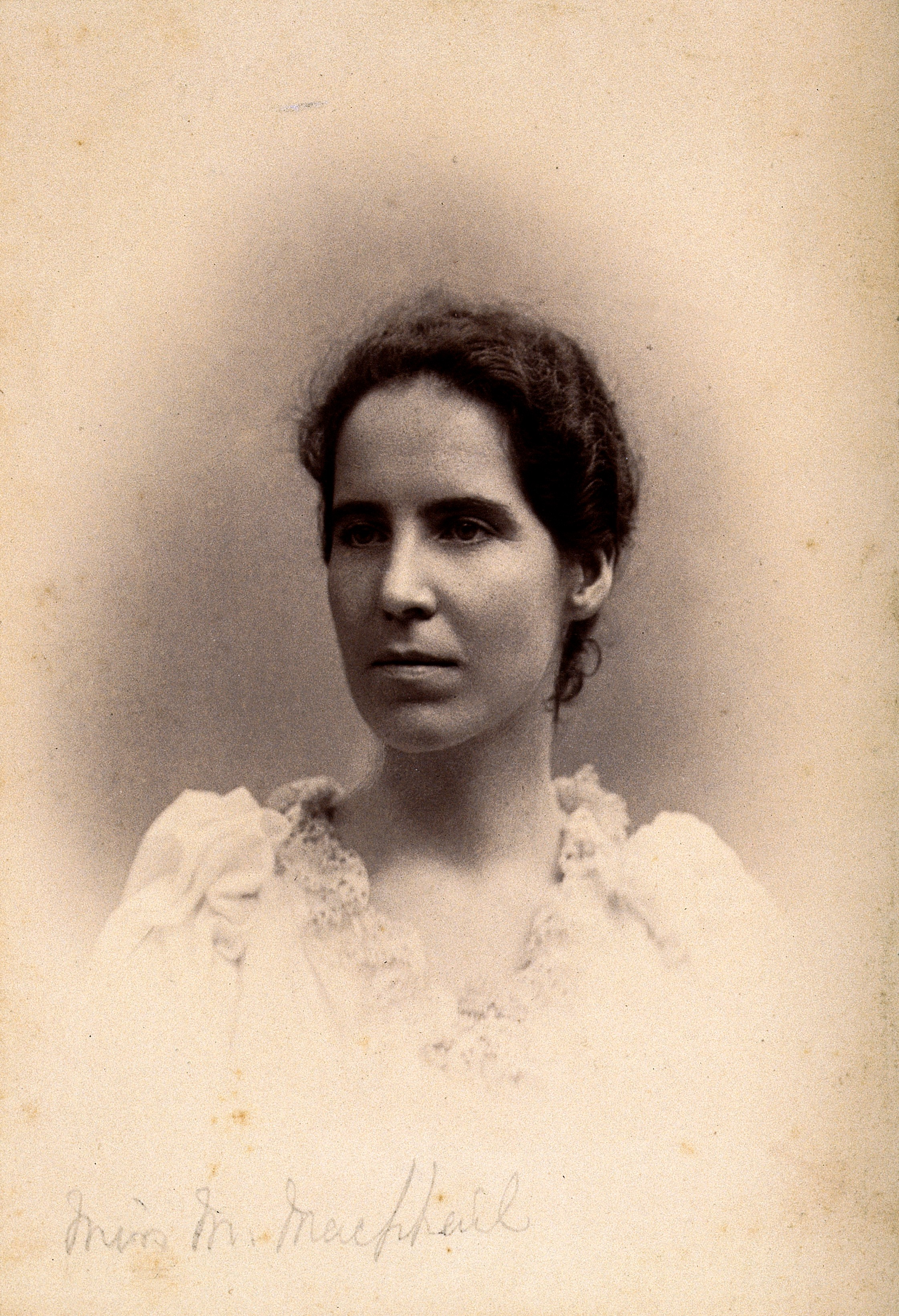
- by Fréd Ahrlé & Co.
- Born: 3 June 1860; Isle of Skye
- Died: 6 November 1946 (aged 86); Edinburgh
- Education: London Medical School for Women
- Occupations: Doctor, Missionary

Alexandrina Matilda MacPhail, OBE (3 June 1860 – 6 November 1946) was a Scottish doctor who graduated from the London School of Medicine for Women. In 1887, she became a missionary and doctor in India, where she founded what would become a large hospital in Madras. During the First World War, she also worked for the Scottish Women's Hospitals for Foreign Service as a doctor in Serbia and France.

== Early life and education ==
Alexandrina McPhail was born in Knock, Sleat, on the Isle of Skye in June 1860. She was the daughter of Reverend John Sinclair MacPhail, first Free Church minister of Sleat, and later, minister of the United Free Church; and Jessie Reid (née Finlayson).

MacPhail attended the London School of Medicine for Women and graduated in 1887.

== Career ==
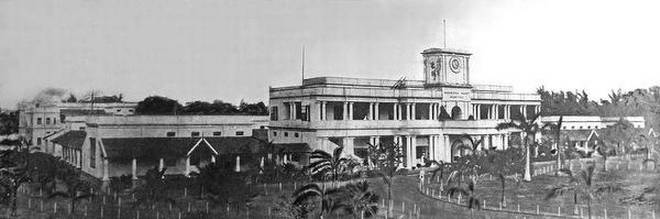
Rainy Hospital in its prime

After graduation, she travelled to Madras in India. At the time she was sent to take the post, there were only 60 women registered as physicians in England and only ten were serving abroad. MacPhail founded a permanent dispensary and clinic in her home in Madras during 1888, primarily focussing on health care for women and children. Christina Rainy, a Scottish educationist (and sister of Robert Rainy), arrived in Madras towards the end of the 19th century, and began raising funds to support the clinic back in Scotland. These additional funds allowed for the clinic to be expanded and a fully fledged mission, Rainy Hospital, was opened in 1914 by Lord Pentland.

During The Great War, MacPhail travelled to Serbia as a doctor and worked for the French under the auspices of the SWH at a sanatorium in Haute Savoie.

MacPhail returned to the hospital in Madras and was still working there in 1928. The hospital was nearly entirely funded by contributions by some private patients and some charitable grants.

== Death ==
MacPhail died in Edinburgh on 6 November 1946.

== Awards and honours ==
In 1912 MacPhail received a silver Kaisar-i-Hind Medal for public services in India from the Indian Viceroy. She was granted an additional service bar to the Kaisar-i-Hind Medal in 1918.

She was awarded an OBE in the King George V Birthday honours list 1930.
