= Arumugam Sellamuttu =

British Merchant and Philanthropist

Atikar Arumugam Sellamuttu, MBE was a prominent Ceylonese colonial-era merchant and landowner.

Educated at the Royal College, Colombo, he became a leading figure in the mercantile sector serving as a director of Lanka Life Assurance Ltd. and Sellamijttu Sivanathan & Co., Ltd.. He receded at "St. Edwin", Rosmead Place, Colombo. He was appointed a Member of the Most Excellent Order of the British Empire in the 1930 Birthday Honours for his philanthropic activities and had been awarded the title of Atikar.

The Atikar A Sellamuttu Prize has been awarded at Royal College, Colombo since 1935.
