= Frederick McLaren =

English cricketer and soldier

Personal information
- Full name: Frederick Albert McLaren
- Born: 19 August 1874; Farnham, Surrey, England
- Died: 23 September 1952 (aged 78); Dartford, Kent, England
- Batting: Right-handed
- Bowling: Unknown-arm fast-medium

Domestic team information
- Years: Team
- 1908: Hampshire
- 1919/20: Europeans

Career statistics
Competition	First-class
Matches	3
Runs scored	23
Batting average	4.60
100s/50s	–/–
Top score	18
Balls bowled	288
Wickets	6
Bowling average	24.00
5 wickets in innings	–
10 wickets in match	–
Best bowling	2/30
Catches/stumpings	1/–
- Source: Cricinfo, 17 January 2010

Frederick Albert McLaren OBE (19 August 1874 — 23 September 1952) was an English first-class cricketer and an officer in the British Army.

McLaren was born at Farnham in August 1874. A non-commissioned officer in the Army Service Corps (ACS), McLaren made two appearances in first-class cricket for Hampshire in 1908, against the Marylebone Cricket Club at Lord's and the Gentlemen of Philadelphia at Southampton. in the latter match, he was one of five wickets for Bart King in Hampshire's first innings. In the opening weeks of the First World War, he gained a commission with the ASC as a second lieutenant. He was made a temporary lieutenant in May 1915, and a temporary captain in November of the same year; he later gained the full rank of captain in November 1917.

While serving with the ASC in British India following the war, he made a single first-class appearance for the Europeans cricket team against the Indians at Madras in the 1919–20 Madras Presidency Match. Across his three first-class matches, McLaren scored 23 runs and took six wickets. By September 1924, he had retired, having exceeded the age for recall and therefore ceased to belong to the Reserve of Officers. McLaren was made an OBE in the 1930 Birthday Honours, in recognition of his post-retirement work at the Royal Army Service Corps record and pay office. He died at Dartford in September 1952.
