= Francis William Goodenough =

British marketing executive (1872 – 1940)

Sir Francis William Goodenough CBE
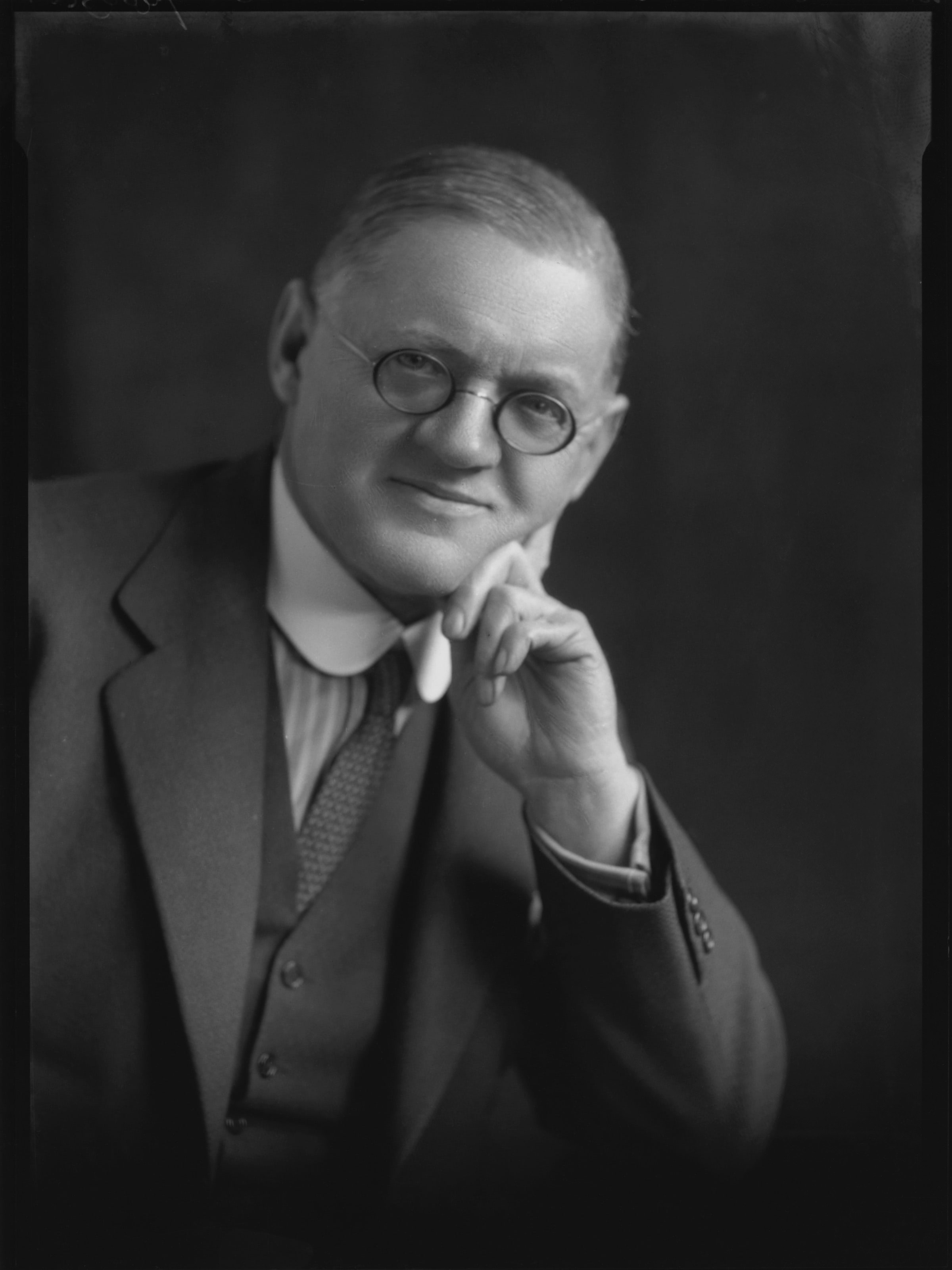
- Goodenough in 1929
- Born: 9 September 1872; Newton Abbot
- Died: 11 January 1940 (aged 69); London
- Education: Torquay Public College
- Occupation: Marketing Executive
- Employer(s): Gas Light and Coke Company
- Known for: Pioneer in marketing and sales

Sir Francis William Goodenough CBE (9 September 1872 – 11 January 1940) was a marketing executive operating in the gas industry.

== Early life ==
Francis William Goodenough was born on 9 September 1872 at Newton Abbot to Henry Goodenough and Louisa Hatchwell. He attended Torquay Public College, from where he joined the Gas Light and Coke Company at the age of 16.

== Business career ==
Goodenough asserted that marketing was a neglected area of business and the gas sales department was founded under his tenure. Indeed, he wrote on the subject of marketing and in one piece noted,

Salesmanship must begin in the board room, continue in the office, control the factory and transport organisation, and persist in service after sale.

— Sir Francis William Goodenough

He service in various professional bodies throughout his career, including the British Commercial Gas Association, the National Gas Council, the Council of the Federation of British Industries, the British Export Society and the Incorporated Sales Managers' Association.

== Public Service ==
Goodenough also served with public bodies, such as the London War Pensions Committee from 1916 to 1921. In the area of education, he was on a committee looking at exams in part-time schools. In 1928 he was appointed as chair of a government committee examining education for salesmanship.

== Private life ==
In 1900, Goodenough married Ellen, the couple had no children.

In his spare time Goodenough enjoyed fishing, golf and was a member of the London Devonian Society.

His work was acknowledged in 1926 with a CBE and a knighthood in 1930.

In later life he suffered with poor health and died at his London home, 39 Holland Street, on 11 January 1940.Goodenough was cremated at Golders Green and a memorial service was held at St. Mary Abbot's Church in Kensington.
