= Ikkadu Kandigai =

Coordinates: 13.17241°N 79.93582°E

Ikkadu Kandigai is a village near Tiruvallur town in the Indian state of Tamil Nadu. It is five kilometers from Tiruvallur town. The population is around 400 families. It is covered by fully cultivated lands.

Even though it is in Tamil Nadu, Telugu language is the mother tongue for most of the people. Ikkadu Kandigai consists of three small divisions, Madhakoil, Ikkadu Kandigai and Redhills puram. Madhakoil consists of 97% Telugu Christian families, along with a few Muslim and Hindu families.

== Religion ==
This Village has two christian congregations, CSI Bethel Church and Alleluia Trinity Church.

CSI Bethel church is 140 years old. It was built by Rev William Goudie, Wesleyan Methodist Mission Society, UK.

Prasanna Venkatesa Perumal Koil was recently built.

Two goddess temples Ankaala Parameswari and Maathama are located inside the village.

== Facilities ==
A CSI hospital is situated at Ikkadu in 2 kilometers away. There is a primary school of the panchayath located in the village which is run by the state government of Tamil Nadu, for secondary education folks used to go to CSI High School, Ikkadu or Tiruvallur town.

== Economy ==
Ikkadu Kandigai has very fertile land suitable for cultivation of paddy, sugar cane, groundnut and jasmine flowers. Since the old irrigation system of lake-irrigation is not productive during summer, from 1995 farmers started implementing a bore-well irrigation system.
