= Arthur Massey (doctor) =

British doctor and author

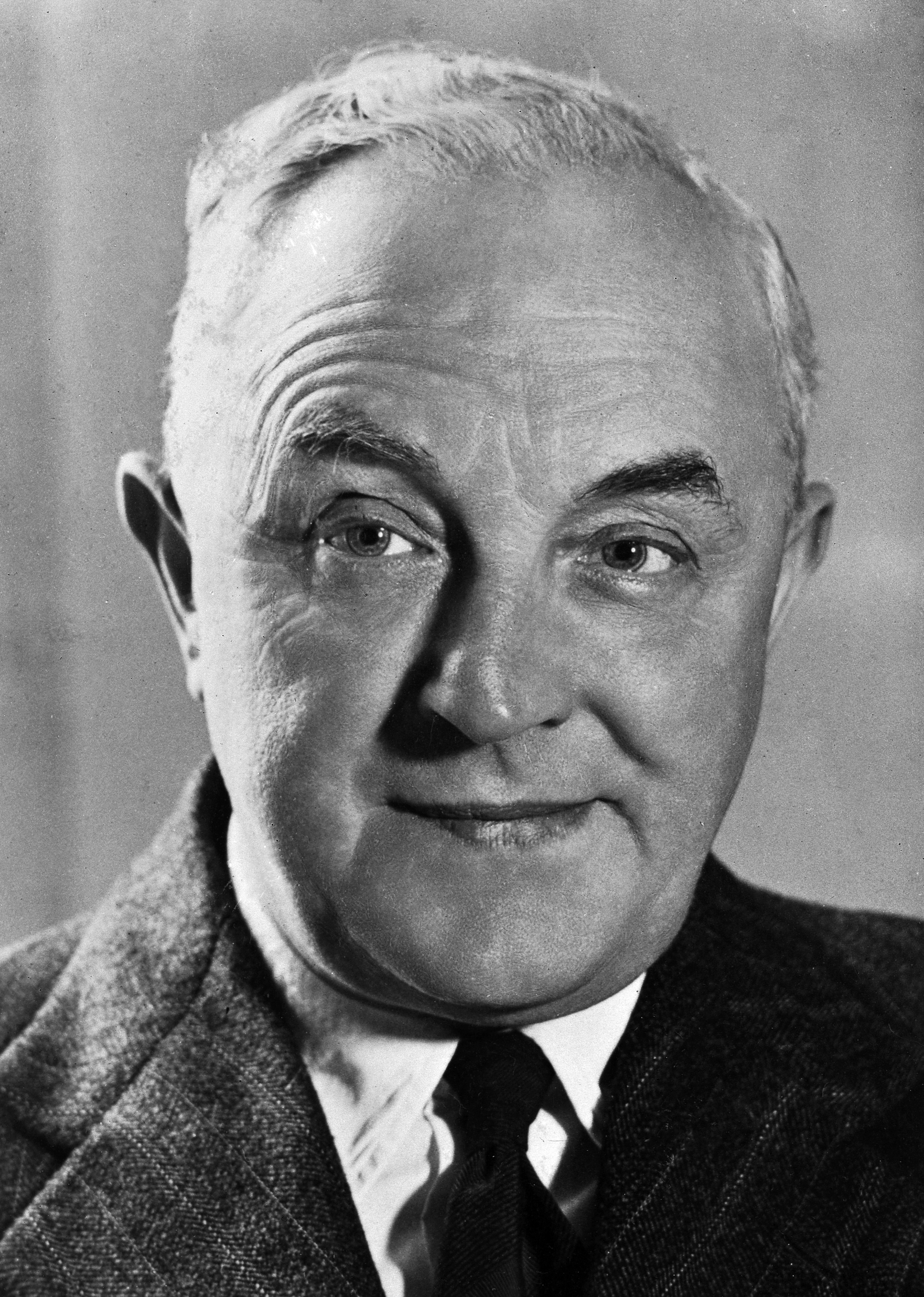
Black and white portrait photograph of Sir Arthur Massey

Sir Arthur Massey CBE (5 January 1894 – 13 April 1980) was a British medical doctor and author. He was the medical officer of Coventry and author of Epidemiology in Relation to Air Travel (1933). In 1950, he became honorary physician to King George VI.
