= Cecil Fforde =

British barrister, judge and diplomat

Sir Cecil Robert Fforde KC (24 June 1875 – 20 October 1951) was a British barrister, judge and diplomat.

== Biography ==
Fforde was born in Bombay, British India, the second son of Arthur Brownlow Fforde of County Down and Mary Carver. He was educated at Bedford School and called to the Irish bar in 1903. He was appointed King's Counsel and counsel to the attorney-general for Ireland, in 1919, senior counsel to the Crown, in 1920, and judge in the Lahore High Court, between 1922 and 1931. He was appointed judge president of Special Courts in Bechuanaland and Swaziland, judicial commissioner of Basutoland, and legal adviser to the High Commissioner for South Africa, in 1934, and as High Commissioner for these territories, between 1935 and 1936, representing the territories at the coronation of King George VI in 1937.

Fforde was invested as a Knight Bachelor by King George V at Buckingham Palace on 13 June 1930.

In 1911, he married Mary Constance Chetham-Strode, daughter of Admiral Sir Edward Chetham-Strode. He died in Hindhead on 20 October 1951.
