= Harold Whittingham =

British physician

Sir Harold Whittingham
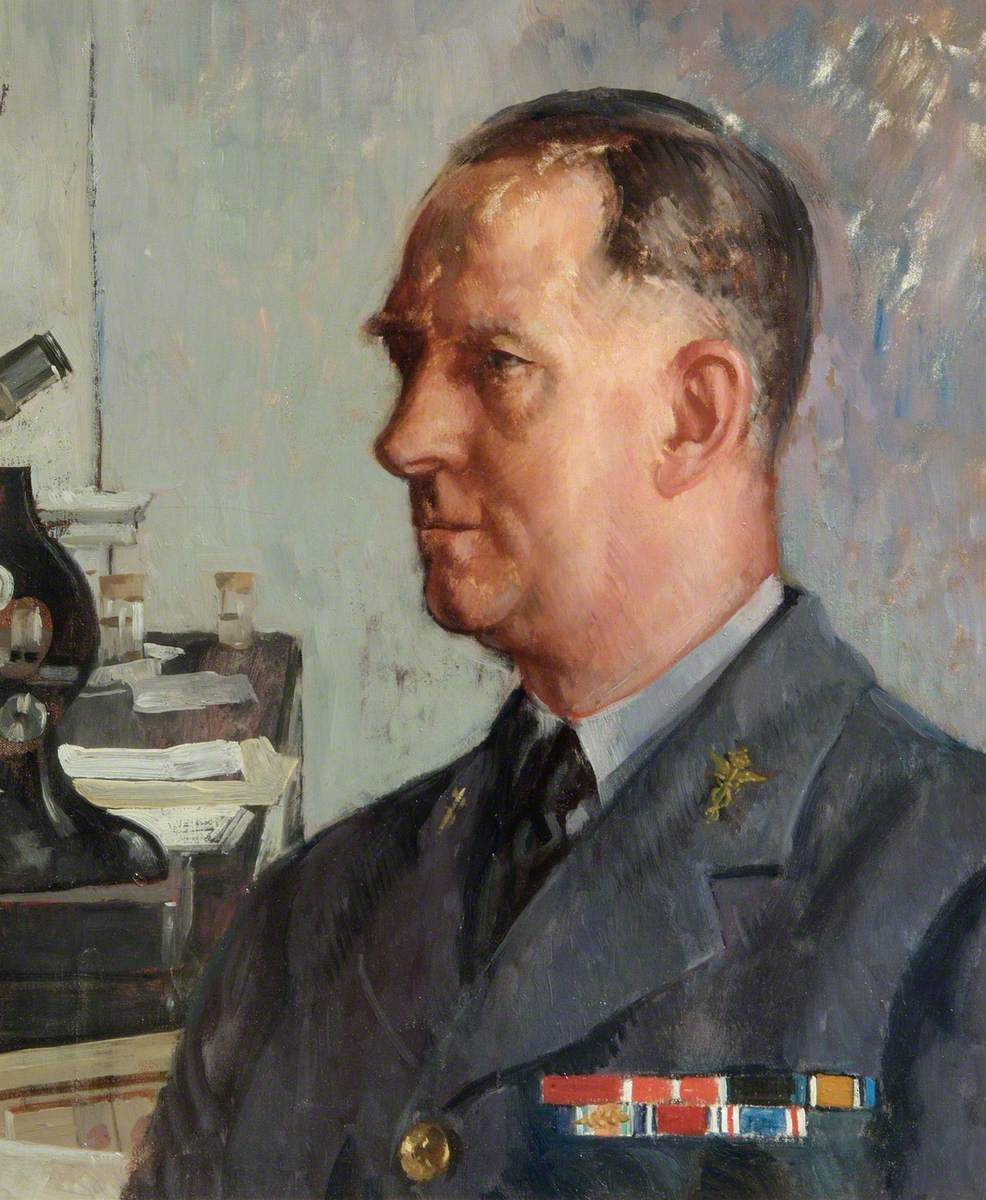
- Portrait by Francis Ernest Jackson, 1945
- Born: 3 October 1887
- Died: 16 July 1983 (aged 95)
- Military career
- Allegiance: United Kingdom
- Branch: British Army (1915–18); Royal Air Force (1918–46)
- Service years: 1915–1946
- Rank: Air Marshal
- Commands: RAF Central Medical Establishment
- Conflicts: First World War; Second World War
- Awards: Knight Commander of the Order of the Bath; Knight Commander of the Order of the British Empire; Mentioned in Despatches; Commander of the Legion of Merit (United States); Order of Polonia Restituta (Poland); Order of St. Olav (Norway)

Air Marshal Sir Harold Edward Whittingham, KCB, KBE, FRCP, FRCPE, (3 October 1887 – 16 July 1983) was a British physician notable for a distinguished medical career in the Royal Air Force and contributions to aviation medicine. After graduating from the University of Glasgow, he was the first pathologist and Assistant Director of Research at the Beatson Institute for Cancer Research in Glasgow.

Much of his work concerned pathology, disease, aerospace medicine, medical records, medical education, first aid, malaria, tropical medicine, physiology and occupational health.

== Early life ==
Whittingham was the second son of Engineer-Rear Admiral William Whittingham and Elizabeth Annie, and like his siblings he chose to study medicine. He was educated at Christ's Hospital, the Greenock Academy and the University of Glasgow. As an undergraduate he excelled at winning medals of distinction in zoology, surgery, pathology and the Gairdner medal in the practice of medicine.

His first post in 1910 was as pathologist and assistant director of research at the Royal Cancer Hospital, Glasgow (later renamed to the Beaston Institute), which had a dedicated area for the pathological study of cancer.

In 1915 he was a volunteer in the First World War, serving in the Royal Army Medical Corps and subsequently the Royal Flying Corps in India and Mesopotamia, where he pursued his studies in tropical medicine. In 1917 his younger brother Clive, who was also a physician, was killed in action; his elder brother William was killed in action in 1918.

== RAF career ==
=== Tropical medicine ===
Whittingham had a long career in the Royal Air Force (RAF), beginning in 1918 when he was transferred to the RAF as a pathologist. Promotion followed, and by 1923 he was wing commander and head of the Sandfly fever commission, stationed at Kalafrana, Malta. He was the first to study and breed sandfly in captivity; his recommendations resulted in reduced incidence of sandfly fever within the RAF.

For his sandfly research paper he was in 1923 awarded the North Persian Medal, given annually for the best tropical research paper. His highly detailed sandfly drawings were displayed at the British Empire Exhibition of 1924 and are now in the Wellcome Library in London. As well as serving as director of pathology and tropical medicines for the RAF, he gave biochemistry lectures at the London School of Hygiene & Tropical Medicine during the inter-war years.

=== Aviation medicine ===
From 1927 to 1939 he was a pathologist at the Royal Buckinghamshire Hospital, and in 1930 he was appointed a Commander of the Order of the British Empire. In 1932 he became group captain and from 1934 until 1939 was the commanding officer of the RAF Central Medical Establishment, promoted to air commodore in 1936. He took the Membership of the Royal College of Physicians in 1936 and was elected a Fellow of the Royal College of Physicians in 1940.

From 1938 until 1946 he held the appointment of honorary physician to the king. He was given a knighthood at the beginning of the Second World War. Many of his lecture notes, drawings and cartoons were implemented into Air Ministry booklets such as Health Hints for Warm Climates, and distributed for the well-being of British servicemen. Lessons learnt from the war indicated that there was a requirement for studying the effects of aviation on aircrew, and in 1943 he proposed the establishment of the RAF Institute of Aviation Medicine (IAM). He was successful and it was eventually built on a corner of Farnborough airfield and officially opened by the Princess Royal in 1945.

Problems with exposure to altitude in flying – such as hypoxia – had already been recognised, and with future high altitude aircraft such as the English Electric Canberra being envisaged, the IAM played an important role in altitude protection. They covered both military and commercial issues, such as determining the safe maximum cabin altitude for commercial passenger aircraft.

== Post-war ==
He was made a Commander of the Legion of Merit by the United States and awarded the Order of Polonia Restituta by Poland in 1945, retiring from the RAF in 1946 to become medical adviser to the British Red Cross Society where his expertise was used for military and civilian first aid manuals. In 1948 he joined the airline BOAC as director of medical services, where he worked for the next decade. In 1949 he was appointed chairman of the Air Ministry Flying Personnel Research Committee, whose brief was to advise the Secretary of State for Air on all aspects of research concerning flight safety. Whittingham and his colleagues travelled the world, examining medical facilities, sanitation and food supplies in BOAC stations, and made reports and recommendations for improvement. During his career he made significant contributions toward investigating medical evidence from aircraft crashes; most significantly, the Comet disasters. The findings of the Comet team led by Group Captain Bill Stewart demonstrated the need for research-trained medical specialists, and this led to the formation of the RAF Department of Aviation Pathology. In 1955, a conference was held from which the Joint Committee on Aviation Pathology was formed, consisting of members from the flying services of the US, Canada and Britain.

Whittingham, a member of the British Medical Association, was held in high esteem by his peers. In 1973, the RCP professorship of aviation medicine was renamed the Whittingham professorship "in honour of his outstanding leadership in this field".

== Honours ==
During his career, he gained the following honours:

- MB ChB Glasg (1910)
- DPH (1919)
- DTM&H (1920)
- North Persian Memorial Medal (1923)
- Chadwick Gold Medal (1925)
- FRFPSG (1926)
- MRCP (1927)
- CBE (1930)
- KBE (1941)
- KCB (1944)
- Hon LLD Glasg (1943)
- John Jeffries Institute of Aeronautical Sciences (1944)
- FRCPE (1945)
- Hon FRCSE (1945)
- Order of Polonia Restituta (1945)
- USA Legion of Merit (Commander) (1945)
- Order of St. Olav(1945)
- FRCP (1946)
- Stewart memorial award (1970)
