= 1943 Birthday Honours =

Appointments by King George VI

The King's Birthday Honours 1943 were appointments by King George VI to various orders and honours to reward and highlight good works by people of the British Empire. They were published on 2 June 1943 for the United Kingdom and Canada.

The recipients of honours are displayed here as they were styled before their new honour, and arranged by honour, with classes (Knight, Knight Grand Cross, etc.) and then divisions (Military, Civil, etc.) as appropriate.

== British Empire ==
=== Baron ===
- Air Chief Marshal Sir Hugh Caswall Tremenheere Dowding, GCB, GCVO, CMG, Air Officer Commanding-in-Chief, Fighter Command, 1936–40.

=== Privy Councillor ===
- Harcourt Johnstone, MP, Parliamentary Secretary, Department of Overseas Trade; Member of Parliament for South Shields, 1931–35; for East Willesden, 1923–24; and for Middlesbrough West since 1940.
- Geoffrey William Lloyd, MP, Parliamentary Secretary (Petroleum), Ministry of Fuel and Power, and Chairman of the Oil Control Board; Member of Parliament for the Ladywood Division of Birmingham since 1931.
- Colonel Arthur Claud Spencer, Baron Templemore, KCVO, DSO, OBE, Captain of the King's Bodyguard of the Yeoman of the Guard; Lord-in-waiting to the King, 1929 and 1931–34.
- Joseph Westwood, MP, Joint Parliamentary Under-Secretary of State for Scotland; Member of Parliament for Peebles and South Midlothian, 1922–31, and for Stirling and Falkirk since 1935.

=== Baronet ===
- The Right Honourable John Milne Barbour, JP, DL, MP, lately Minister of Finance, Northern Ireland.
- Sir John Fraser, KCVO, MC, MD, ChM, FRCS(Ed), Regius Professor of Clinical Surgery, Edinburgh University; Honorary Surgeon in Scotland to the King.

=== Knight Bachelor ===
- Stanley Hugh Badock, LLD, JP. For services to the University of Bristol.
- Hugh Eyre Campbell Beaver, Director-General, Ministry of Works.
- Captain John Paul Black, Managing Director, Standard Motor Company Ltd., and Chairman, Joint Aero-Engine Committee.
- Daniel Alfred Edmond Cabot, MRCVS, Chief Veterinary Officer, Ministry of Agriculture and Fisheries.
- Alderman John William Catlow, JP, Chairman of the Middlesex Education Committee.
- Henry Cooper, Chairman, Merchants' Consultative Committee; Chairman, Chamber of Coal Traders.
- John Craig, CBE, JP, DL, Chairman and Managing Director of Colvilles Ltd.
- Graham Cunningham, Controller-General of Munitions Production, Ministry of Supply.
- William Young Darling, CBE, MC, Lord Provost of Edinburgh.
- Herbert Davis, CBE, Director of Oils and Fats, Ministry of Food.
- Herbert Lightfoot Eason, CB, CMG, MD, MS, FRCS, President, General Medical Council.
- John Fox, OBE, Chief Registrar of Friendly Societies, and Industrial Assurance Commissioner.
- Cleveland Fyfe, CBE, General Secretary, National Farmers' Union.
- Alderman Frederick Hindle. For public services in Lancashire.
- Captain Robert Beaufin Irving, OBE, RD, Royal Naval Reserve (Retd.), Commodore Captain of Cunard White Star Ltd.
- Harold Spencer Jones, ScD, FRS, FRAS, Astronomer Royal.
- William John Andrew Jones, CMG, Deputy Chairman, West African Governors' Conference. Joint Secretary, War Council, Office of the Minister Resident in West Africa.
- John Macfarlane Kennedy, OBE, MInstCE, MIEE, Deputy Chairman, Electricity Commission.
- Eric Macfadyen. For services to agriculture in the Colonial Empire.
- Archibald McKinstry, MIEE, MIMechE, Deputy Chairman and Managing Director, Babcock & Wilcox Ltd.
- Arnold Duncan McNair, CBE, LLD, FBA, Vice-Chancellor, University of Liverpool.
- Alexander Hyslop Maxwell, Tobacco Controller, Board of Trade.
- Thomas Gillan Mitchell, JP, Lord Provost of Aberdeen.
- Professor John Linton Myres, OBE, DLitt, DSc, FSA, FBA. For services to learning.
- Harry Nell, Controller of Death Duties, Board of Inland Revenue.
- Charles Henry Newton, Chief General Manager, London and North Eastern Railway Company.
- George Peat, Deputy Director, Liner Division, Ministry of War Transport.
- George Stanley Pott, President of the Council of The Law Society.
- Eustace Ralph Pulbrook, Chairman of Lloyd's.
- Eric Cecil Heygate Salmon, MC, Clerk of the London County Council. For services to Civil Defence.
- George Paget Thomson, FRS, Professor of Physics, Imperial College of Science and Technology.
- William Whyte, General Manager, Royal Bank of Scotland.

Dominions

- The Honourable Allan Ross Welsh, Speaker of the Legislative Assembly, Southern Rhodesia.

India

- John Leonard Stone, OBE, Barrister-at-Law, Chief Justice designate of the High Court of Judicature at Bombay.
- The Honourable Mr. Justice Harilal Jekisondas Kania, Puisne Judge of the High Court of Judicature at Bombay.
- The Honourable Mr. Justice Clifford Monmohan Agarwala, Barrister-at-Law, Puisne Judge of the High Court of Judicature at Patna.
- Pheroze Merwan Kharegat, CIE, Indian Civil Service, Vice-Chairman, Imperial Council of Agricultural Research.
- Captain Sardar Buta Singh, CBE, Member of the Council of State, Landlord, Amritsar, Punjab.
- Robert Renwick Haddow, Member of the Council of State, Senior Partner, Messrs. Mackinnon Mackenzie & Company, Bengal.
- Cyril Sankay Fox, DSc, MIMinE, FGS, Director, Geological Survey of India.
- Raja Saiyid Ahmad Ali Khan Alvi, CBE, Member of the Legislative Assembly, Salempur, Lucknow, United Provinces.
- Frederick Anderson, CSI, CIE, Indian Service of Engineers (Retd.), Public Works and Revenue Minister and Chief Engineer, Bahawalpur State.
- Rai Bahadur Oudh Narain Bisarya, President and Member-in-charge of the Revenue and Public Health Departments, Bhopal State, Central India.
- Robert Menzies, OBE, VD, Managing Director, British India Corporation, Cawnpore, United Provinces.
- Mathuradas Vissanji, Director, Wallace Flour Mills, Bombay.

Burma

- John Tait, General Manager, Messrs. Steel Brothers & Co. Ltd.

Colonies, Protectorates, Etc.

- Samuel Howard Ellis, MBE, Director of Man Power National Service, Fiji.
- John Hutson, OBE, VD, MB, CM, DPH. For public services in Barbados.
- George Graham Paul, Colonial Legal Service, Chief Justice, Sierra Leone.
- William James Howard Trott, CBE. For public services in Bermuda.

=== Order of the Bath ===
==== Knight Commander of the Order of the Bath (KCB) ====
Military Division

Royal Navy

- Vice-Admiral (Acting Admiral) Sir Bruce Austin Fraser, KBE, CB.
- Vice-Admiral Arthur Lumley St. George Lyster, CB, CBE, CVO, DSO.
- Vice-Admiral Algernon Usborne Willis, CB, DSO.
- Engineer Vice-Admiral Frederick Richard Gordon Turner, CB, OBE.

Army

- Lieutenant-General Alexander Hood, CB, CBE, MD, KHP, (18164), late Royal Army Medical Corps.
- Lieutenant-General Henry Charles Loyd, CB, DSO, MC, (17960), late Coldstream Guards.
- Lieutenant-General (Acting) Ronald Morce Weeks, CBE, DSO, MC, TD, (51084), Territorial Army.

Royal Air Force

- Air Marshal Alfred Guy Roland Garrod, CB, OBE, MC, DFC.
- Air Marshal Richard Hallam Peck, CB, OBE.
- Acting Air Marshal Roy Maxwell Drummond, CB, DSO, OBE, MC.
- Acting Air Marshal John Cotesworth Slessor, CB, DSO, MC.

Civil Division

- James Scott Pringle, CB, OBE, ACGI, MIEE.
- Nelson King Johnson, Director of the Meteorological Office.
- Sir Frederick Carl Bovenschen, KBE, CB, Joint Permanent Under-Secretary of State for War.
- Sir William Scott Douglas, KBE, CB, Permanent Secretary, Ministry of Supply.
- Sir Geoffrey Granville Whiskard, KCMG, CB, LLD, Permanent Secretary, Ministry of Town and Country Planning.

==== Companion of the Order of the Bath (CB) ====
Military Division

Royal Navy

- Rear-Admiral Arthur Malcolm Peters, DSC.
- Rear-Admiral Irvine Gordon Glennie.
- Rear-Admiral Arthur Francis Eric Palliser, DSC.
- Rear-Admiral Denis William Boyd, CBE, DSC.
- The Venerable Archdeacon Thomas Crick, CBE, MVO, MA, Chaplain of the Fleet.
- Engineer Rear-Admiral John Kingcome.
- Surgeon Rear-Admiral William Harold Edgar, OBE, MD, BS, KHP.
- Major (Brevet Lieutenant-Colonel) (Acting Colonel Commandant) (Temporary Brigadier) Leslie Chasemore Hollis, CBE.

Army

- Major-General Frederick Vavasour Broome Witts, CBE, DSO, MC, (24225), late Royal Engineers.
- Major-General Albert Robert Valon, OBE, MC, MIMechE, (3976), Colonel Commandant, Royal Electrical and Mechanical Engineers.
- Major-General Richard Lawrence Bond, CBE, DSO, MC, (12212), late Royal Engineers.
- Major-General Oswald William McSheehy, DSO, OBE, MB, KHS, (15664), late Royal Army Medical Corps.
- Major-General Gerald Russell Smallwood, DSO, MC, (5238), late The East Yorkshire Regiment (The Duke of York's Own).
- Major-General Stanley Woodburn Kirby, CIE, OBE, MC, (8398), late Royal Engineers.
- Major-General (temporary Lieutenant-General) Frederick Edgworth Morgan (8223), late Royal Artillery.
- Major-General (acting Lieutenant-General) Montagu George North Stopford, DSO, MC, (47658), late The Rifle Brigade (Prince Consort's Own).
- Major-General Montagu Brocas Burrows, DSO, MC, (17658), late 5th Royal Inniskilling Dragoon Guards.
- Colonel (temporary Major-General) Philip James Shears (10498), late The Border Regiment.
- Colonel (temporary Major-General) Noel Galway Holmes, CBE, MC, (4842), late The East Yorkshire Regiment (The Duke of York's Own).
- Colonel (temporary Major-General) Arthur Arnhold Bullick Dowler (8634), late The East Surrey Regiment.
- Colonel (temporary Major-General) (acting Lieutenant-General) Gerard Corfield Bucknall, MC, (5026), late The Middlesex Regiment (Duke of Cambridge's Own).
- Colonel (temporary Major-General) Hugh Tennent MacMullen, CBE, MC, (10010), late The East Lancashire Regiment.
- Colonel (temporary Major-General) Alexander Whitmore Colquhoun Richardson, DSO, (4059), late Royal Tank Corps.
- Major-General Henry Hampden Rich (1105), Indian Army.
- Colonel (temporary Major-General) Cecil Wotton Toovey, CBE, MC, (53934), Indian Army.
- Major-General Alister Argyll Campbell McNeill, MB, BCh (Glasg), KHS, (30412), Indian Army.
- Colonel (temporary Major-General) Gordon West Hodgen, OBE, (183408), Indian Army.

Royal Air Force

- Air Vice-Marshal Brian Edmund Baker, DSO, MC, AFC.
- Air Vice-Marshal Charles Roderick Carr, CBE, DFC, AFC.
- Air Vice-Marshal John Beresford Cole-Hamilton, CBE.
- Air Vice-Marshal Frank Cuninghame Cowtan, MRCS, LRCP, KHS.
- Air Vice-Marshal Hugh Henry MacLeod Fraser.
- Air Vice-Marshal Alan Lees, CBE, DSO, AFC.
- Air Vice-Marshal Charles Warburton Meredith, CBE, AFC, Royal Air Force Volunteer Reserve.
- Air Vice-Marshal Robert Dickinson Oxland, CBE.
- Air Vice-Marshal Hugh William Lumsden Saunders, CBE, MC, DFC, MM.
- Air Vice-Marshal Victor Hubert Tait, OBE.
- Air Vice-Marshal Horace Ernest Philip Wigglesworth, CBE, DSC.
- Acting Air Vice-Marshal Harold Spencer Kerby, DSC, AFC.
- Acting Air Vice-Marshal Alfred Conrad Collier, CBE.
- Air Vice-Marshal George Jones, CBE, DFC, Royal Australian Air Force.
- Air Vice-Marshal Robert Victor Goddard, CBE, Royal New Zealand Air Force.

Civil Division

- Colonel William Philip Cutlack, TD, DL, Chairman, Territorial Army Association of the County of Cambridge and Isle of Ely.
- Colonel Paul Julius Gottlieb Gueterbock, DSO, MC, TD, Chairman, Territorial Army and Air Force Association of the County of Gloucester.
- John Morrison Caie, Deputy Secretary, Department of Agriculture for Scotland.
- Thomas Sidney Chegwidden, CVO, Under Secretary, Ministry of Production.
- Eric Francis Cliff, lately Principal Establishment Officer, Air Ministry; now Treasury Establishment Representative in Washington.
- Charles Blake Coxwell, OBE, Principal Assistant Secretary, Admiralty.
- William Scott Farren, MBE, FRAeS, Director, Royal Aircraft Establishment, Ministry of Aircraft Production.
- Geoffrey Stuart King, MC, Principal Assistant Secretary, Assistance Board.
- David John Lidbury, CMG, DSO, Assistant Director-General, General Post Office.
- Wilfred Alexander Marsden, Keeper of the Department of Printed Books, Maps, Charts and Plans, British Museum, and Honorary Curator of the King's Music Library, British Museum.
- Edward Vincent Thompson, Principal Assistant Solicitor, Office of HM Procurator-General and Treasury Solicitor.
- Sydney Herbert Wood, MC, Principal Assistant Secretary, Board of Education.

=== Order of the Star of India ===
==== Knight Commander of the Order of the Star of India (KCSI) ====
- Lieutenant His Highness Maharaja Shri Sewai Tej Singhji Bahadur, Maharaja of Alwar.
- Sir Girija Shankar Bajpai, KBE, CIE, Indian Civil Service, Agent-General for India in the United States of America.

==== Companion of the Order of the Star of India (CSI) ====
- Henry Carlos Prior, CIE, Indian Civil Service, Secretary to the Government of India in the Department of Labour.
- Major-General Neville Godfray Hind, MC, Indian Army, Commander, Sind District.
- Ferdinand Blyth Wace, CIE, Indian Civil Service, Secretary to the Government of the Punjab in the Home Department.

=== Order of Saint Michael and Saint George ===
==== Knight Grand Cross of the Order of St Michael and St George (GCMG) ====
- Sir Henry Monck-Mason Moore, KCMG, Governor and Commander-in-Chief of Kenya.

==== Knight Commander of the Order of St Michael and St George (KCMG) ====
- Frederick Geoffrey Shedden, CMG, OBE, Secretary of the Department of Defence, the War Cabinet, and the Advisory War Council, and Civil Member of the Defence Committee, Commonwealth of Australia.
- Sir William Alison Russell. For services to the Colonial Office.
- Hugh Cholmondeley Thornton, CMG, CVO, Senior Crown Agent.
- Lieutenant-Colonel Claude Edward Marjoribanks Dansey, CMG, attached to a Department of the Foreign Office.
- Anthony Hastings George, CMG, His Majesty's Consul-General at Boston.
- Owen St. Clair O'Malley, CMG, His Majesty's Ambassador Extraordinary and Plenipotentiary to the Polish Government in London.
- Francis D'Arcy Godolphin Osborne, CMG, His Majesty's Envoy Extraordinary and Minister Plenipotentiary to the Holy See. (Dated 14 May 1943).

==== Companion of the Order of St Michael and St George (CMG) ====
- Gerald Henry Avezathe, Ministry of War Transport Representative in Lagos.
- Alfred Charles Boddis, Controller of Supply Services, British Air Commission, Washington.
- Major-General Reginald Alexander Dallas Brooks, DSO, Royal Marines. Employed in the Political Warfare Executive.
- Wilfred Charles George Cribbett, Director of Administration and Finance, Royal Air Force Delegation, Washington.
- Eion Pelly Donaldson, Assistant Secretary, Offices of the War Cabinet.
- Charles Rowlatt Watkins-Mence, CIE, Controller, Imperial Censorship Unit, Bermuda.
- Gilbert Shaw Whitham, CBE, MIChemE, Director-General of Production Services, Ministry of Supply. Lately Head of the British Technical Mission in Turkey.
- Maurice Edward Antrobus, OBE, Official Secretary in the Office of the High Commissioner in the Commonwealth of Australia for His Majesty's Government in the United Kingdom.
- Percival Martin Cooper, OBE, MInstCE, MIM & CyE, MIStructE, Director of Public Works, Jamaica.
- James Dundas Harford, Colonial Administrative Service, Administrator, St. Kitts Nevis.
- Edward Gerald Hawkesworth, MC, Colonial Administrative Service, Chief Commissioner of Ashanti, Gold Coast.
- William Cyril Campbell King, Colonial Police Service, Commissioner of Police, Nigeria.
- Thomas Ingram Kynaston Lloyd, an Assistant Under-Secretary of State, Colonial Office.
- Thorleif Rattray Orde Mangin, Colonial Administrative Service, Provincial Commissioner, Gold Coast.
- Sydney Raymond Marlow, Colonial Administrative Service, Financial Secretary, Tanganyika Territory.
- William James Price, MInstCE, Director of Public Works and Civil Aviation, Ceylon.
- Richard Ogilvy Ramage, Colonial Administrative Service, Colonial Secretary, Sierre Leone.
- Charles Eustace Rooke, General Manager, Nigerian Railway.
- Edward Francis Twining, MBE, Colonial Administrative Service, Director of Labour, Mauritius.
- Geoffrey Walsh, CBE, Economic Adviser and Food Controller, Palestine.
- Joshua Edward Synge Cooper, attached to a Department of the Foreign Office.
- Hugh Ellis-Rees, Financial Adviser to His Majesty's Embassy at Madrid.
- Charles Empson, Commercial Secretary at His Majesty's Embassy at Cairo.
- John Wilson Edington Miller, Deputy Financial Secretary to the Sudan Government.
- Robert Parr, OBE, His Majesty's Consul-General at Brazzaville.
- Robert Townsend Smallbones, MBE, His Majesty's Consul-General at São Paulo.
- Christopher Frederick Ashton Warner, a Counsellor in the Foreign Office.
- Cecil Allan Walter Were, His Majesty's Consul-General at Alexandria.

Honorary Companion

- Sultan Ahmed Bin Fadhl. For public services in the Aden Protectorate.

=== Order of the Indian Empire ===
==== Knight Grand Commander of the Order of the Indian Empire (GCIE) ====
- His Highness Maharaja Sri Kerala Varma, Maharaja of Cochin.

==== Knight Commander of the Order of the Indian Empire (KCIE) ====
- Lieutenant-Colonel Charles Geoffrey Prior, CIE, Indian Political Service, Political Resident in the Persian Gulf.
- Sir George Hemming Spence, CSI, CIE, Indian Civil Service, Secretary to the Government of India in the Legislative Department.
- James Downing Penny, CSI, CIE, Indian Civil Service, Financial Commissioner, Development Department, and Secretary to Government, Punjab.
- Sir Thomas Howard Elderton, Chairman, Calcutta Port Commissioners and Regional Priorities Committee.

==== Companion of the Order of the Indian Empire (CIE) ====
- Mohit Kumar Sen Gupta, Indian Audit and Accounts Service, Financial Adviser, Communications.
- Wilfred Harold Shoobert, ED, Indian Civil Service, Director-General, Posts and Telegraphs, New Delhi.
- Lieutenant-Colonel (Acting Major-General) Walter Joseph Cawthorn, CBE, Indian Army, Director of Military Intelligence, General Headquarters, India.
- Jagannath Lakshman Sathe, Indian Civil Service, Senior Member, Board of Revenue, United Provinces.
- Aubrey Dibdin, Assistant Secretary, Economic and Overseas Department, India Office.
- Lieutenant-Colonel Gerald Patrick Murphy, Indian Political Service, lately Resident for the Madras States.
- Sudhindra Kumar Haldar, Indian Civil Service, Commissioner, Burdwan Division, Bengal.
- Donald Marshall Passmore, Deputy Director-General, Directorate General of Supply, Department of Supply, Government of India.
- Allan Robert Eliott Lockhart, Deputy Director-General, Directorate General of Munitions Production, Department of Supply, Government of India.
- Wajahat Hussain, Indian Civil Service, Commissioner, Gorakhpur Division, United Provinces.
- Geoffrey Herbert Mannooch, Indian Police, Inspector-General of Police, Bengal.
- Colonel (Temporary Brigadier) Leonard Gilbert, MC, Indian Army, Commandant, Officers' Training School, Bangalore.
- Colonel (Temporary Brigadier) John Le Clere Fowle, Indian Army, Royal Indian Army Service Corps, Headquarters Eastern Army.
- Colonel (Temporary Brigadier) Henry Charles Deans Rankin, OBE, MB, VHS, Royal Army Medical Corps, Deputy Director of Medical Services, General Headquarters, Indian.
- Lieutenant-Colonel (Temporary Brigadier) James Alfred Daniel, DSO, MC, British Service, Commander, Lucknow Area.
- Lieutenant-Colonel (Temporary Brigadier) William Freke Hasted, CBE, DSO, MC, Royal Engineers, Chief Engineer, Southern Army, lately Deputy Engineer-in-Chief, RAF Works, General Headquarters, India.
- Lieutenant-Colonel George Leslie Mallam, Barrister-at-Law, Indian Political Service, Chief Secretary to the Government of the North-West Frontier Province.
- William Herbert Fletcher Armstrong, Indian Educational Service, Director of Public Instruction, and Secretary to the Government of the Punjab in the Education Department.
- Arnold Gordon Patton, Indian Civil Service, Secretary to the Government of Assam in the Finance and Revenue Departments.
- Govardhan Shankerlal Bhalja, Indian Civil Service, Secretary to the Government of the Central Provinces and Berar in the Finance Department.
- Percival Joseph Griffiths, Central Organizer, National War Front.
- Alan Robert Cecil Westlake, Indian Civil Service, Secretary to the Government of Madras in the Development Department.
- David Symington, Indian Civil Service, Secretary to the Government of Bombay in the Home Department.
- Richard Lean, Chief Mechanical Engineer, Madras and Southern Mahratta Railway, Madras.
- Mangudy Subrahmanyan, Indian Audit and Accounts Service, Accountant-General, Posts and Telegraphs.
- Stewart Ellis Lawrence West, OBE, VD, Director of Traffic, Railway Department (Railway Board), Government of India.
- Rai Bahadur Anil Chandra Banerjea, MB, BS (Allahabad), DPH (USA), Director of Public Health, United Provinces.
- Leslie Neeve Flatt, VD, Director of Mechanical Engineering, Railway Department (Railway Board), Government of India.
- John Alan Stein, Indian Service of Engineers, Chief Engineer, Communications and Works Department, Communications and Buildings Branch, Bengal.
- Khan Bahadur Muhammad Sulaiman, Indian Service of Engineers, Additional Chief Engineer, Central Public Works Department, Government of India.
- Major Basil Woods-Ballard, MBE, Indian Political Service, Political Agent and Deputy Commissioner, Quetta-Pishin.
- Francis Herbert du Heaume, OBE, Indian Police, Deputy Inspector-General of Police, Multan Range, Punjab.
- John Ralph Carlisle Taylor, Petroleum Officer, and ex-officio Deputy Secretary to the Government of India in the Defence Department.
- Ramchandra Govind Sule, LCE, Indian Service of Engineers, Superintending Engineer, Deccan Irrigation Circle, Poona, Bombay.
- Hugh Trotter, Indian Forest Service, Utilisation Officer, Forest Research Institute.
- Arthur John Charles Edwards Chief, Accounting Officer, Office of the High Commissioner for India, London.
- Vellore Lakshmanaswami Ethiraj, Barrister-at-Law, Public Prosecutor, Madras.
- Sardar Bahadur Jaideo Singh, OBI, Major-General, and General Officer Commanding, Bikaner State Forces.
- Tehmus Temulji Kothavala, Secretary, Provincial Transport Authority, Bombay.
- Robert Laing MacLennan, Heeleakha Tea Estate, Sibsagar District, Chairman of the Assam Valley Branch of the Indian Tea Association, Assam.
- Rajandhari Sinha Manager, Hathwa Wards Estate, Hathwa, Saran, Bihar.
- Diwan Bahadur Ramisetti Subbayya Naidu, Chief Minister, Cooch Behar State.

=== Royal Victorian Order ===
==== Knight Grand Cross of the Royal Victorian Order (GCVO) ====
- Rear-Admiral Sir Basil Vernon Brooke, KCVO, (Retd.).

==== Knight Commander of the Royal Victorian Order (KCVO) ====
- Captain Harold George Campbell, CVO, DSO, Royal Navy (Retd.).
- Sir Eric Charles Miéville, KCIE, CSI, CMG.
- Major Henry Hudson Fraser Stockley, CVO, OBE, Royal Marines (Retd.).

==== Commander of the Royal Victorian Order (CVO) ====
- Paymaster Commander Ernest Dudley Gordon Colles, MVO, OBE, Royal Navy (Retd.).
- John Miller Martin.

==== Member of the Royal Victorian Order (MVO) ====
At this time the two lowest classes of the Royal Victorian Order were "Member (fourth class)" and "Member (fifth class)", both with post-nominal letters MVO. "Member (fourth class)" was renamed "Lieutenant" (LVO) from the 1985 New Year Honours onwards.

Fourth Class

- Marion Kirk Crawford.

Fifth Class

- Superintendent Harold Salisbury Green, Metropolitan Police.
- Hubert Idwal Tannar.
- Superintendent Stanley George Woodeson, Norfolk County Constabulary.

=== Order of the British Empire ===
==== Dame Commander of the Order of the British Empire (DBE) ====
Military Division

- Matron-in-Chief Emily Mathieson Blair, RRC, Princess Mary's Royal Air Force Nursing Service.

Civil Division

- Anne Loughlin, OBE, Chairman of the Trades Union Congress General Council.
- Ethel Walker, CBE, ARA, Artist.

==== Knight Commander of the Order of the British Empire (KBE) ====
Military Division

Royal Navy

- Vice-Admiral Gilbert Owen Stephenson, CB, CMG. (Retd.).
- Vice-Admiral Alfred Englefield Evans, CB, OBE. (Retd.).
- Rear-Admiral Edward Owen Cochrane (Retd.).
- Rear-Admiral Wellwood George Courtenay Maxwell, CMG, DCL (Durham). (Retd.).
- Rear-Admiral Errol Manners (Retd.).

Army

- Lieutenant-General Giffard Le Quesne Martel, CB, DSO, MC, MIMechE, (6628), late Royal Engineers.
- Major-General Percy Cleghorn Stanley Hobart, CB, DSO, OBE, MC, (23838), late Royal Tank Corps.

Royal Air Force

- Acting Air Marshal Francis John Linnell, CB, OBE.

Civil Division

- William Dawson Croft, CIE, CVO, Deputy Under-Secretary of State, India Office.
- Bernard William Gilbert, CB, Under-secretary, HM Treasury.
- Godfrey Herbert Ince, CB, Deputy Secretary and Director-General of Man Power, Ministry of Labour and National Service.
- Sir (Thomas) Franklin Sibly, LLD, DSc, Vice-Chancellor, University of Reading. Chairman of the Committee of Vice-Chancellors and Principals.
- Humphrey Ingelram Prideaux-Brune, CMG, OBE, one of His Majesty's Consuls-General in China.
- Sir Wilfrid Wentworth Woods, KCMG, Member of the Commission of Government, Newfoundland, since 1937.
- Sir Don Baron Jayatilaka, Representative of the Ceylon Government in India.

==== Commander of the Order of the British Empire (CBE) ====
Military Division

Royal Navy

- Rear Admiral Hugh Marrack, DSC, (Retd.).
- Engineer Rear Admiral John William Milner, MVO, (Retd.).
- Captain (Commodore Second Class) Ralph Alan Bevan Edwards.
- Captain Humphrey Benson Jacomb, (Retd.).
- Captain Horace Geoffrey Norman.
- Captain Brian Betham Schofield.
- Commander (Acting Captain) Basil Rupert Willett.
- Captain Charles George Ley Woollcombe, (Retd.).
- Engineer Captain Stuart Robins, (Retd.).
- Paymaster Captain George Harold Bankart.
- Paymaster Captain Humphrey Hughes Simpson, (Retd.).
- Paymaster Captain Edward Watkins Whittington-Ince (Retd.).
- Paymaster Commander (Acting Paymaster Captain) Ronald Wilson Paffard.
- Colonel Commandant (Temporary Brigadier) Eric James Banks Noyes, OBE, Royal Marines.
- Instructor Captain Archibald Howard Saunders, OBE.
- Joan Carpenter, Superintendent, Women's Royal Naval Service.

Army

- Colonel (temporary Brigadier) Clifton Edward Rawdon Grant Alban, DSO, (5189), Colonel The King's Regiment (Liverpool), Aide-de-Camp to The King.
- Lieutenant-Colonel (temporary Colonel) Ralph Ernest Barnwell (10255), The Royal Warwickshire Regiment.
- Colonel Patrick James Blair, DSO, TD, Lothian Home Guard.
- Lieutenant-Colonel (temporary Brigadier) William Edmund Roberts Blood, MC, (10229), Royal Engineers.
- Colonel Sir Philip Carlebach, CMG, London Home Guard.
- Lieutenant-Colonel (temporary Brigadier) Cecil Arthur Harrop Chadwick (18784), Royal Corps of Signals.
- Colonel Alfred Fraser Chapman, Bristol Home Guard.
- Lieutenant-Colonel (temporary Colonel) (acting Brigadier) Edward Hadrill Clayton, OBE, (15934), Royal Artillery.
- Colonel (temporary Brigadier) Harold Powell Crosland, OBE, MC, TD, (20920), late Royal Artillery.
- Colonel (temporary Brigadier) Henry Percivall Currey (20177), late The Royal Ulster Rifles.
- Lieutenant-Colonel (temporary Brigadier) Ernest Edward Down (23809), The King's Shropshire Light Infantry.
- Colonel (temporary Brigadier) Oliver Frederick Gillilan Hogg (4083), late Royal Artillery.
- Colonel Norman Cecil Joseph, TD, Staffordshire Home Guard.
- Lieutenant-Colonel (temporary Brigadier) Stephen Lamplugh (6967), Royal Engineers.
- Lieutenant-Colonel (temporary Colonel) Harold Lancelot Roy Matthews (106278), General List.
- Colonel (temporary Brigadier) George Travers Nugee, DSO, MC, (8224), late Royal Artillery.
- Lieutenant-Colonel (temporary Brigadier) Ronald Stuart Park, New Zealand Military Forces.
- Colonel (temporary Brigadier) Hugh Upton Richards (1626), late The West Yorkshire Regiment (The Prince of Wales's Own).
- Colonel William Robb, DSO, MC, (14247), late The North Staffordshire Regiment (The Prince of Wales's).
- Colonel (temporary Brigadier) Alfred Travers Fairclough Smith, MC, BSc (Eng), AMInstCE, Indian Army.
- Colonel (temporary Major-General) Victor Paul Hildebrand Stantke, OBE, Australian Military Forces.
- Colonel (temporary Brigadier) Derek Jarrett Steevens, MC, (5389), late Royal Artillery.
- Lieutenant-Colonel (temporary Brigadier) William Henry Stratton (27948), Royal Engineers.
- Lieutenant-Colonel (temporary Brigadier) William Ernest Tyndall, MC, MB, DPH, (24193), Royal Army Medical Corps.
- Chief Commander (temporary Senior Controller) Leslie Violet Lucy Evelyn Whateley (192035), Auxiliary Territorial Service.
- Colonel (temporary Brigadier) Edward Stephen Bruce Williams (1554), late The Rifle Brigade (Prince Consort's Own).
- Colonel John Workman Wintringham, Lincolnshire Home Guard.
- Colonel Francis John Wymer, Southern Railway Home Guard.

Royal Air Force

- Air Vice-Marshal George Brindley Aufrere Baker, CB, MC.
- Acting Air Vice-Marshal Eric Bourne Coulter Betts, DSC, DFC.
- Air Commodore Thomas Edward Drowley, OBE.
- Air Commodore Wilfrid Henry Dunn, DSC.
- Air Commodore Thomas Walker Elmhirst, AFC.
- Air Commodore Harry Aitken Hewat, MB, ChB, DTM & H.
- Air Commodore Colin Winterbotham Weedon.
- Acting Air Commodore Donald Clifford Tyndall Bennett, DSO, Royal Air Force Volunteer Reserve.
- Acting Air Commodore John Auguste Boret, OBE, MC, AFC.
- Acting Air Commodore Willett Amalric Bowen Bowen-Buscarlet, DFC.
- Acting Air Commodore Alfred Cecil Critchley, CMG, DSO, Royal Air Force Volunteer Reserve.
- Acting Air Commodore John Astley Gray, DFC, GM.
- Acting Air Commodore Harold Alfred Haines, OBE, DFC.
- Acting Air Commodore Ronald Ivelaw-Chapman, DFC, AFC.
- Acting Air Commodore John Lawrance Kirby.
- Group Captain Charles Henry Appleton, DSO, DFC.
- Group Captain Walter Lloyd Dawson.
- Group Captain Edgar Harry Hooper.
- Group Captain Edmund Cuthbert Hudleston.
- Group Captain Sir Henry Nigel St. Valery Norman, Bt., Auxiliary Air Force Reserve of Officers (deceased) (appointment to be dated 18 May 1943).
- Group Captain Douglas Macfadyen.
- Group Captain Bryan Vernon Reynolds.
- Acting Group Captain Gareth Guilbert Barrett.
- Acting Group Captain Guy Alfred Bolland, Reserve of Air Force Officers.
- Acting Group Captain Ronald Beresford Lees, DFC.
- Acting Group Captain William Kent Le May, OBE, Auxiliary Air Force.
- Acting Group Captain Denis Osmond Mulholland, AFC.
- Acting Group Captain Geoffrey Nicolas Ernest Tindal-Carill-Worsley.
- Acting Group Captain Maurice Wilbraham Sandford Robinson.
- Acting Group Captain William Proctor Wilson, Royal Air Force Volunteer Reserve.
- Acting Air Commodore John Patrick Joseph McCauley, Royal Australian Air Force.
- Group Captain Griffith James Powell, Royal Canadian Air Force.
- Acting Group Officer Selena Frances Wynne-Eyton, Women's Auxiliary Air Force.

Civil Division

- Robert Moir Allardyce, OBE, MC, JP, Director of Education for Glasgow.
- Peter Frederick Astill, Chairman of the Leicestershire War Agricultural Executive Committee.
- Brigadier-General Atwell Charles Baylay, DSO, Chairman of the Engineering and Allied Employers' Association, Birmingham, Wolverhampton and Stafford District.
- John Louis Beddington, Director, Films Division, Ministry of Information.
- Gordon Charles Boulter, Chief Engineer Officer, Merchant Navy.
- Herbert Broadley, Deputy Secretary, Ministry of Food.
- Walter Carter, Chairman of the London Management Committee (War Damage Claims), Board of Trade.
- Roy Chadwick, FRSA, FRAeS, Chief Designer and Director, A. V. Roe and Co. Ltd.
- Herbert Comfort Chatfield, Deputy Accountant General, Ministry of Health.
- Marjorie Sophie Cox, OBE, Assistant Secretary, Ministry of Pensions.
- Melville Dinwiddie, DSO, OBE, MC, Scottish Director, British Broadcasting Corporation.
- Frederic John Dixon, MInstCE, MIMechE, Engineer-in-Chief to the South Staffordshire Water Works Company.
- James Raffan Fiddes, JP, Actuary, Glasgow Savings Bank, Honorary Secretary, Trustee Savings Banks Association.
- Ernest Sydney Grumell, MIME, Chairman of the Fuel Efficiency Committee.
- Henry Lewis Guy, DSc, MIMechE, MInstCE, FRS, Chairman of the Gun Design Committee of the Scientific Advisory Council.
- Henry Harrison Hardy, MBE, (Major, late the Rifle Brigade), Headmaster of Shrewsbury School.
- Christiana Hartley, JP. For public services in Southport.
- Captain Edward Holland, Master, Merchant Navy.
- James Spencer Rollings, Chairman Anti-Glare Advisory Committee of the British Iron and Steel Federation. For services to Civil Defence.
- Professor Geoffrey Jefferson, MS, FRCS, FRFPS, Consultant Adviser to the Minister of Health in Neuro-Surgery.
- Inez Mary Jenkins, Assistant Director, Women's Land Army.
- Professor John Jewkes, Deputy Director General, Statistics and Programmes, Ministry of Aircraft Production.
- John Clague Joughin, OBE, Assistant Director of Contract Work (Supplies), Admiralty. Lately Manager, Admiralty Constructive Department, Malta.
- Preston Kitchen, OBE, Air Raid Precautions Controller and Town Clerk, Middlesbrough. For services to Civil Defence.
- Thomas Slater Lamb, Director of Social Welfare, Bristol. For services to Civil Defence.
- Kenneth Lancelot Macaulay, OBE, Finance Officer, Ministry of War Transport.
- Thomas Frazer Mackie, Chairman, James Mackie and Sons Ltd., Belfast.
- Henry Main, JP, Managing Director, Caledon Shipbuilding and Engineering Company Ltd. Regional Director (Merchant Shipbuilding and Repairs), East of Scotland.
- Wilfrid Meynell. For services to literature.
- Lieutenant-Colonel Arthur Erskine-Murray, DSO, DL, Secretary, Warwick Territorial Army and Air Force Association.
- Alan Colin Campbell Orde, Operations Director, British Overseas Airways Corporation.
- Albert William Thomas Orsborn, Commissioner of the Salvation Army. For services to the Forces.
- Arthur Joseph Palmer, Director of Vickers-Armstrongs Ltd.
- Captain John Sidney Paterson, Principal Officer, Southern Region, Ministry of Home Security.
- Captain Francis Richard Jonathan Peel, MC, Chief Constable of Essex.
- Captain Bernard Hartley Peter, Board of Trade Representative, South Western Regional Board. Chairman, Railway Brakes and Signalling Export Group.
- Captain Cyril Hamley Petherick, OBE, Principal Assistant Secretary, Ministry of Finance, Northern Ireland.
- Reginald Kirshaw Pierson, OBE, Chief Designer, Vickers-Armstrongs Ltd. (Aircraft).
- Henry Pratt, Chief Engineer Officer, Merchant Navy.
- Allan Stephen Quartermaine, MC, Chief Engineer, Great Western Railway Company.
- Percy John Ridd, Deputy Engineer-in-Chief, General Post Office.
- Vernon Alec Murray Robertson, MC, (Colonel, Royal Engineers, Territorial Army), Engineer-in-Chief, London Passenger Transport Board.
- Charles Stanley Robinson, Director-General of Filling Factories, Ministry of Supply.
- Major Robert William Sharpe, JP, DL, Chairman of the Agricultural Executive Committee for Berwickshire.
- George Harry Shreeve, Assistant Secretary, War Office, Command Secretary, Northern Command.
- Arthur William Smith, General Manager and Secretary, Birmingham Gas Department.
- Colonel George Francis Taylor, Civil Assistant, General Staff, War Office.
- Barnes Neville Wallis, MInstCE, FRAeS, Assistant Chief Designer, Vickers-Armstrongs Ltd.
- Group Captain Frederick William Winterbotham. Employed in a Department of the Foreign Office.
- Councillor Charles Edward Worthington, JP, (Flight Lieutenant, Royal Air Force Volunteer Reserve), Air Raid Precautions Controller, Leicester City.
- Lieutenant-Colonel William Warren Zambra, Secretary, Imperial Communications Advisory Committee.
- William Porter Palgrave Archdale, Manager of the Sudan Plantations Syndicate.
- Harold Leslie Bowes, a British subject resident in Valparaiso.
- Cyril Hubert Cane, MBE, His Majesty's Consul-General in Detroit.
- Lieutenant-Colonel Wallace Adelbert Lyon, OBE, Political Officer Northern Area in Iraq.
- Donald MacNaughton MacRae, OBE, a British subject resident in Buenos Aires.
- John Mellor Pattinson, General Manager of the Anglo-Persian Oil Co. in Abadan.
- Lieutenant-Colonel William Alexander Collins, DSO. For services in organising hospitality to oversea Forces.
- Thomas Brereton Kennan, MC, Deputy Resident Commissioner and Government Secretary, Basutoland.
- Geoffrey Archer Walch, JP, Director of Civil Defence for the State of Tasmania.
- Major Nawab Abdul Majid Khan, Diler Jang Bahadur, Nawab of Savanur.
- Kenneth George John Headington, Agent, Imperial Bank of India, Cawnpore, United Provinces.
- Jnanendra Nath Mukherjee, DSc, Professor of Chemistry, Calcutta University.
- Sri Diwan Bahadur Vangavail Shanmuga Mudaliyar, Dubash, the South Indian Export Company, Ltd., Madras.
- James Ratcliffe Walton, Deputy Iron and Steel Import Controller, Department of Supply, Government of India.
- Leonard Brown Naylor, Burma Frontier Service, Deputy Commissioner, Chin Hills.
- Vivian Buchanan Atkinson, Chief Engineer, Kenya and Uganda Railways and Harbours Administration.
- Robert Annesley Godwin-Austen, Colonial Survey Service, Director of Land Registration and Surveys, Cyprus.
- Algernon Bragg, Colonial Audit Service, Auditor, Kenya.
- Herbert John Lowe, MRCVS, Colonial Veterinary Service, Director of Veterinary Services, Tanganyika Territory.
- Theophilus Albert Marryshow. For public services in Grenada, Windward Islands.
- Captain Clinton Austin Reed, OBE, VD, Comptroller of Customs, Barbados.
- Alexander Stewart Richardson, Colonial Agricultural Service, Director of Agriculture, Nyasaland Protectorate.
- Togbi Sri II, OBE, The Awame Fia of Awuna, Gold Coast.

Honorary Commander

- Francis Khayat, Puisne Judge, Supreme Court, Palestine.

==== Officer of the Order of the British Empire (OBE) ====
Military Division

Royal Navy

- Captain Alfred O'Leary, (Retd.).
- Engineer Captain Sydney Greville West, DSC, (Retd.).
- Commander (Acting Captain) John Noel Sparks.
- Commander Henry Villiers Briscoe, (Retd.).
- Commander Henry Norman Scott Brown.
- Commander Alan FitzRoy Campbell.
- Commander Harold William Fawcett, (Retd.).
- Commander Gordon Fraser Hannay, (Retd.).
- Commander Thomas Nevil Masterman.
- Commander Samuel Henry Taylor, (Retd.).
- Lieutenant Commander (Acting Commander) Henry Arthur Adeane Mallet, (Retd.).
- Commander Harry Robertson Lane, RD, Royal Naval Reserve.
- Commander Alfred Victor Knight, DSC, RD, Royal Australian Naval Reserve (Seagoing).
- Acting Commander Arthur Hugh Dyer, Royal Naval Reserve.
- Acting Commander Vladimir Wolfson, Royal Naval Volunteer Reserve.
- Lieutenant-Commander (Acting Commander) Robert Bagster Atlee Hunt, Royal Australian Navy.
- Engineer Commander Francis Henry Smith, (Retd.).
- Engineer Commander William Mathison, RD, Royal Naval Reserve (Retd.).
- Commander (E) Alan Kirkconnel.
- Commander (E) Francis Egerton Lefroy.
- Commander (E) William Godfrey Pulvertaft.
- Commander (E) Cecil Tudor Phillips, RD, Royal Naval Reserve.
- Acting Commander (E) Albert Cyril Kirkland Laman.
- Acting Temporary Commander (E) George Stephenson Hepton, Royal Naval Reserve.
- Surgeon Commander William Arthur Hopkins, MD, BCh, MRCP.
- Constructor Commander Alfred John Sims, Royal Corps of Naval Constructors.
- Paymaster Commander Jack Richmond Allfrey.
- Paymaster Commander Hubert Percival Chapman.
- Paymaster Commander William James Grierson Prophit.
- Paymaster Commander Charles Edward Cecil Tomkins.
- Paymaster Commander Nevil Bruce Whiteley Rose, RD, Royal Naval Reserve.
- Major (Brevet Lieutenant Colonel) (Acting Colonel) Sidney George Barten Paine, Royal Marines.
- Lieutenant-Commander Norman Warren Fisher.
- Lieutenant-Commander Arthur Alfred Havers.
- Lieutenant-Commander Charles Savage Ewbank Lansdown.
- Acting Temporary Lieutenant-Commander Frederick Arthur Matson, Royal Naval Reserve.
- Temporary Lieutenant-Commander (E) Percy Warwick Davies, Royal Naval Reserve.
- Acting Temporary Paymaster Lieutenant-Commander Richard Eltonhead Rankin, Royal Naval Reserve.
- Captain Richard Francis Verity Griffiths, Royal Marines.
- Elsie May French, Chief Officer, Women's Royal Naval Service.

Army

- Senior Commander (temporary Chief Commander) Katharine Acland, MBE, (192025), Auxiliary Territorial Service.
- Lieutenant-Colonel George James Alexander, MC, MB, FRCS, (123120), Royal Army Medical Corps.
- Major (temporary Lieutenant-Colonel) Ernest Bader, AMIMechE, AMIEE, (17809), Royal Engineers.
- Major (temporary Lieutenant-Colonel) George Boyd Balfour, DSO, (118487), Pioneer Corps.
- Lieutenant-Colonel William Stacpoole Barroll, Royal Indian Army Service Corps.
- Major Walter Samuel Beddall (11494), Army Educational Corps.
- Lieutenant-Colonel Frederick Archibald Bell, MC, Perthshire Home Guard.
- Captain (temporary Major) Leslie Francis Berry, Corps of Indian Engineers, Indian Army.
- Major (temporary Lieutenant-Colonel) George Patrick Demaine Blacker (34570), Royal Artillery.
- Lieutenant-Colonel (temporary Colonel) William Martin Blagden (6553), Royal Engineers.
- Lieutenant-Colonel (temporary Colonel) Harry Allan Bleach, MC, (22488), Royal Artillery.
- Lieutenant-Colonel Francis Thomas Blennerhassett, Warwickshire Home Guard.
- Lieutenant-Colonel (temporary Brigadier) Douglas Harry Bond, MVO, AMIMechE, (26102), Royal Army Service Corps.
- Colonel John Banks Brady, DSO, ED, Southern Rhodesia Defence Force.
- Lieutenant-Colonel Gerald Wilberforce Graham-Bowman, MC, Cumberland Home Guard.
- Lieutenant-Colonel Henry James Brooks, DSO, MC, TD, (23533), The Hampshire Regiment.
- Lieutenant-Colonel Humphrey Bullock, Indian Army.
- Major (temporary Lieutenant-Colonel) Bernard Maurice Gardner Butterworth (4320), Royal Artillery.
- Major (temporary Lieutenant-Colonel) John Norman Cheney (10803), The King's Royal Rifle Corps.
- Lieutenant-Colonel Nigel Keppel Charteris, CMG, DSO, Hampshire Home Guard.
- Major (temporary Lieutenant-Colonel) Reginald Evelyn Scott Clephan (122508), Royal Corps of Signals.
- Lieutenant-Colonel (Commissary) Arthur William Collinson, Indian Army Ordnance Corps.
- Major (temporary Lieutenant-Colonel) Henry Roubiliac Roignier Conder (38590), The Royal Norfolk Regiment.
- Major (temporary Lieutenant-Colonel) Antony Browning Coote (34717), The Northamptonshire Regiment.
- Major (local Lieutenant-Colonel) Colin Campbell Corkhill, TD, (29940), Royal Tank Regiment.
- Lieutenant-Colonel John Southwell Crosby, MC, London Home Guard.
- Lieutenant-Colonel Geoffrey Bruce Dawson, MC, Monmouthshire Home Guard.
- Colonel Robert Dickie, MC, (9995), late The Argyll & Sutherland Highlanders (Princess Louise's).
- Major (temporary Lieutenant-Colonel) Frederick Knowles Escritt (26278), Royal Army Medical Corps.
- Lieutenant-Colonel (Temporary Colonel) John Victor Faviell, MC, (15145), The Lincolnshire Regiment.
- Major (acting Brigadier) Randle Guy Feilden (37199), Coldstream Guards.
- Lieutenant-Colonel George Richard Samuel Fisher, Staffordshire Home Guard.
- Major (temporary Lieutenant-Colonel) Charles Robert Gerard, DSO, (30290), Grenadier Guards.
- Lieutenant-Colonel William Gibson, DSO, MC, Buckinghamshire Home Guard.
- Lieutenant-Colonel (temporary Colonel) Howard Courtney Goodfellow, AMIMechE, (13961), Royal Army Service Corps.
- Lieutenant-Colonel (temporary Brigadier) Ronald Gordon, Indian Army.
- Lieutenant-Colonel William Edward Grace, Sussex Home Guard.
- Major (temporary Lieutenant-Colonel) John Basil Alers Hankey (17734), The King's Own Scottish Borderers.
- Lieutenant-Colonel Alan Scott Hardie, TD, (32891), Royal Artillery.
- Major (temporary Lieutenant-Colonel) James Frederic Bowtell-Harris, Indian Army.
- Major (temporary Lieutenant-Colonel) (acting Colonel) Lionel Herbert Harris, TD, MSc, MIEE, (33028), Royal Corps of Signals.
- Major (temporary Lieutenant-Colonel) James Patrick Haugh (23508), Royal Engineers.
- Lieutenant-Colonel (acting Brigadier) Maurice Leslie Hayne, 17th Dogra Regiment, Indian Army.
- Junior Commander (temporary Chief Commander) Rosamund Mary Hicks (192907), Auxiliary Territorial Service.
- Lieutenant-Colonel Bassett Fardell Hornor, DSO, Norfolk Home Guard.
- Major Stanley Harold Jardine, London Home Guard.
- Lieutenant-Colonel Frank Arthur Jenks, MC, London Home Guard.
- Lieutenant-Colonel & Brevet Colonel John Paul Jordan, MC, TD, (22339), Royal Artillery.
- Lieutenant-Colonel George Edgar Laing, MM, (18363), Royal Artillery.
- Lieutenant-Colonel Alec Sydney Lambert, MC, East Riding Home Guard.
- Lieutenant-Colonel (local Colonel) Alexander Stalker Lancaster, 10th Gurkha Rifles, Indian Army.
- Major (temporary Lieutenant-Colonel) John Selwyn Brooke Lloyd (91552), Royal Artillery.
- Major Ernest Lionel Mack, VD, Ceylon Light Infantry.
- Major (temporary Lieutenant-Colonel) Richard Thomas Ringwood MacManaway (98888), Royal Army Service Corps.
- Major Malik Gul Sher Khan Noon, Indian Army.
- Lieutenant-Colonel (local Colonel) Francis Hay Mardall, Indian Army.
- Major (temporary Lieutenant-Colonel) Frank Mills, MC, (89612), Royal Artillery.
- Major Nils Henry Moller (49335), The Middlesex Regiment (Duke of Cambridge's Own).
- Lieutenant-Colonel (temporary Brigadier) Harold Arthur David Murray, TD, DL, (7738), Royal Artillery.
- Senior Commander (temporary Chief Commander) Josephine Mary Murray (192085), Auxiliary Territorial Service.
- Major Robert Charles William Neale, West Riding Home Guard.
- Lieutenant-Colonel Samuel Edward Norris, DSO, Gloucestershire Home Guard.
- Major (acting Brigadier) Brian Palliser Tiegue O'Brien, MC, 4th (Prince of Wales's Own) Gurkha Rifles, Indian Army.
- Lieutenant-Colonel Edmund Robertson Page, 19th Hyderabad Regiment, Indian Army.
- Colonel Robert Frederick Pearson, TD, Army Cadet Force.
- Lieutenant-Colonel Harold William Perryer, MBE, AMIMechE, AMIEE, (14334), Royal Engineers.
- Major (temporary Lieutenant-Colonel) William Buckley Nicholl Roderick (42704), Coldstream Guards.
- Major (temporary Lieutenant-Colonel) the Lord Russell of Liverpool, MC, (10932), Extra Regimentally Employed List.
- Captain (temporary Major) Khan Mohammed Sana, Indian Medical Service, Indian Army.
- Lieutenant-Colonel Arthur Lewis Scaife, MC, (45303), The Hampshire Regiment.
- Major Robert Scarth, Orkney Home Guard.
- Major Edward Owen Sewell, MC, (69882), The South Lancashire Regiment (Prince of Wales's Volunteers).
- Major (temporary Lieutenant-Colonel) Frank Victor Sharpe, Australian Military Forces.
- Lieutenant-Colonel Maurice Rowton Simpson, TD, (7003), Royal Artillery.
- Lieutenant-Colonel Frank William Sopper, Invernessshire Home Guard.
- Captain (temporary Major) James Francis Stallard (139025), The Devonshire Regiment.
- Lieutenant-Colonel Arthur William Stericker, DSO, Cornwall Home Guard.
- Lieutenant-Colonel Henry Howard Stoney, DSO, Wiltshire Home Guard.
- Major (temporary Lieutenant-Colonel) Ralph Francis Ewart Stoney (23691), Royal Engineers.
- Lieutenant-Colonel James Knights Trench, West Riding Home Guard.
- Major (temporary Lieutenant-Colonel) Kenneth Hugh Treseder (30955), Royal Corps of Signals.
- Major (acting Lieutenant-Colonel) Cecil Douglas Lovett Turner, Royal Indian Army Service Corps.
- Major (temporary Lieutenant-Colonel) Edward Roger Vickers, DSO, MC, (15368), The West Yorkshire Regiment (The Prince of Wales's Own).
- Major (temporary Lieutenant-Colonel) Frederick William Sinclair Walker (39980), Royal Army Ordnance Corps.
- Major (temporary) John Oldknow Widdows, MC, Ceylon Defence Force.
- Chief Principal Matron Louisa Jane Wilkinson, RRC, (206505), Queen Alexandra's Imperial Military Nursing Service.
- Colonel Ivan Stuart Wilson, MC, ED, FRCS, New Zealand Military Forces.
- Senior Commander (temporary Chief Commander) Alba Windham (192820), Auxiliary Territorial Service.
- Lieutenant-Colonel Robert Emmet Winning, Australian Military Forces.

Royal Air Force

- Wing Commander George Burges, DFC, (33225).
- Wing Commander Albert Avion Case (37035).
- Wing Commander William Ivor Grantham (05187).
- Wing Commander George Douglas Green (18169).
- Wing Commander (now Acting Group Captain) George Henry Foss (36024).
- Wing Commander Harold Edmund Hills (90463), Auxiliary Air Force.
- Wing Commander Lionel Arthur Jackson (31062).
- Wing Commander William Kidd (75529), Royal Air Force Volunteer Reserve.
- Wing Commander Crystal Lorimer (11099).
- Wing Commander George Sydney Arthur Parnaby (34173).
- Wing Commander (now Acting Group Captain) George Cannon Pinkerton, DFC, (90160), Auxiliary Air Force.
- Wing Commander Frederick Ernest Rosier, DSO, (37425).
- Wing Commander Reginald Bryson Wardman, AFC, (29028).
- Acting Wing Commander George Robert Charles Baker (31482).
- Acting Wing Commander John Roby Bloxam, DFC, (41544), Reserve of Air Force Officers.
- Acting Wing Commander Basil Drewe, MC, (76053), Royal Air Force Volunteer Reserve.
- Acting Wing Commander George Herbert Laurence Easterbrook (75885), Royal Air Force Volunteer Reserve.
- Acting Wing Commander William Reginald Farnes (40097), Reserve of Air Force Officers.
- Acting Wing Commander Ralph Hiscox (90083), Auxiliary Air Force.
- Acting Wing Commander John Graham Balfour Hutchings (79097), Royal Air Force Volunteer Reserve.
- Acting Wing Commander Asher Lee (77734), Royal Air Force Volunteer Reserve.
- Acting Wing Commander Derek Fitzgerald Massy (72888), Royal Air Force Volunteer Reserve.
- Acting Wing Commander George Percy Scott Pollard (79192), Royal Air Force Volunteer Reserve.
- Acting Wing Commander Arthur George Sutton (31165).
- Acting Wing Commander Edward George Wooberry (43652).
- Honorary Wing Commander Alexander Spurgeon Fletcher, Royal Air Force Volunteer Reserve.
- Squadron Leader Harold Adams (90099), Auxiliary Air Force.
- Squadron Leader Edgar Clifford Graham Badcock (19074), Royal Air Force Volunteer Reserve.
- Squadron Leader Julian Salmon (73384), Royal Air Force Volunteer Reserve.
- Squadron Leader Arthur Courtenay Snow (06135).
- Acting Squadron Leader Herbert Frank Bishop, AFC, (43464).
- Acting Squadron Leader Rowland David George (75777), Royal Air Force Volunteer Reserve.
- Acting Squadron Leader William James Grace (80664).
- Acting Squadron Leader Guy Henry Harley (80578), Royal Air Force Volunteer Reserve.
- Acting Squadron Leader Archibald Walter Dixon How (43877).
- Acting Squadron Leader Arthur Neville Jarvis (44006).
- Acting Squadron Leader Norman Walter Kearon (31334).
- Acting Squadron Leader Anthony Stuart Linney (41717), Reserve of Air Force Officers.
- Acting Squadron Leader Gordon William Sydney Rice (79977), Royal Air Force Volunteer Reserve.
- Acting Squadron Leader Leonard William Wells (76395), Royal Air Force Volunteer Reserve.
- Wing Commander Henry Talbot Hammond, (Aus.180), Royal Australian Air Force.
- Acting Squadron Leader Clyde Gladstone O'Dea (Aus.407048), Royal Australian Air Force.
- Wing Commander Michael Keogh, AM, Royal New Zealand Air Force.
- Wing Commander William Hives Eastwood, Southern Rhodesian Air Force.

Civil Division

- Maurice Edward Adams, AMInstCE, Admiralty Superintending Civil Engineer, South Africa.
- Lionel Raymond Allen, DSO, Chairman, Hosiery and Knitwear Export Group.
- Jonah Arnold, JP, Chairman, Neath Employment Committee.
- Walter Martin Ash, FRCS(Ed), MB, DPH, County Medical Officer of Health for Derbyshire. For services to Civil Defence.
- Margery Alice Creswick Atkinson, ARRC, Civil Defence Training Officer, Women's Voluntary Services for Civil Defence.
- Robert Atkinson, Chief Engineer Officer, Merchant Navy.
- Samuel Baker, Chief Engineer Officer, Merchant Navy.
- Councillor Lionel Frank Bartle. For public services in Caernarvonshire.
- Thomas Henry Barton, Managing Director and Chairman, Barton Transport Ltd.
- Charles Edward Batey, Assistant Printer to the University of Oxford.
- Leslie Herbert Bedford, Chief Research Engineer, A. C. Cossor Ltd.
- Edward Pater Bell, DCM, Principal, General Post Office.
- Captain John Leslie Bennet, Chairman of the Area Council, British Legion, Northern Ireland.
- Captain Gordon William Bennett, Captain of Aircraft, British Overseas Airways Corporation.
- Alderman Sydney George Bevan, JP, Chairman of Goole Employment Committee.
- Thomas William Birnie, Chief Engineer Officer, Merchant Navy.
- Arnold du Toit Bottomley, Group Engineer, Group 3, London Civil Defence Region.
- John Brockis, Manager of the County Supplies Department, West Riding of Yorkshire County Council. For services to Civil Defence.
- Captain Samuel Browne, Master, Merchant Navy.
- Frank Leonard Bunn, Chief Constable of Stoke-on-Trent.
- Robert Black Carnegie, County Road Surveyor, Inverness.
- Norman William Castle, Acting Borough Engineer and Surveyor of the Folkestone Borough Council. For services to Civil Defence.
- Arthur Stanley Charlton, Senior Regional Officer, Ministry of Health.
- Cecil Harry Chester, MIMechE, MInstGasE, Regional Gas Engineering Adviser, South West Region.
- Henry Birch Clark, Principal, Ministry of Labour and National Service.
- Captain William Lancelot Clibborn, Master, Merchant Navy.
- Ben Cockram, Political Secretary, Office of the High Commissioner in the Union of South Africa for His Majesty's Government in the United Kingdom.
- Joy Frances Ivan Colvin, Chairman and Honorary Organising Secretary, Royal Naval War Libraries.
- Kathleen Vera Bowerbank Coni, Matron of the Hull Municipal Maternity Hospital. Deputy President of the College of Midwives.
- George Henry Cook, Chief Constable of Sunderland.
- Harold John Crowe, Principal, Scottish Home Department.
- William Crowson, Special Director and Works Superintendent, Vickers-Armstrongs Ltd.
- Captain Rhys Wiltshire Davies, MBE, FSI, FAI, Chief Lands Officer, Air Ministry.
- Captain Ernest Richard Davis, Commodore Master of Cable & Wireless Ltd.
- Elizabeth Dawson, County Director, British Red Cross Society (Scottish Branch).
- Philip Ivor Dee, FRS, Principal Scientific Officer, Telecommunications Research Establishment, Ministry of Aircraft Production.
- Moira Whitley Dennehy, Principal Officer, Ministry of Economic Warfare.
- Charles Matthew Derricks, Chief Engineer Officer, Merchant Navy.
- Alderman Ernest John Dobson, JP, Mayor of Deal and Chairman of the Emergency Committee. For services to Civil Defence.
- Sidney Herbert Dodd, Secretary, British Pottery Manufacturers' Federation Chairman, Glazed Tile Manufacturers' Association.
- Bernard Arthur Duncan, AMInstCE, AMIMechE, ARFAeS, Superintendent, Vickers-Armstrongs Ltd.
- Peter Dunn, Fire Staff Officer, Grade I, Scottish Region, National Fire Service.
- Robert Meredydd Wynne-Edwards, DSO, MC, Director of Labour and Plant, Ministry of Works.
- Captain Thomas Charles Enos, Master, Merchant Navy.
- Captain William John Enright, RD (Commander, Royal Naval Reserve, Retd.), Master, Merchant Navy.
- Captain Arthur Eves, Master, Merchant Navy.
- Alexander Fairley, Chief Engineer Officer, Merchant Navy.
- Edward Farminer, Chief Engineer Officer, Merchant Navy.
- Reginald Hugh Faro, Chief Engineer, Pickfords Ltd.
- Hugh Ferrier, Managing Director, Rankin & Blackmore Ltd.
- William Frame, Chief Engineer Officer, Merchant Navy.
- Captain Ernest Edmund Fresson, Managing Director, Scottish Airways Ltd.
- Professor Frederic Horace Garner, PhD, MSc, MIChemE, FIC, Professor of Oil Engineering and Refining, University of Birmingham.
- Sidney Barrington Gates, Principal Scientific Officer, Royal Aircraft Establishment, Ministry of Aircraft Production.
- Alderman James Gilliland, JP, President of the Durham Miners' Association.
- John Glaisyer, Registrar, Birmingham Probate Registry.
- Councillor Frederick Herbert Baker Gough, Chairman of the Air Raid Precautions Committee, Scunthorpe, and Chairman of the Emergency Committee.
- William Greene, MBE, JP, DL (Colonel, Home Guard), Chairman of the Stoke-on-Trent Cheadle and District War Pensions Committee.
- Councillor Alfred Robert Grindlay, JP, Chairman, Coventry Savings Committee.
- Henry James Haggar, Chief Ship Surveyor, Ministry of War Transport.
- Alfred William Henry Hall, His Majesty's Trade Commissioner (Grade 2) for Southern and Northern Rhodesia and Nyasaland.
- Major Bernard Peace Hall, Local Welfare Officer, Northern Command.
- Robert Hannah, Chief Engineer Officer, Merchant Navy.
- George William Harriman, Production Manager, Austin Motor Co. Ltd.
- Alick Robin Walsham Harrison, lately Private Secretary to the Minister of Food; now Deputy Director of Public Relations, Ministry of Food.
- William Arthur Harrison, Borough Engineer and Surveyor, Bootle. For services to Civil Defence.
- Captain William Horatio Hartman, Master, Merchant Navy.
- Surgeon Captain Gerald Silvester Harvey, MB, BCh, Royal Navy (Retd.), Senior Instructor (Medical) and Deputy Commandant, Ministry of Home Security School, Falfield.
- Charles Frederick Haynes, Assistant Accountant and Comptroller General, Board of Inland Revenue.
- Arthur John Hewitt, General Manager, Coventry Gauge & Tool Co. Ltd.
- Harold Hillier, MIMechE, Director and Chief Executive Engineer, G. & J. Weir Ltd.
- Arthur Reginald Gorman Hudson, General Manager, Stores Department, Joint War Organisation of the British Red Cross Society and Order of St. John.
- Mark Talbut Hughes, County Treasurer, West Sussex County Council.
- Thomas Frederick Hurley, AMInstCE, Principal Scientific Officer, Fuel Research Station, Department of Scientific and Industrial Research.
- Stacey Ratcliffe Ingold, Chief Engineer Officer, Merchant Navy.
- James William Innes, Chief Engineer Officer, Merchant Navy.
- Humphrey Jamison, General Secretary, Ulster Farmers' Union.
- Captain David Jacob Jones, Master, Merchant Navy.
- Captain Frederick Arthur Kennett, Master, Merchant Navy.
- Captain Thomas Arthur Kent, Master, Merchant Navy.
- Harold Charles Kenworthy, employed in a Department of the Foreign Office.
- Lawrence William Kershaw, AMInstCE, Principal, Leicester College of Technology and Commerce.
- Alfred Lionel Kewney, MINA, Director and Manager, Amos & Smith Ltd.
- James Charles Patrick Kinsman (Captain, Territorial Army, Retd.), Senior Legal Assistant, Office of HM Procurator General and Treasury Solicitor.
- Major Charles Henry Maxwell Knight, Civil Assistant, General Staff, War Office.
- Captain Charles Rolls Knight, Master, Merchant Navy.
- George Harry Knighton, Principal Cost Officer, War Office.
- George Palmer Laidlaw, Chairman of the Glasgow South Side Advisory Committee and of the Glasgow Council for Community Service in Unemployment.
- Barbara Katharine Lea, JP, Chairman, Women's Land Army Committee for Worcestershire.
- Captain Albert Edward Leak, Master, Merchant Navy.
- Captain George Legg, Master, Merchant Navy.
- James Campbell Leslie, Executive Officer, Essex War Agricultural Executive Committee.
- James Miller Linton, Chief Engineer Officer, Merchant Navy.
- Edward Salterne Litteljohn, MRCS, LRCP, Medical Superintendent, London County Council Certified Institution, Epsom.
- Lieutenant-Colonel Claude Darcy George Lyon, DSO, DL, Secretary, Territorial Army Association of the County of Somerset.
- Gerald Bernard McCormick, MBE, Principal Deputy Director of Armament Supply, Admiralty.
- Ranald Macdonald, Senior Inspector, Children's Branch, Home Office.
- Patrick Frederick McFarlan, MB, ChB, FRCS(Ed), Chairman of the Board of Directors, Stirling Royal Infirmary.
- Alexander John Mackenzie, DSC, JP, Provost of the Burgh of Stornoway.
- The Honourable Walter Symington Maclay, MD, MRCP, Medical Superintendent of Mill Hill Emergency Hospital.
- Donald McQueen, Chief Engineer Officer, Merchant Navy.
- Archibald McTaggart, JP, Regional Secretary, Scottish Regional Council, National Federation of Building Trades' Operatives.
- John George Mann, Chief Engineer Officer, Merchant Navy.
- William John Marlow, Director of Machinery Licences, Industrial Supplies Department, Board of Trade.
- William Mason, Air Raid Precautions Officer, Birmingham.
- Councillor Harry Percival Evelyn Mears, Air Raid Precautions Controller and Group Officer, Bournemouth.
- Oliver Mee, MBE, Director of Labour, North-Western Region, Ministry of Fuel and Power.
- Professor Stephen Pascal Mercer, Senior Technical Research Officer, Ministry of Agriculture, Northern Ireland.
- Major David Kinloch Michie, DSO, FSI, JP, DL, Air Raid Precautions Controller, Renfrewshire and Port Glasgow.
- Adam McMorran Millar. For public services in Edinburgh.
- Captain David Miller, Master, Merchant Navy.
- Harold Mills, Chief Controller of Supplies, Navy, Army and Air Force Institutes.
- Captain Frederick Monckton Milnes, Master, Merchant Navy.
- Alexander Alfred Moffat, Town Clerk and Clerk of the Peace, Ipswich. For services to Civil Defence.
- George Mould, Regional Information Officer, North Western Region, Ministry of Information.
- John Wallis Muirhead, Honorary Fire Prevention Adviser, North Western Civil Defence Regional Headquarters.
- Thomas Frederick Mulvenny. For services to seamen's welfare.
- Captain Horace Frederick Moncrieff Munro, Chief Constable of Ayrshire.
- Thomas Murray, Chief Engineer Officer, Merchant Navy.
- Percy Bantock Nevill, FCA. For services to the Boy Scout Movement.
- Joseph William Newsom, Chief Engineer Officer, Merchant Navy.
- Noel Francis Newsome, Director of European Broadcasts, British Broadcasting Corporation.
- Reginald Alfred Nursey, Head of Branch, Ministry of Health.
- Patrick O'Neill, Chief Constable, Kendal, and Air Raid Precautions Controller for Westmorland.
- Captain Ellis Arthur Organ, Master, Merchant Navy.
- Captain Lewis Tecwyn Owen, Master, Merchant Navy.
- Frederick Harold Dunn Page, Signal and Telegraph Engineer, Reading, Great Western Railway Company.
- Captain John Hutt Patterson, Master, Merchant Navy.
- Lieutenant-Colonel John Norman Peck, MC, District Civil Engineer, London, Midland and Scottish Railway Company.
- Bernard William Phillips, Principal, Ministry of Agriculture and Fisheries.
- Alfred Pilling, FCA, JP, Chairman of Bolton Employment Committee.
- William Thomas Pirie, Town Clerk and Air Raid Precautions Controller, Borough of Willesden.
- Charles Montague Power, MC, Inspector of Hospitals, Joint War Organisation of the British Red Cross Society and Order of St. John.
- Alderman Noel Edward Purcell. For public services in Cornwall Vice-Chairman of the Cornwall County Council.
- Samuel Herbert Quayle, Controller, Statistical Office, Board of Customs and Excise.
- Herbert Vere Redman, Director, Far East Division, Ministry of Information.
- Captain David MacQueen Reid, DSC, Master, Merchant Navy.
- Geraldine Elizabeth de Teissier, Lady Rendel, Vice-Chairman, Catholic Women's League Huts and Canteens Committee.
- Lieutenant-Colonel Henry Sacheverell Carleton Richardson, DL, County Commandant, Ulster Special Constabulary.
- Janie Lemey Craig Roberton, President, Glasgow Division, Soldiers', Sailors' and Airmen's Families' Association.
- Captain George Edward Roberts, Master, Merchant Navy.
- Major Gilbert Odell Searle, Superintendent, His Majesty's Norfolk Flax Establishment.
- Captain William Shaw, Master, Merchant Navy.
- Alfred Younger Smellie, MBE, Assistant Director of Accounts, Air Ministry.
- Herbert Smith, Secretary of the Agricultural Seed Trade Association, the Seeds Import Board and the Agricultural Machinery Dealers' Association.
- Harry Adam Smith, Honorary Secretary and Treasurer, Soldiers', Sailors' and Airmen's Help Society for Sussex.
- Olga May Snowden, Chief Matron, City of Birmingham Municipal Hospitals. For services to Civil Defence.
- Cynthia Elinor Beatrix, Countess Spencer, Chairman, Women's Land Army County Committee for Northamptonshire.
- Augustus Neville Spriggs, General Works Manager, Hawker Aircraft Ltd.
- Alice Gwendolen Stokoe, Canteen Organiser under the Kent Education Committee.
- Edgar Rouse Sutcliffe, Chairman and Managing Director, Sutcliffe Speakman & Co. Ltd.
- Richard Courtney Smith Taylor, Deputy Assistant Paymaster-General.
- Councillor William Johnson Taylor, DL, Chairman, Yorkshire Air Training Corps Association.
- Robert Attey Thomas, Chief Engineer Officer, Merchant Navy.
- Captain Percy Dudley Townsend, Master, Merchant Navy.
- George Walter Tripp, Deputy Director, Gun Ammunition Production, Ministry of Supply.
- Captain William Trowsdale, Master, Merchant Navy.
- Henry Edward Upton, MIMechE, MIMarE, Technical Director of Serck Radiators Ltd.
- Cyril Frank Uwins, Chief Test Pilot, Bristol Aeroplane Company.
- Frederick George Webster, Town Clerk, Carlisle.
- Captain Alfred Paget Whitehead, Master, Merchant Navy.
- Captain William Henry Wilcox, Liverpool Pilot, Mersey Docks and Harbour Board.
- Charles Douglas Young, Collector, Dover, Board of Customs and Excise.
- James Thomas Young, Regional Manager, Reading, War Damage Commission.
- Margaret Corbett, a British subject resident in Buenos Aires.
- David Sydney Davies, MD, BCh, FRCS, Physician at His Majesty's Legation at Tehran.
- Cyril Alfred Flux Dundas. Representative of the British Council in the Middle East.
- Louise France, a British subject resident in New York City.
- Robert Gilliland, a British subject resident in Madrid.
- Major Edward Alexander Kinch, Assistant Political Officer, Northern Area, Iraq.
- Captain Thomas Menzies (Retd.), Senior Veterinary Inspector, Sudan Veterinary Service.
- Robert Stuart, a British subject resident in Buenos Aires.
- John Campbell Thomson, MVO, MBE, Superintending Accountant at His Majesty's Embassy in Washington.
- Frederick Hibberd Tomlyn, Assistant Oriental Secretary at His Majesty's Embassy in Cairo.
- George Arnold, DSc, Director of the Rhodesia National Museum.
- John Dennis, President of the National Farmers' Union, Southern Rhodesia.
- Mary Hughes Fotheringham. For social welfare services in the State of South Australia.
- Dorothy Alexandra, Lady James. For services in organising hospitality to oversea Forces.
- Edith Harvey Job, Chairman of the Newfoundland War Comforts Association in London.
- James Vincent Lochrie, employed by the Empire Cotton Growing Corporation in Swaziland.
- Hugh James Martin. For public services in the State of Victoria.
- Sarah Powell. For social welfare services in the State of Victoria, especially to relatives of members of the Forces.
- Cornelius John Swift, lately Postmaster General, Southern Rhodesia.
- George Edmond Brackenbury Abell, Indian Civil Service, Deputy Private Secretary to His Excellency the Viceroy, and lately Secretary to His Excellency the Governor of the Punjab.
- Khan Bahadur Syed Ainuddin, MBE, Dewan, Charkhari State, Central India.
- Wilfred Temple Aldous, VD, JP, Chief Traffic Manager, Bombay, Baroda and Central India Railway, Bombay.
- Sudhangsu Kumar Banerji, Indian Meteorological Service, Superintending Meteorologist, Bombay.
- Rai Bahadur Prafulla Kumar Biswas, Indian Police (Retd.), Additional Special Superintendent of Police, Intelligence Branch, Bengal.
- Brigadier Eric James Boughton, Royal Indian Army Service Corps, Chief Controller of Purchase (Foodstuffs), Food Department, Government of India.
- Brij Narayan, Deputy Financial Adviser, Military Finance, Government of India.
- Major Sir Benjamin Denis Gonville Bromhead, Bt., Commandant, Zhob Militia, Baluchistan.
- Walter Telham Bryant Chairman, Delhi Improvement Trust, and lately Private Secretary to His Excellency the Governor of Madras.
- Sardar Bahadur Sardar Prabh Singh Chawla, MIE, Indian Service of Engineers (Retd.), Chairman, Punjab and North-West Frontier Province National Service Labour Tribunal.
- Lieutenant-Colonel John William Clarke, Special Railway Magistrate, Allahabad, United Provinces.
- Clarence James Creed, MC, Indian Police, Deputy Inspector-General of Police, Southern Range, Patna, Bihar.
- Ghulam Ahmed, Indian Police, Deputy Director, Intelligence Bureau, Home Department, Government of India.
- Colonel William Oscar Henderson, General Manager, Tinplate Company of India, Ltd., Golmuri, Singhbhum District, Bihar.
- Major Robert Thomas Hicks, Indian Medical Service, Civil Surgeon, Cuttack, Orissa.
- Wilfred Owen Penderel Hodder, Indian Police, Assistant to the Inspector-General of Police, Criminal Investigation Department, North-West Frontier Province.
- Arthur Hughes, Indian Civil Service, Labour Commissioner and Registrar of Trade Unions, Bengal.
- Edwin William Hunt, Indian Police, Superintendent of Police, Wireless Officer to the Military Police, Bareilly, United Provinces.
- Ronald Churchill Ivey, Deputy Transportation Superintendent, Great Indian Peninsula Railway, Bombay.
- Jagannath Vishwanath Joshi, Deputy Economic Adviser, Department of Commerce, Government of India.
- Noel Gerald Brudenell Kirwan, Vice-Chairman, Indian Coffee Market Expansion Board, Bangalore.
- John Chalice Lobb, Indian Police, Senior Superintendent of Police, Delhi.
- Herbert Joseph Longley, Manager, Gresham and Craven (India), Ltd., Entally, Calcutta.
- Ronald MacDonald, Manager, Mokalbari Tea Estate, Lakhimpur District, Assam.
- William McLean, MBE, Registrar, University of Madras.
- Alfred Norval Mitchell, Indian Political Service, Political Agent, Orissa States Agency.
- David Ian Rennie Muir, Indian Civil Service, Secretary to the High Commissioner for India in the Union of South Africa.
- Chintamin Govinda Pandit, MB, BS, PhD, DPH, DTM, Director, King Institute, Guindy.
- Claude Frederick Parry, Indian Police, Commandant, Crown Representative's Police, Neemuch, Rajputana.
- Stanley Henry Prater, JP, Member of the Legislative Assembly, Curator, Prince of Wales' Museum of Western India, Bombay.
- Chidambara Aiyar Rajagopala Aiyar, MBE, Controller of Military Accounts, Central Command.
- Gerald George Ray, Indian Police, District Superintendent of Police, Ahmedabad, Bombay.
- Sri Vadamalai Ayyar Seshasayee Ayyar, Managing Director, South Madras Electric Supply Corporation, Ltd., Trichinopoly, Madras.
- Lieutenant-Colonel Jelal Moochool Shah, MBE, Indian Medical Service (Retd.), Superintendent, J.J. Group of Hospitals, Bombay.
- Rajal Narayan Pratap Singh, MBE, Zamindar, Malhajani, Etawah District, United Provinces.
- Vernon Bruce Stainton, Indian Civil Service, Deputy Commissioner, Rawalpindi, Punjab.
- Major David Thompson, Civil Administrator, Kamaran.
- Sydney Ellis White, Manager, Karachi Branch, the National Bank of India, Ltd., Sind.
- Francis Gerald Gribble, Wright Indian Police, Assistant to the Inspector-General of Police, Central Provinces and Berar.
- Major (Temporary Lieutenant-Colonel) Harold Westland Wright, Superintendent, Survey of India.
- Captain Sultan Raja Haider Zaman Khan, MBE, Chief of the Gakhar tribe, Hazara, Assistant Technical Recruiting Officer, Peshawar, North-West Frontier Province.
- John Francis Hunter Nicolson, MC, Indian Service of Engineers, Chief Public Works Officer, Federated Shan States.
- Major Thein, Deputy Director-General, Burma Posts and Telegraphs.
- William Allan, Colonial Agricultural Service, Assistant Director of Agriculture, Northern Rhodesia.
- Norman Frederick Stewart Andrews, Colonial Administrative Service, Assistant Chief Secretary, Northern Rhodesia.
- Ralph Henry Bassett, Colonial Administrative Service, Officer of Class II, Ceylon Civil Service.
- Lieutenant-Colonel Anthony Lawrence Bartolo, Director of Manpower, Malta.
- Roger Calleja, MD, Colonial Medical Service, Senior Medical Officer, Nyasaland Protectorate.
- Edward Baglietto Cottrell. For public services in Gibraltar.
- Captain Eric Reginald Davis. For public services in Kenya.
- Stanley Tristram Dunstan, Vice-Principal, The Prince of Wales's College, Achimota, Gold Coast.
- Edwin Baron Garnett, Colonial Postal Service, Divisional Engineer, Posts and Telegraphs Department, Palestine.
- Ernest Villiers Hunter, LMS. For missionary medical work in the Uganda Protectorate.
- Alexander McDonald Bruce Hutt, Colonial Administrative Service, District Officer, Tanganyika Territory.
- Arthur Oswald Jenkins, Colonial Administrative Service, Deputy Provincial Commissioner, Uganda Protectorate.
- John Roger Kynaston. For public services in Aden.
- Kenneth Gordon Lindsay, Colonial Administrative Service, District Officer, Kenya.
- Donald McBride, lately Ministry of War Transport Representative in Trinidad.
- Captain Reginald Morison Millar, MBE, Superintendent of Nassau Prison, Bahamas.
- Philip Edward Noel Mortimer. For public services in Jamaica.
- Thomas Arthur Manly Nash, Entomologist, Medical Department, Nigeria.
- Wilfred Padley, Representative of the Government of Malta in Egypt, for the Co-ordination of Supplies.
- Sabapathipillai Rajanayagam, Superintending Telecommunications Engineer, Department of Posts and Telegraphs, Ceylon.
- Donald Sturdy, Colonial Agricultural Service, Senior Agricultural Officer, Tanganyika Territory.
- David Arnold Thompson. For public services in the Gold Coast.
- Rachel Trim, Deputy Director of Woman Power, Kenya.
- Robert Orchard Williams, Colonial Agricultural Service, Deputy Director of Agriculture, Trinidad.
- Eustace George Woolford. For public services in British Guiana.
- The Reverend Canon Ruthven Alexanderson Wright, Colonial Chaplain. For social welfare work in Nigeria.

Honorary Officer

- Omar Effendi al Bitar, Chairman of the Municipal Commission of Jaffa, Palestine.

==== Member of the Order of the British Empire (MBE) ====
Military Division

Royal Navy

- Lieutenant-Commander George Hermon Gill, Royal Australian Naval Volunteer Reserve.
- Acting Temporary Lieutenant-Commander Ralph Palmer Robertson Taylor, Royal Naval Reserve.
- Acting Temporary Lieutenant-Commander (A) Basil Alfred Gregory Meads, Royal Naval Volunteer Reserve.
- Lieutenant Ernest Archer.
- Lieutenant Percy Albert Merrin, (Retd.).
- Lieutenant John Edward Poulden.
- Lieutenant William Thomas Huntriss, Royal Naval Reserve.
- Temporary Lieutenant Hesketh John Hesketh, South African Naval Forces (Volunteer).
- Temporary Lieutenant William McNaughton, Royal Naval Reserve.
- Temporary Lieutenant Harry Tarbottan, Royal Naval Reserve.
- Temporary Lieutenant Juan Boyd Bald, Royal Naval Volunteer Reserve.
- Temporary Lieutenant Ralph Dixon Coates, Royal Naval Volunteer Reserve.
- Lieutenant (E) Maurice Aubrey Lawrence Coopper.
- Lieutenant (E) Arthur Edwin Urell.
- Lieutenant (E) Durward John Scott, Royal Naval Reserve.
- Acting Lieutenant-Commander (E) Alexander Charles Lyons Aiken, Royal Naval Reserve.
- Captain (Quartermaster) Bernard James Teeling, Royal Marines.
- Temporary Telegraphist Lieutenant Halson Philpott, Royal New Zealand Navy.
- Temporary Surgeon Lieutenant Charles Gordon Scorer, MB, FRCS, Royal Naval Volunteer Reserve.
- Shipwright Lieutenant Henry Leslie Haines Burden, (Retd.).
- Shipwright Lieutenant John Joseph Cliffe.
- Paymaster Lieutenant Thomas Patrick Gillespie.
- Paymaster Lieutenant Reginald Charles Watson, Royal Australian Navy.
- Temporary Boom Skipper John Evans, Royal Naval Reserve.
- Temporary Skipper Robert Erskine Wetherly, 1059 T.S., Royal Naval Reserve.
- Mr. William James Durrant, Commissioned Gunner.
- Mr. Ernest Roberts, Commissioned Gunner.
- Mr. Harry Kelly, Commissioned Signal Boatswain.
- Mr. Harry George Guy, Commissioned Telegraphist.
- Mr. William Joseph Blackeby, Commissioned Engineer.
- Mr. Charles Rupert Hillard, Commissioned Supply Officer.
- Mr. Thomas Cleave Hawken, Warrant Supply Officer.
- Mr. Cecil Thomas Pomeroy, Temporary Warrant Shipwright.
- Mr. George Harcourt Prentice, Temporary Warrant Master-at-Arms.
- Mr. Henry John Waters, Superintending Clerk, Royal Marines.
- Margaret Rose Rathborne, Acting First Officer, Women's Royal Naval Service.
- Catherine Honor Finch-Noyes, Second Officer, Women's Royal Naval Service.

Army

- No. 4379287 Warrant Officer Class II Company Sergeant Major Thomas Abraham Adams, The Green Howards (Alexandra, Princess of Wales's Own Yorkshire Regiment).
- Subedar Major Mohammed Alam, Corps of Indian Engineers, Indian Army.
- Captain (temporary Major) Richard Malpas Allen (47927), The Royal Norfolk Regiment.
- Captain (temporary Major) John Sinclair Wemyss Arbuthnot (92253), Royal Artillery.
- No. 7305 Warrant Officer Class I Regimental Sergeant Major William Atkins, The Middlesex Regiment (Duke of Cambridge's Own).
- No. 54347 Warrant Officer Class I Staff Sergeant Major Harry Ayrton, Royal Army Service Corps.
- Captain (acting Major) Richard Dennis Ball (52274), The Cheshire Regiment.
- Captain Clive Ormsby Barnes, MB, (97067), Royal Army Medical Corps.
- Captain John Henderson Beale, London Home Guard.
- Captain (temporary Major) Guy Bolsover, MC, (112526), Royal Engineers.
- Major Frank Kirkham Boswell, Lincolnshire Home Guard.
- Captain (Quartermaster) (temporary Major) Gilbert John Boustead (86766), Extra Regimentally Employed List.
- No. 1854536 Regimental Sergeant Major Bernard William Bowles, Royal Engineers.
- Captain (Quartermaster) John Butterworth (101705), Extra Regimentally Employed List.
- Captain (temporary Major) William Byrne, Indian Army.
- Captain Kenneth Somerville Caldwell, MA, PhD, Buckinghamshire Home Guard.
- Captain Cecil Robert Metcalf-Cannon, Cambridgeshire Home Guard.
- Lieutenant (temporary Captain) John Wilde Carrington (100798), Royal Army Service Corps.
- No. 1667066 Warrant Officer Class II Battery Sergeant Major John James Chalmers, Royal Artillery.
- Lieutenant (Assistant Commissary) Sidney Charles Chandler, Indian Army Ordnance Corps.
- No. 4178967 Quartermaster Sergeant (Orderly Room Sergeant) Percy Chard, The Royal Welch Fusiliers.
- No. 5173656 Warrant Officer Class II Battery Sergeant Major Arthur Thomas Chilcott, Royal Artillery.
- Captain Douglas Chisholm, Banffshire Home Guard.
- No. 7594265 Warrant Officer Class II Staff Quartermaster Sergeant Stanley Clarke, Royal Army Ordnance Corps.
- No. 7685491 Warrant Officer Class II Charles Henry Cocking, Intelligence Corps.
- No. 4606156 Warrant Officer Class I Regimental Sergeant Major Sydney Edward Code, Royal Armoured Corps.
- Chaplain to the Forces 4th Class The Reverend Thomas Cook (99981), Royal Army Chaplains' Department.
- Captain (temporary Major) Arthur Robert Cooper (113253), Royal Army Service Corps.
- Captain (temporary Major) Ernest Owen Cooper (77358), Royal Army Pay Corps.
- Subaltern (temporary Junior Commander) Barbara Woodly Davey (223849), Auxiliary Territorial Service.
- Major John Langdon-Davies, Sussex Home Guard.
- Captain Rex Graham Davis, MC, (99135), Royal Tank Regiment, Royal Armoured Corps.
- Captain Sidney Edward Davis, London Home Guard.
- Lieutenant John William Dickson, Orkney Home Guard.
- Lieutenant Ernest Alfred Didcote, Surrey Home Guard.
- Major (Quartermaster) John Pearson Dobson, DCM, MM, (40885), The York and Lancaster Regiment.
- Lieutenant (Quartermaster) William James Dorman (154933), Scots Guards.
- No. 2609380 Warrant Officer Class I, Superintending Clerk Archibald George Douglas, Grenadier Guards.
- Captain (Quartermaster) Frederick James Edwards (98557), The Dorsetshire Regiment.
- Lieutenant-Colonel Lawrence Edwards, Army Cadet Force.
- Lieutenant (temporary Captain) William Edward Epson (185498), General List.
- Lieutenant John Thomas Essam, Cheshire Home Guard.
- Captain (Quartermaster) Charles Stanley Fairbairn (79577), Royal Artillery.
- Warrant Officer Class II, Company Sergeant Major George William Fairbairn, Northumberland Home Guard.
- Lieutenant (temporary Captain) (Deputy Commissary) Albert Farman, Indian Army Corps of Clerks.
- Captain (Quartermaster) Wilfred Jack Fenn (88622), Royal Artillery.
- Lieutenant Henry John Ferguson, Devon Home Guard.
- Lieutenant James McClelland Fergusson (98633), The Cameronians (Scottish Rifles).
- Captain George Taunton Firth, Wiltshire Home Guard.
- Lieutenant-Colonel Cecil Walter Fort, MC, Army Cadet Force.
- Lieutenant (Quartermaster) Edward Cecil Fox (159050), Royal Armoured Corps.
- Major Thomas Frederick Furnell, MC, (123935), General List.
- Captain Frederick Leslie Gardner, Gloucestershire Home Guard.
- Captain (Quartermaster) Thomas William Garnett (116773), Grenadier Guards.
- Captain (temporary Major) Victor Angus Geard, Australian Military Forces.
- Captain (temporary Major) Edward Harry George (32084), Royal Artillery.
- Lieutenant-Colonel George Reginald Gibbs, Army Cadet Force.
- Major (temporary Lieutenant-Colonel) (Commissary) Sidney Sampson Gibbs, Corps of Indian Engineers, Indian Army.
- Captain (temporary Major) Archibald William Henry Grant (153), Grenadier Guards.
- Lieutenant (temporary Captain) Edwin Greenough, Indian Army.
- No. 7596101 Warrant Officer Class II Armament Quartermaster Sergeant Edward Greenslade, Royal Electrical and Mechanical Engineers.
- No. 1053787 Warrant Officer Class II Battery Sergeant Major Thomas William Griffiths, Royal Artillery2428.
- Captain Horace Purchase Haggett, Monmouthshire Home Guard.
- Lieutenant Edward Mills Hall, DCM, Lancashire Home Guard.
- Major (Quartermaster) Frank John Hammond (58390), Royal Army Medical Corps.
- Lieutenant Sydney Hanford, Hampshire Home Guard.
- No. 6734082 Warrant Officer Class II Company Sergeant Major Ronald Harris, Royal Engineers.
- Lieutenant (temporary Captain) Louis Arthur Harrison (118967), Royal Army Ordnance Corps.
- Captain (temporary Major, acting Lieutenant-Colonel) Robert David Quixano Henriques (38714), Royal Artillery.
- Major (temporary Lieutenant-Colonel) James Higginson (34625), Royal Tank Regiment, Royal Armoured Corps.
- Warrant Officer Class II (temporary Warrant Officer Class I) David Hill, Australian Military Forces.
- Lieutenant (Ordnance Executive Officer 3rd Class) (temporary Captain, Ordnance Executive Officer 2nd Class) James Robert Hill (118950), Royal Army Ordnance Corps.
- Captain (temporary Major) John Robert Hobbs (102265), Royal Electrical and Mechanical Engineers.
- Captain George Norman Hodson, Nottinghamshire Home Guard.
- Captain William Holden, London Home Guard.
- No. 4965322 Company Sergeant Major William Edward Holmes, The Sherwood Foresters (Nottinghamshire and Derbyshire Regiment).
- Lieutenant William Andrew Wheeler-Holohan (154308), Royal Engineers.
- Lieutenant (Assistant Commissary) Alfred George Howell, Indian Army Corps of Clerks.
- Major (temporary Lieutenant-Colonel) Arthur Cunynghame Hughes, Indian Army Ordnance Corps.
- Captain (temporary Major) Ian Murray Hunter, Australian Military Forces.
- Lieutenant (Assistant Commissary) Cyril Edward Hutchings, Indian Army Corps of Clerks.
- Captain (Quartermaster) Edwin Illingworth (88375), Royal Artillery.
- Captain (Quartermaster) Gerald Irvin (76233), The Duke of Cornwall's Light Infantry.
- Major (temporary Lieutenant-Colonel) Noel James, Indian Army Ordnance Corps.
- No. 7007892 Warrant Officer Class II Orderly Room Quartermaster Sergeant Leonard James Jeffcott, MM, The Royal Ulster Rifles.
- Captain George Wells Jennings, Essex Home Guard.
- No. 7042433 Warrant Officer Class I, Edward Charles Jerram, MM, The Royal Inniskilling Fusiliers.
- No. 6281947 Warrant Officer Class I, Regimental Sergeant Major George William Johnson, The Middlesex Regiment (Duke of Cambridge's Own).
- Captain (temporary Major) William Johnston (63389), Royal Corps of Signals.
- Captain Ronald Edscer Johnson (135652), Royal Army Medical Corps.
- Major Robert Charles Johnson, MM, 9th Jat Regiment, Indian Army.
- Chaplain to the Forces 4th Class, The Reverend Dewi Llewellyn Jones, BA, (90491), Royal Army Chaplains Department.
- No. 7632615 Sub-Conductor (Acting Conductor) Herbert Kaye, Indian Army Ordnance Corps.
- Major Robert Blythman Kerr, Trinidad Artillery Volunteers.
- Captain (Quartermaster) Daniel Kinchin (131232), Royal Artillery.
- Captain Herbert Kirman, Lincolnshire Home Guard.
- Subedar Lakhsmanan, Queen Victoria's Own Madras Sappers and Miners.
- No. 2745610 Warrant Officer Class I, Doey Ferguson Lamond, The Black Watch (Royal Highland Regiment).
- Warrant Officer Class II, Quartermaster Sergeant (Orderly Room Sergeant) John Ledgerwood, Scottish Border Home Guard.
- Lieutenant (Acting Captain) William Anthony Sampson Lloyd (99242), Royal Engineers.
- Captain John Wesley Loper, New Zealand Military Forces.
- Captain (temporary Major) Frank Harrington Lowman (53650), Royal Engineers.
- Major (Staff Paymaster 2nd Class) (temporary Lieutenant-Colonel, Staff Paymaster 1st Class) Leslie Henry Marc Mackenzie (10713), Royal Army Pay Corps.
- Lieutenant (District Officer) Thomas Edgar Maker (205227), Royal Artillery.
- Major Walter William Matthews, Australian Military Forces.
- Captain (Quartermaster) Archibald Mathieson, New Zealand Military Forces.
- Lieutenant (Quartermaster) Harold Mayo (128381), Royal Armoured Corps.
- No. 2716122 Warrant Officer Class I, Regimental Sergeant Major Hugh Francis McKinney, Irish Guards.
- Lieutenant (Mechanist Officer) (temporary Captain) Benjamin Francis Mee (110386), Royal Army Service Corps.
- Captain Robert Millne, MM, (70981), The South Lancashire Regiment (The Prince of Wales's Volunteers).
- Lieutenant Maxwell Alfred Mimmack (154273), Royal Engineers.
- Major Stanley John Mitton (99756), Royal Army Ordnance Corps.
- Captain John Stuart Morgan, Glamorgan Home Guard.
- Lieutenant (temporary Captain) Manakampat Kesavan Unni Nayar, Indian Army.
- No. 7652953 Warrant Officer Class II Staff Quartermaster Sergeant (acting Warrant Officer Class I, Sub-Conductor) Norman Joseph Nealey, Royal Army Ordnance Corps.
- Major John Elliott Nelson (5535), Army Educational Corps.
- Junior Commander (temporary Senior Commander) Mildred Lucy Nicoll (192071), Auxiliary Territorial Service.
- Captain (Quartermaster) Herbert O'Brien (70147), The Manchester Regiment.
- No. 5942722 Warrant Officer Class I Regimental Sergeant Major Charles Palmer, The Bedfordshire and Hertfordshire Regiment.
- Lieutenant Frank Hugh Northcote (158321), Royal Artillery.
- Subaltern (temporary Junior Commander) Mary Millicent Oakey (230671), Auxiliary Territorial Service.
- No. 6336139 Sub-Conductor (acting Conductor) William George Palmer, Indian Army Corps of Clerks.
- Captain (temporary Major) Harold Parrott, Indian Army Ordnance Corps.
- Captain Alfred Henry Parry (73867), Royal Engineers.
- No. 1409512 Warrant Officer Class I Artificer Sergeant Major Harold Joseph Partridge, Royal Artillery.
- Lieutenant (Quartermaster) Reginald Victor Pearce (188899), Royal Corps of Signals.
- Captain (Quartermaster) Oswald Harcourt Pearson (56511), The Durham Light Infantry.
- Lieutenant (Quartermaster) (temporary Captain) Joseph Pennycook (188299), Royal Armoured Corps.
- Lieutenant Alexander Peters (186194), The Black Watch (Royal Highland Regiment).
- Warrant Officer Class II Company Sergeant Major William Peters, Kent Home Guard.
- Junior Commander (temporary Senior Commander) Doreathea Flavia Phillips (192938), Auxiliary Territorial Service.
- Captain James Stuart Pitts, Hampshire Home Guard.
- Captain James Plant, Staffordshire Home Guard.
- Captain Francis James Plummer (97846), Royal Engineers.
- Warrant Officer Class II Company Sergeant Major William Potter, Westmorland Home Guard.
- Major (Quartermaster) Herbert Mark Prince (56852), Royal Army Medical Corps.
- Lieutenant (temporary Captain) Ant Ram, Indian Army.
- Warrant Officer Class II Company Sergeant Major Arthur Llewellyn Rees, DCM, Glamorgan Home Guard.
- Captain (temporary Major) Jack Constable Price Rowe (56655), The Devonshire Regiment.
- Captain Sydney Scott (59366), The Royal Fusiliers (City of London Regiment).
- Captain (Quartermaster) (temporary Major) Richard Francis Sholl (75969), Royal Artillery.
- Major Nathu Singh, Sardar Bahadur, OBI, Indian States Forces.
- Major Thakur Zabar Singh, Indian Army.
- Lieutenant (Quartermaster) Frank Henry Victor Skinner (131896), Royal Artillery.
- Captain (Quartermaster) Charles Thomas Sparrow (125107), The West Yorkshire Regiment (The Prince of Wales's Own).
- No. 2557189 Warrant Officer Class I Regimental Sergeant Major Edgar Richard Smith, Royal Corps of Signals.
- Lieutenant (Assistant Commissary) Charles Frederick Stanton, Indian Army Corps of Clerks.
- Captain Joseph Steedman, North Riding Home Guard.
- Captain (acting Major) William John Wathen Stick (111335), Royal Engineers.
- Captain (temporary Major) Charles Peter Stocker (168707), Royal Army Ordnance Corps.
- Lieutenant (temporary Captain) (Deputy Commissary) Thomas Ellison Stoneham, Royal Indian Army Service Corps.
- Captain (temporary Major) George Langford Sullivan (53964), 14th/20th King's Hussars, attached Trans-Jordan Frontier Force.
- Lieutenant (temporary Captain) Krishna Swarup, Indian Army.
- Lieutenant (temporary Captain) Theodore George Swithinbank (59981), The Duke of Wellington's Regiment (West Riding).
- Captain Sidney Thacker, Hertfordshire Home Guard.
- Captain (temporary Major) Peter Cleasby-Thompson (15067), Lancashire Fusiliers, attached Army Air Corps.
- Captain Reginald Leonard Thornton, London Home Guard.
- Major John James Tindale, North Riding Home Guard Lieutenant (temporary Captain) William Albert Toogood (181672), Royal Army Service Corps.
- Captain George Leonard Tucker, Warwickshire Home Guard.
- Captain (Quartermaster) Sydney Tyrrell, MM, (57852), Royal Artillery.
- Captain (temporary Major) Harold Edward Van Der Noot (43671), Irish Guards.
- Major Lionel John Vicarage, Indian Army.
- Lieutenant (temporary Captain) Alwyn Brunow Waters (152179), Royal Engineers.
- Captain (temporary Major) (Quartermaster) Philip Arthur Percival Webberley (99201), Royal Army Medical Corps.
- No. 3381199 Sub-Conductor (acting Conductor) Walter Welfare, Indian Army Corps of Clerks.
- Captain (temporary Major) Maurice Frank Gerard Wentworth (70984), General List (Gold Coast Regiment).
- Major (temporary Lieutenant-Colonel) Arthur White (31854), Royal Engineers.
- Captain George Henry Willcox (75191), Irish Guards.
- Major (Quartermaster) Arthur Ernest Winton (33418), Royal Corps of Signals.
- Commandant Emily Mary Margarete Lindley-Wood (661084), Voluntary Aid Detachment.
- Lieutenant John Ivan Yaxley, Merioneth Home Guard.

Honorary Member

- Kaid Haim Appelbaum, Trans-Jordan Frontier Force.

Royal Air Force

- Acting Squadron Leader Charles Herrington (45254).
- Acting Squadron Leader Edward Lister (77571), Royal Air Force Volunteer Reserve.
- Flight Lieutenant James Boyer (46434).
- Flight Lieutenant Christopher Benjamin Richard John Been Curtis (78389), Royal Air Force Volunteer Reserve.
- Flight Lieutenant (now Acting Squadron Leader) Reginald Darker (44894).
- Flight Lieutenant John Duncan (03227), Royal Air Force Volunteer Reserve.
- Flight Lieutenant William Robert Dunlop (44947).
- Flight Lieutenant (now Acting Squadron Leader) Michael Golovine (79462), Royal Air Force Volunteer Reserve.
- Flight Lieutenant George Desmond Graham (61855), Royal Air Force Volunteer Reserve.
- Flight Lieutenant (now Acting Squadron Leader) Michael Lister Haigh (77034), Royal Air Force Volunteer Reserve.
- Flight Lieutenant (now Acting Squadron Leader) William Hore (45035).
- Flight Lieutenant Arthur Kenneth Kibbler (62927), Royal Air Force Volunteer Reserve.
- Flight Lieutenant Norman Livingstone (83680), Royal Air Force Volunteer Reserve.
- Flight Lieutenant George Valentine Meredith (45905).
- Flight Lieutenant James Keay Milne (81498), Royal Air Force Volunteer Reserve.
- Flight Lieutenant (now Acting Squadron Leader) Anthony Richard Pearce (35239).
- Flight Lieutenant Ernest Henry Merton Samson (77306), Royal Air Force Volunteer Reserve.
- Flight Lieutenant Charles Harry Wallington (45554).
- Flight Lieutenant John Albert Williams (43993)
- Acting Flight Lieutenant William Alfred Ballett (45141).
- Acting Flight Lieutenant Alan Wilfred Bennett (86061), Royal Air Force Volunteer Reserve.
- Acting Flight Lieutenant Francis Leslie Birch (68231), Royal Air Force Volunteer Reserve.
- Acting Flight Lieutenant Francis Bottoms (45671).
- Acting Flight Lieutenant Stanley Frank Browne (35396).
- Acting Flight Lieutenant Norman Edgar Browning (86238), Royal Air Force Volunteer Reserve.
- Acting Flight Lieutenant Cecil William Buckingham (47928).
- Acting Flight Lieutenant Frederick Norman Smith Creek, MC, (61810), Royal Air Force Volunteer Reserve.
- Acting Flight Lieutenant Claude Alfred Freestone (61659), Royal Air Force Volunteer Reserve.
- Acting Flight Lieutenant Frederick John Gibney (118086), Royal Air Force Volunteer Reserve.
- Acting Flight Lieutenant Harry Rudolph Hambleton (119972), Royal Air Force Volunteer Reserve.
- Acting Flight Lieutenant David Norman Harris (64392), Royal Air Force Volunteer Reserve.
- Acting Flight Lieutenant Addison Geoffrey Lankester (85122), Royal Air Force Volunteer Reserve.
- Acting Flight Lieutenant Stephen Ranson Walton (49580).
- Acting Flight Lieutenant Basil Edward Wheadon (108264), Royal Air Force Volunteer Reserve.
- Acting Flight Lieutenant John Kenneth Young (88799), Royal Air Force Volunteer Reserve.
- Flying Officer Frank Harold Breach (50740).
- Flying Officer Jack Miles (48069).
- Flying Officer Eric John Harrison Stanton (107192), Royal Air Force Volunteer Reserve.
- Pilot Officer Frederick John Ritson Dodd (123746), Royal Air Force Volunteer Reserve.
- Pilot Officer Leslie Ralph Flower, MM, (48213).
- Pilot Officer Rupert William Lamb (49229).
- Pilot Officer Arthur Frederick Murley (133825), Royal Air Force Volunteer Reserve.
- Pilot Officer James Satchell Watson Stewart (120364), Royal Air Force Volunteer Reserve.
- Warrant Officer Harry Percy Abbott (204528).
- Warrant Officer James William Beale (562976).
- Warrant Officer Walter Elliott Draycott (566248).
- Warrant Officer Charles Frederick Field (564191).
- Warrant Officer Percy Fletcher (338180).
- Warrant Officer Duncan Colin Kennedy (508979).
- Warrant Officer William Joseph Leggett (345643).
- Warrant Officer William James Alderman Mayes (349528).
- Warrant Officer Stanley Morehen (513784).
- Warrant Officer William Patrick Navin (510674).
- Warrant Officer Harry Nickson (353008).
- Warrant Officer Alfred Llewellyn Pritchard (350644).
- Warrant Officer Hubert Maurice Smith (352951).
- Warrant Officer George Fredenck Staples (331623).
- Warrant Officer Griffith Tudor Williams (148172).
- Acting Warrant Officer Edward Rupert Luscombe (363142).
- Acting Squadron Leader James Gerald Burns (Aus.2947), Royal Australian Air Force.
- Flight Lieutenant Francis Gill (Aus.1799), Royal Australian Air Force.
- Flight Lieutenant Henry Reginald Percy Relf (Aus.2937), Royal Australian Air Force.
- Acting Flight Lieutenant David Hamlin Gwinn (Can/C.3914), Royal Canadian Air Force.
- Flying Officer John James McDowell, Royal New Zealand Air Force.
- Lieutenant Benjamin Vorster (P.746), South African Air Force.
- Flying Officer Harjinder Singh Baines, Indian Air Force.
- Flying Officer David Gordon Bhore, Indian Air Force.
- Flight Officer Margaret Cleator (3953), Women's Auxiliary Air Force.
- Flight Officer Catherine Elizabeth Clough, (1314), Women's Auxiliary Air Force.

Civil Division

- Hetty Forbes Adam, Women's Land Army County Secretary, West Sussex.
- Robert Adam, General Secretary of the Young Men’s Christian Association, Edinburgh.
- Alice Agar, JP, County Officer (Hampshire & Isle of Wight), St. John Ambulance Association. For services to Civil Defence.
- Doris Ethel Agnew, Inspector, Insurance Department, Ministry of Health.
- Thomas Allen, Youth Organiser, Northern Ireland Council of Social Service.
- Edward Simpson Anderson, Production Manager, Northern Aluminium Co. Ltd.
- Albert Frank Archer (Major, Home Guard), Civil Assistant and Accountant, Ministry of Aircraft Production.
- Cecil Edward Asher, Senior Staff Officer, Ministry of Fuel and Power.
- Frederick William Bagnall, Director and Works Manager, Walter Somers Ltd.
- Frederick William Baldock, Senior Contract Officer, Admiralty.
- Albert Frederick Baldwin, Higher Clerical Officer, HM Stationery Office.
- Martin George Ball, Assistant Works Manager, Torpedo Tube Section, Peter Brotherhood Ltd.
- Charles Ballin, General Manager, Liverpool Branch, United Molasses Co. Ltd.
- William Theodore Barker, Senior Technical Officer, Ministry of Labour and National Service.
- James Isaac Barrance, Staff Officer, Office of the Minister of State, Cairo.
- Alderman Evelyn Mary Miller-Barstow, JP, Chairman of the Weston-super-Mare Juvenile Advisory Committee.
- Stanley John Batchelder, Secretary of the Leeds Chamber of Commerce.
- Edwyn Ernest Hope Bate, Superintending Progress Engineer, Ministry of Works.
- Robert Edgar Bates, Works Director, Luxfer Ltd.
- Robert Glover Baxter, Borough Engineer, County Borough of Southend-on-Sea. For services to Civil Defence.
- John Bayley, Stamp Shop Superintendent, High Duty Alloys Ltd.
- Elsie Dorothea Baynham, Local Welfare Officer, Western Command.
- William George Bedford, Superintendent, Austin Motor Co. Ltd.
- John Edward Benham, Director, Benham & Sons Ltd.
- Harold Alderson Bennett, Secretary of the Emergency Committee of Road Passenger Transport Undertakings, Manchester.
- Squadron Leader Neill Gibson Bennett, RAFVR, Senior Inspector of Accidents, Air Ministry.
- William Henry Bennett, Chief Steward, Merchant Navy.
- Frederick Styles Billowes, Confidential Secretary, J. Samuel White & Co. Ltd.
- Frank Blair, Chief Assistant to the National Registration Officer, Leeds.
- Harry Frederick Blenkarn, Chief Steward, Merchant Navy.
- Reginald Percy Charles Block, Sub-District Manager, Ministry of War Transport.
- John Boneham, Managing Director, Boneham & Turner Ltd.
- Lily Mary Booker, Superintendent Health Visitor and Inspector of Midwives, Devon County Council.
- Bessie Philip Boyes, Regional Welfare Officer, Ministry of Labour and National Service.
- Robert Braid, Chairman and Managing Director, Braid Bros.
- Sidney Bramhall, Works Director, Smith's Stamping Works Ltd.
- Captain Frank Thomas Bright, DFC, Observer Commander, Royal Observer Corps.
- Arthur Brooks, District House Coal Officer, Hull.
- Horace Skeet Broom, AMIMechE, Design and Production Manager, Broom & Wade Ltd.
- James Brown, Works Manager, David Rowan & Co. Ltd.
- Wilfred Banks Duncan Brown, Managing Director, Glacier Metal Co. Ltd.
- John Alexander Buchan, Chief Regional Officer, Ministry of Pensions.
- John Buchanan, Yard Manager, Greenock Dockyard Co. Ltd.
- Captain William Walter Buck, Master, Merchant Navy.
- Arthur John Bulled, Headmaster, Senior Boys School, Branksome Park, Exmouth.
- William Alfred Burgess, Principal Foreman of Stores, RN Armament Depot.
- Stephen France Burman, Divisional Officer, Midland Region, National Fire Service.
- Keith Gordon Butt, Works Manager, Ranalah Yacht Yard Ltd.
- Norman Alistair Sinclair Campbell, Manager, Ross-shire Electric Supply Co. Ltd. For services to the War Savings Campaign.
- Hugh Sidney Cann, Chief Assistant to the Director of Education, Swansea. For services to Civil Defence.
- Henry Care, Chief Officer, Merchant Navy.
- Helen Catto, Chief Welfare Superintendent (Women), London, Midland and Scottish Railway Company.
- Edith Margaret Chambers, Interim Secretary, Scottish Association of Young Farmers' Clubs.
- Richard Chandler, Chief Officer, Merchant Navy.
- Frederick Rupert Cherrill, Superintendent, Criminal Investigation Department, Metropolitan Police.
- Frederick Augustus Clubley, Chief Engineer Officer, Merchant Navy.
- Reginald Henry Cheesmond Coates, Assistant County Director, Northumberland, British Red Cross Society.
- Robert Cogger, Outdoor Assistant, Signals and Telegraphs, London, Southern Railway Company. For services to Civil Defence.
- Kathleen Collinson, Honorary Campaign Secretary, Retford National Savings Committee.
- Councillor Alfred John Corbett. For public services in Brecon.
- Helen Corry, Senior Clerk, Ministry of Public Security, Northern Ireland.
- Harry Cottam, Chief Engineer Officer, Merchant Navy.
- James Croal Craig, Station Master, Edinburgh (Waverley), London and North Eastern Railway Company.
- George Norrie Craighead, Honorary Secretary, Royal National Lifeboat Institution, Peterhead (now serving in the Royal Air Force).
- Roberta Hunter Hamilton Crichton, Chief Restaurant and Welfare Superintendent, Navy, Army and Air Force Institutes.
- Irvine Le Mesurier Croll, Manager of the Southampton Employment Exchange, Ministry of Labour and National Service.
- Elaine Cicely Cuthbert, Honorary Secretary, Southampton Division, Soldiers', Sailors' and Airmen's Families Association.
- Herbert James Darwood, Superintendent, Daimler Co. Ltd (Aero-Engines).
- Charles Davidson, Skipper of a Steam Trawler.
- Joseph George Davies, Works Manager, Grayson, Rollo & Clover Docks Ltd.
- Archibald Arthur Davis, Deputy Divisional Food Officer, Southern Division, Ministry of Food.
- Alfred John Dawson, MIEE, Chief Electrical Engineer, Albright & Wilson Ltd.
- Phyllis Ophelia Dent. For services to religious education.
- Edith Dickie, Superintendent of Typists, Scottish Education Department.
- David Dickson, Chief Staff Officer, Ministry of War Transport.
- Lilian Anne Hilda Docker, Higher Clerical Officer, Ministry of Production.
- William Shepherd Donnelly, Works Manager, Alex Findlay & Co. Ltd.
- Richard William Dunn, Chief Clerk, Territorial Army and Air Force Association of the County of the City of Glasgow.
- Robert Dunn, Chief Engineer Officer, Merchant Navy.
- Jane Beatrice Madeline Dunsterville, Clerical Assistant, General Staff, War Office.
- Moses Harry Duxbury, Divisional Officer, No. 29 Area, National Fire Service.
- Margaret Emma, Baroness Ebbisham. For services to the East End Maternity and other Hospitals.
- Roy Edmonds, Works Manager, Vickers-Armstrongs Ltd.
- Charles Edwards, Deputy Assistant Director of Contracts, Ministry of Supply.
- Harry James Edwards, President, General Executive of the Transport and General Workers Union.
- Alderman Huw Thomas Edwards, JP, Area Secretary for North Wales, Shropshire and Cheshire, Transport and General Workers Union.
- Dorothy Mary Elliot, Women's Land Army County Secretary, Leicester and Rutland.
- Garrett Hughes Elliott, Command Supervisor, Navy, Army and Air Force Institutes, Southern Command.
- Winifred May Ellis, Private Secretary to the Secretary for Services Welfare, Methodist and United Board Churches.
- John Henry Evans, Manager, Mountstuart Drydocks Ltd.
- George Rene Frank Eveleigh, Staff Officer, Ministry of Health.
- Alexander Gloag Fisken, Saw Mill and Works Manager, Park Dobson & Co.
- David Flett, Skipper of a Steam Trawler.
- Thomas Harold Flowers, Executive Engineer, General Post Office.
- Sydney Foord, Deputy to the District Controller and Civil Defence Staff Officer, Scarborough.
- Margaret Mary Forman, County Organiser, Nottinghamshire, Women's Voluntary Services for Civil Defence.
- Captain Reginald Charles Foster, MC, FRIBA, Honorary Secretary, Wanstead and Woodford Savings Committee.
- Hugh Cyril Stanislaus Fothergill, Midland Regional Manager, Petroleum Board.
- John George Freeman, Chief Officer, Merchant Navy.
- Edward Ivor Freemantle, MC, Technical Officer, Ministry of Aircraft Production.
- James Francis French, Senior Clerk, Inspectorate of Naval Ordnance, Sheffield.
- Cecil William Fulker, Acting Secretary, Parliamentary Committee of the Co-operative Congress.
- Robert Garth, Superintendent, Lancashire Constabulary. For services to Civil Defence.
- Hugh Gilmour, Chief Examiner, Acton Regional Office, War Damage Commission.
- Huntley Strathearn Gordon, Welfare Officer, London Passenger Transport Board. For services to Civil Defence.
- Bailie William McDougall Gordon, Chairman, Aberdeen County Air Raid Precautions Committee.
- Edwin Graham, General Manager, Sir W. G. Armstrong Whitworth & Co. (Shipbuilders) Ltd.
- Sidney Newlands Graham, Head of the Drawing Office, Fairmile Marine Co. Ltd.
- Captain Edward Donald Gray, Master, Merchant Navy.
- Christopher Joseph Gregory, Station Master, Liverpool Street, London and North Eastern Railway Company.
- Harold Wallace Grigsby, Assistant Director, General Production Division, Ministry of Information.
- Major Joseph Grounds, TD, Drainage Engineer, Ministry of Agriculture and Fisheries.
- Daisy Julia Gunton, lately Headmistress of Beech Hill Senior Girls School, Luton.
- William Frederick George Hall, Higher Clerical Officer, War Office.
- Francis Christopher Stanley Hallewell, lately Secretary of the Birmingham Branch of the Bank Officers' Guild (now serving in the Royal Navy).
- Major Charles Henry Hannington, JP, Commandant, Portsmouth Special Constabulary.
- Henry William Harper, Works Manager, A. V. Roe & Co. Ltd.
- Thomas Milner Harper, Second Engineer Officer, Merchant Navy.
- Frederick Samuel Harris, Managing Director, P. K. Harris & Sons Ltd.
- Joseph Harrison, Station Master, Euston, London, Midland and Scottish Railway Company.
- James Raymond Harrison, Barrackmaster, Ulster Special Constabulary.
- David Caldwell Harvie, Assistant District Officer, Manchester Assistance Board.
- James Hay. For public services in Aberdeen.
- Charles Daniel Hearn, Chief Clerk, London South Collection, Board of Customs and Excise.
- Major Francis Paget Hett, DL, Local Welfare Officer, South Eastern Command.
- Frederick Arthur Hibbert, Plant and Design Engineer, Imperial Chemical Industries (Plastics) Ltd.
- George Kenneth Highley, Purser, Merchant Navy.
- Rowland Hill, Fire Guard Staff Officer, Peterborough.
- Captain Bernard Douglas Hobby, Master, Merchant Navy.
- Thomas Holloway, Purser, Merchant Navy.
- Henry William Hollyer, MM, Shipping Assistant, Ministry of War Transport.
- Captain John Henry Holman, DSC, Master, Merchant Navy.
- Captain Kenneth James Holman, Chairman, Camborne Air Training Corps Committee.
- Captain Edward John Holmes, Air Raid Precautions Officer and Training Officer, Royal Borough of Kensington.
- Russell Nelson Holmes, Radio Officer, Royal Air Force, Ferry Command.
- Catherine Eliza Eugenie Hopkin, Women's Land Army County Secretary, Monmouthshire.
- Annie Hopkins, Assistant Collector of Taxes, Board of Inland Revenue.
- Frederick William Hopper, Yard Manager, Wm. Pickersgill & Sons Ltd.
- Herbert Oliver Home, JP, Actuary, Aberdeen Savings Bank.
- Charles Houghton, Superintendent, Liverpool Salvage Corps. For services to Civil Defence.
- John Hunter, Secretary, Lossiemouth Higher Grade Public School Savings Association.
- Arthur James Thomas Ireland, AFRAeS, Technical Assistant, Ministry of Aircraft Production.
- Captain Boscawan Lloyd Isaac, Master, Merchant Navy.
- Walter Henry Jarratt, MINA, Naval Architect, Amos & Smith Ltd.
- William Jebb, Deputy Principal, Ministry of Agriculture, Northern Ireland.
- William Gray Johns, Civil Assistant, Naval Intelligence Division, Admiralty.
- Alexander Johnston, Skipper of a Steam Drifter.
- Edward William James Jones, Vice-Chairman, Maiden and Coombe Savings Committee.
- Harry Jones, Staff Officer, Foreign Office.
- Percival Frank Jupe, Chief Clerk, HM Treasury.
- John Kennedy, JP. For public services in the County of Durham.
- Elsa Rose Khoroche, Honorary Organiser for Street Groups, Cheltenham Savings Committee.
- Reginald Killey, Technical Adviser, Fire Service Department, Home Office.
- William Edward Lambourn, Director and Buyer, Pressed Steel Co. Ltd.
- Thomas Leslie Lane, Alarm Controller, South Eastern Region, Ministry of Home Security.
- George Laws, Chief Sanitary Inspector and Housing Officer, Richmond, Surrey.
- Edith Noel Layton, Group Administrator, London Region, lately Centre Organiser, City of London, Women's Voluntary Services for Civil Defence.
- Reginald Edward Leeds, Manager, Wire Drawing Dye Department, General Electric Co. Ltd.
- Arnold Sydney Leng, Joint Managing Director, Christopher Leng & Sons Ltd.
- Harold Lingard, MIEE, Principal Lighting and Power Officer, Passive Air Defence Department, Ministry of Supply.
- Elizabeth Duff Linn, Controller of Typing, Ministry of Supply.
- Joseph Lloyd, Works Manager, J. Mandleberg & Co. Ltd.
- Robert Lowry, Establishment Officer, Central Ordnance Depot, War Office.
- Susan Lushington. For services to music in Hampshire.
- Tom Lyon, Railway Superintendent, Liverpool Dock Estate, Mersey Docks and Harbour Board.
- Charles Wilson MacDowall, Managing Director, MacDowall Equipment Company.
- Janet McGilp, Headmistress of Lochburn Home, Glasgow.
- James Charles Fairlie Mclntyre, Executive Officer, Agricultural Executive Committee for East Fife.
- Captain Donald Macbeath Mackay, Master, Merchant Navy.
- Captain Alexander McLachlan, Master, Merchant Navy.
- Captain William McLeod, Master, Merchant Navy.
- Albert Percival Mallaby, Senior Second Engineer Officer, Merchant Navy.
- Edith Louise Manley, Women's Land Army County Secretary, Cheshire.
- Edward Grey Marchant, Senior Staff Officer, Air Ministry.
- Percy Walter John Martin, Personal Assistant to the General Manager, Port of London Authority.
- Leonard Mellor, Divisional Commander, Special Constabulary, Durham County Police Force.
- Florence Milnes, Librarian, British Broadcasting Corporation.
- Arthur Robert Mitchell, MC, (Captain, Home Guard), Chief of the Ship Drawing Office, Yarrow & Co. Ltd.
- Leonard Thomas Moorby, Senior Staff Officer, Board of Trade.
- Maurice Desmond Morrissey, Station Manager, British Overseas Airways Corporation.
- Captain Samuel Bond Mosley, Master, Merchant Navy.
- Alexander James Muir, Technical Assistant II, Ministry of Aircraft Production.
- Councillor Miss Eunice Guthrie Murray, JP. For public services in Dunbartonshire.
- Captain John Murray, Master, Merchant Navy.
- Captain Harold Bishop Mylchreest, Partner in Pedder & Mylchreest Ltd, Delivery Contractors.
- Francis Neal, Assistant to the Coal Supplies Officer for the Midland (Amalgamated) District.
- John Nicol, deceased, Chief Engineer Officer, Merchant Navy (dated 18 March 1943) (Subsequently, lost at sea as a result of enemy action).
- Harry Nodder, Assistant to the Divisional Engineer, Great Western Railway Company, Plymouth. For services to Civil Defence.
- Hubert Oliver, First Radio Officer Merchant Navy.
- John Bernard Olley, Works Manager, ASEA Electric Company.
- Alexander Park, Chief Engineer Officer, Merchant Navy.
- John Cecil Parker, Manager, Net Department, Rylands Bros. Ltd.
- Victor Parry, Air Raid Precautions Officer, Chief Warden and Fire Guard Officer, Walsall.
- David Paterson, Sub-District Manager, Edinburgh, Emergency Road Transport Organisation, Ministry of War Transport.
- Henry John Pearson, First Refrigerating Engineer Officer, Merchant Navy.
- Reginald Philip Perry, Manager of Brass Plant, John Lysaght Ltd.
- Payne Harry Pettiford, Deputy Superintendent of the Operative Department, Royal Mint.
- Maurice Frank Pinnock, Staff Officer, Offices of the War Cabinet.
- Henry Alfred Plastow, MM, Senior Staff Officer, British Air Commission, Washington.
- John James Plimmer, Manager, Ministry of Supply Agency Factory.
- Helen Frances Plumbly, Supervising Clerk, Grade I, Ministry of Economic Warfare.
- William Pook, Chief Engineer Officer, Merchant Navy.
- Herbert Lloyd Poulson, Chief Officer, Merchant Navy.
- Daniel Powell, Senior Sanitary Inspector, Bedwellty Urban District Council.
- Harry Powell, Headmaster, Meir Senior Mixed Council School, Stoke-on-Trent.
- Albert Henry Poynton, Superintendent of Stores, G. W. Lewis Tileries Ltd.
- Lady Olein Eva Constance Wyndham-Quin, Head of the Army Records Department, Wounded and Missing Department, Joint War Organisation of the British Red Cross Society and Order of St. John.
- Charles Percival Raffill, Assistant Curator, Royal Botanic Gardens, Kew.
- William Raitt, Honorary Secretary, Morpeth Savings Committee.
- Jessie Millar Ralston, lately Superintendent of Typists, Colonial Office.
- William Leonard Rawson, Superintendent, B.S.A. Guns Ltd.
- Amelia Jane Rees, Higher Clerical Officer, Office of the Public Trustee.
- James Henry Reeves, Clerical Officer, Department of the Director of Public Prosecutions.
- Alexander Duncan Reid, Chief Production Engineer, Scottish Motor Traction Co. Ltd.
- George Gapon Rich, Chief Officer, Merchant Navy.
- Thomas Edward Richardson, Flying Instructor, No. 4 Elementary Flying Training School, RAF Flying Training Command.
- Alfred Riggall, Honorary Treasurer and Accountant of the North Midland Divisional Union of the Young Men's Christian Association.
- Douglas Craig Robinson, Assistant Works Superintendent, Handley Page Ltd.
- Adam Robson, Probation Officer, Newcastle-on-Tyne.
- Wilhelmine Wallace Robson, Headmistress, Sunderland Road Girls School, Gateshead.
- Captain John Lamb Rogerson, Master, Merchant Navy.
- Donalda Macleod Ross, Chairman, Women's Land Army Sub-Committee of the Agricultural Executive Committee for Ross and Cromarty (Main-land).
- Frederick Alexander Ross, AMIEE, Chief Electrical Engineer, Swan, Hunter, & Wigham Richardson Ltd.
- William Martin Rowland, Joint Managing Director, Universal Grinding Wheel Co. Ltd.
- Alan Ruddle, Secretary-Superintendent, Royal Gwent Hospital, Newport, Monmouthshire. For services to Civil Defence.
- Geoffrey Terence Ryan, Superintendent of Docks, Avonmouth and Portishead.
- Cyril Hugh Sanders, Superintendent (Telegraphs), Head Post Office, Swansea.
- Captain Harold Ernest Sanderson, Regional Officer, Grade II, Scotland Region, Ministry of Home Security.
- Eleanor Saunders, Chief Clerk, Telephone Manager's Office, South East Area, General Post Office.
- Major John Walter Saunders, Employed in a Department of the Foreign Office.
- William James Sayer, Superintendent acting as Head Postmaster, Head Post Office, Eastbourne.
- Shirley Martin Searle, Staff Officer, War Office.
- Captain Edward Shaw, Master, Merchant Navy.
- Alfred John Shrieves, Higher Clerical Officer, Postal and Telegraph Censorship Department.
- Captain George Simison, Master, Merchant Navy.
- Captain David Sinclair, Master, Merchant Navy.
- Harry Singleton, Works Director, The Tempered Spring Co. Ltd.
- John Campbell Sloan, Electrical Manager, Barclay Curie & Co. Ltd.
- Ernest Small, Joint Managing Director, M. B. Wild & Co. Ltd.
- Ralph Wyman Smart, Staff Officer, General Post Office.
- Major Alexander Smith, MC, Superintendent, City of Glasgow Special Constabulary. For services to Civil Defence.
- Hilda Edwards Smith, Controller of Typists, Ministry of Aircraft Production.
- Mabel Smith, Matron, Royal South Hants and Southampton Hospital. For services to Civil Defence.
- Captain Thomas William Smith, Master, Merchant Navy.
- William Henry Smith, Member of the National Savings Committee, and of the Birmingham Local Savings Committee.
- Joseph Smyth, lately General Secretary and Treasurer of the Ulster Teachers' Union.
- Brian Furmstone Rice Stack, Superintendent, Stores Branch, Board of Customs and Excise.
- Gerald Stanning, Works Manager, Allen West & Co. Ltd.
- George Staveley, Boiler Works Manager, Cammell Laird & Co. Ltd.
- Robert Stein, Chief Trial Trip Engineer, G. & J. Weir Ltd.
- Annie Ramsay Stevenson, Organising Secretary, Glasgow Centre, Women's Voluntary Services for Civil Defence.
- Penuel Grant (Daisy) Stewart, Secretary, East Scottish Branch and Divisional Secretary, Edinburgh, Soldiers', Sailors' and Airmen's Families Association.
- Wing Commander Douglas Stewart, MC, AFC, (Royal Air Force, Retd.), Observer Commander, Royal Observer Corps.
- Katharine Bedingfeld Shaw Stewart, Honorary Secretary of the Inverness County Nursing Association.
- Nesta Jessie Stoneham, Supervisor of Women's Studies, National Fire Service College.
- Frank Cyril Alexander Street, Engineer Works Manager, Vosper Ltd.
- Robert Stuart, Chief Inspector, Bristol Aeroplane Company.
- Major Martin Stutfield (Retd.), Assistant to the Controller of Factory Transportation, Ministry of Supply.
- Frank Swift, Manager of Foundry, Darlington Forge Ltd.
- Captain Hugh Tait, Master, Merchant Navy.
- Irene Compton Tappenden, Domiciliary Midwife, London County Council. For services to Civil Defence.
- Sidney Taylor, Chairman and Managing Director, General Engineering Co. Ltd.
- Captain Thomas Thirlaway Telford, Master, Merchant Navy.
- Noel Goddard Terry, Controller, Royal Observer Corps.
- Percy William Earl Thatcher, Secretary, Port Emergency Committee, Southampton Docks.
- Captain David John Thomas, Master, Merchant Navy.
- John Thorburn, Chief Electrician, Merchant Navy.
- Claude John Thome, Chief Assistant, Paper Control, Ministry of Supply.
- Basil Duncan Tims, Staff Officer, India, Office.
- Dorothy Lee Todd, Superintendent of Typists, London County Council.
- Caroline Marie Tucker, Private Secretary to the Lord Chancellor.
- William Turner, Honorary Secretary, Rawtenstall Savings Committee.
- Leslie Donald Tyrrell, Chief Planning Engineer, Rootes Securities Ltd (Airframe Factory).
- Captain James Alfred Uglow, Master, Merchant Navy.
- Sylvia Vachell, Regional Administrator for Wales, Women's Voluntary Services for Civil Defence.
- Walter Edwin Vickers, Public Assistance Officer, County of Lincolnshire, Parts of Kesteven. For services to Civil Defence.
- Margaret Callander Wade, Commandant, Larbert District, Stirlingshire, British Red Cross Society. For services, to Civil Defence.
- Henry Johnston Wallace, Superintendent and Deputy Chief Constable, Selkirkshire.
- Albert Walmsley, Chairman of the Stretford and District Employment Committee.
- Henry Neville Walton, Secretary of the Newcastle Coasting and Short Sea Shipping Committee, Ministry of War Transport.
- Eirene Mervynia Wanstall, Secretary of the Juvenile Employment Bureau, Newcastle-on-Tyne.
- Percy Wharton Waters, Chief Chemist and Metallurgist, Ford Motor Co. Ltd.
- Donald Harlock Watkins, Constructor, Dockyard Department, Admiralty.
- Victor Grant Watson, Purser, Merchant Navy.
- William Anthony Graham Watson, Divisional Officer, No. 5. Fire Area, National Fire Service.
- William Norman Wheat, Manager, Optical Department, Chance Bros & Co. Ltd.
- Marjorie Joyce Whimster, County Borough Organiser, Bath, Women's Voluntary Services for Civil Defence.
- John Whitehead, Civil Defence District Controller, County Durham Clerk to Billingham Urban District Council.
- Thomas George Willett, Secretary, Soldiers', Sailors', and Airmen's Help Society for Brighton and Hove.
- Captain Hugh James Williams, Master, Merchant Navy.
- Robert Willis, Manager, C. H. Bailey Ltd.
- Stella Mary Willis, Secretary to the Foreign Relations Department, Joint War Organisation of the British Red Cross Society and Order of St. John.
- Ernest Wilson, Assistant to the Chief Accountant, Navy, Army and Air Force Institutes.
- John Frederick Wilson, Manager in charge of Admiralty repairs at Palmers Hebburn Co. Ltd.
- Victor Franklin Wood, Head of Branch, Ministry of Food.
- William Arthur Victor Wood, Technical Assistant (Airframe Component Repair), Civilian Repair Organisation.
- Cyril Wright, Shop Superintendent, Standard Motor Co. Ltd (Aero-Engines).
- William Edgar Wright, HM Assistant Inspector of Schools.
- Arthur Frank Young, Staff Officer, Board of Inland Revenue.
- Noah Mackintosh Youngson, Chief Engineer Officer, Merchant Navy.
- Joseph Sinclair Carolin, a British subject resident in Brazil.
- Marjorie Crawford, Shorthand-typist at His Majesty's Embassy in Buenos Aires.
- John Norman Farrar, formerly British Vice-Consul in Patras.
- Barbara Forwood, a British subject resident in Khartoum.
- Edward Charles Gamble, Clerical Officer at His Majesty's Legation in Tehran.
- Horace Frederick Alfred Gates, Archivist at His Majesty's Legation in Lima.
- Sydney Herbert Montagu Head, His Majesty's Consul in Las Palmas.
- Ethel Humphreys, a British subject resident in Philadelphia.
- Margaret Manisty, Clerical Officer in a Department attached to the Foreign Office.
- Alfred Marshall, formerly Clerical Officer at His Majesty's Embassy in China, now Clerical Officer at His Majesty's Legation in Tehran.
- Elisa Pagram, a British subject resident in Guatemala.
- Margaret Fleming Etherington-Smith, a British subject resident in Lisbon.
- Bernard Francis Twiney, Assistant Chief Accountant, Sudan Railways.
- Gawin Wild, British Vice-Consul in Algiers.
- Rowland Paterson Wilson, MB, ChBEd, FRCS(Ed), Medical Officer in Charge of the Giza Eye Hospital and Laboratory in Cairo.
- Frank Walter Austin, District Secretary of Brigade and Centre Secretary, St. John Ambulance Association, Southern Rhodesia.
- Alfred Bain. For municipal and social welfare services in Southern Rhodesia.
- Gladys Louise Buhler. For services in connection with activities under the auspices of the Royal Empire Society.
- Lionel Hedley Collett, Agricultural and Livestock Officer, Basutoland.
- Richard Allen Cox, employed in the Department of Justice, Southern Rhodesia.
- Francis Blaikie Holmes. For services to Newfoundland troops and to their wives and families in Newfoundland.
- Eileen May Munnings, Lady Divisional Superintendent, St. John Ambulance Association, Southern Rhodesia. For services in connection with the Red Cross and St. John Ambulance Associations in the Colony.
- Gertrude Josephine Jude, Assistant State Controller of the Voluntary Aid Detachment, State of South Australia.
- Arthur William Kidd, Superintendent of the Salisbury Prison, and acting Inspector of Prisons, Southern Rhodesia.
- Augusta Drever Fleming Leishman, Hospitality Secretary, Victoria League, Edinburgh.
- Laura Manning, Treasurer of the Women's Patriotic Association, Newfoundland.
- Angus John McKenzie, JP. For services in connection with philanthropic and patriotic societies in the State of Tasmania.
- Ruby Clark McLaren, a prominent honorary organiser of many patriotic and charitable appeals in the State of Tasmania.
- William Sibley. For public services in the State of South Australia.
- Dorothy Marie Gladys Thompson, Organising Secretary, Empire Societies' War Hospitality Committee.
- Marguerite Louise Bramble. For public services in Bombay.
- Khan Bahadur Saiyid Abdul Hasan, Secretary, Board of Revenue, United Provinces.
- Richard Charles Arbery, Inspector of Metallurgy, Government of India, Tatanagar.
- Herbert Ernest Ashby, Officer Supervisor, General Staff Branch, General Headquarters, India.
- Khan Bahadur Bahrain Khan, of Thana, Baezai, Swat State, North-West Frontier Province.
- Major Sohrab Rustomji Bamji, JP, Officer Commanding, Cyclist Messenger Service, ARP Organisation, Bombay.
- Chakrapany Aiyengar Rama Bhadran, Indian Forest Service, Forest Utilisation Officer, Gauhati, Assam.
- Captain Dudley Hugh Biscoe, Indian Political Service, Assistant Political Agent, Orissa States Agency.
- Nigel Alfred Kennor Bowden, Officer-in-charge, Mechanical Transport and Water Supply, Secunderabad Cantonment, Hyderabad (Deccan).
- Captain John Brebner, Indian Medical Service, Civil Surgeon, Chittagong, Bengal.
- Wilfred George Bunyan, Assistant Works Manager, Bengal-Nagpur Railway Workshops, Nagpur, Central Provinces and Berar.
- Henry George Burns, Indian Service of Engineers, Executive Engineer, Public Works Department, Irrigation Branch, United Provinces.
- John Meredith Charles, Deputy Commissioner, Gonda, United Provinces.
- Prabhat Mukul Chaudhuri, ARP Officer, Chittagong, Bengal.
- Captain Inder Sen Chopra, Indian Political Service, Director of Supplies in Baluchistan.
- Khan Bahadur Jehangir Ratanji Colabawala, Chief Engineer, Khairpur State.
- Albert Vivian D'Costa, Assistant Executive Engineer, Chief Engineer's Office, Great Indian Peninsula Railway, Bombay.
- Rao Bahadur Mohanji Naranji Desai, Superintendent of Police, Special Branch, Criminal Investigation Department, Bombay City, Bombay.
- Dilawar Hussein Khan, Indian Forest Service, Forest Research Officer, Orissa.
- Charles Henry Disney, Additional District Magistrate, Delhi.
- Nandolal Ganguli, Principal, King Edward College, Amravati, Central Provinces and Berair.
- Sasanka Sekhar Gupta, Assistant Superintendent, Way and Works, Sahebganj, East Indian Railway.
- John Hannah, District Mechanical Engineer (Munitions Officer), Bengal and Assam Railway, Kanchrapara.
- John Begby Haskins, Resident Engineer, Oudh and Tirhut Railway, Benares.
- Thomas Frederic Gerald Hepburn, Controller of Leather and Tanning Industries, Directorate General of Supply, Department of Supply, Government of India.
- Khanchand Bhopatrai Hira, Divisional Executive Engineer, North-Western Railway, Karachi.
- George Archibald Hunt, Divisional Engineer, Telegraphs, Lahore Division.
- Jai Gopal, Honorary Assistant Treasurer, His Excellency the Viceroy's War Purposes Fund.
- Eric John Jenrier, Indian Police, District Superintendent of Police, Thar and Parkar District, Sind.
- William Sidney Charles Macey, Assistant Master (Officiating), Currency Note Press.
- Madras Mahadeva Mudaliar, Superintendent, Survey of India.
- George Mackenzie Martin, Manager, Reliance Jute Mill, Bhatpara, 24-Parganas, Bengal.
- John Arthur Meneze, District Signal Engineer, East Indian Railway, Moradabad.
- Rai Bahadur Chandi Prasad Misra, District Engineer, Monghyr, Bihar.
- Kalidas Mitra, MB, DPH, DTM&H, Officer-in-charge, Nutrition Scheme, Bihar.
- Khan Bahadur Maulvi Munir Ahmad, Extra Assistant Commissioner and Personal Indian Assistant to the Agent to the Governor-General in Baluchistan.
- William Arthur Murray, Signal Engineer, Oudh and Tirhut Railway, Gorakhpur.
- Frederick Percival Palsett, Secretary to the Chief Justice, and Secretary, Council of Law Reporting, High Court, Calcutta, Bengal.
- Muhammad Junaid Quraishi, MRCS, LRCP, Colonel in State Forces and Chief Medical Officer, Rampur State.
- Mir Rashed Ahmed Pilot Instructor, Bihar Flying Club, Bihar.
- Khan Bahadur Chaudhri Riasat Ali, Member, Punjab Legislative Assembly Advocate, Gujranwala, Punjab.
- John Jitendranath Rudra, PhD, AMInstEE, Principal, College of Engineering, Madras.
- Rai Bahadur Diwan Chand Saini, Advocate and Vice-Chairman, District Board, Gurdaspur, Punjab.
- William Hanbury Saumarez Smith, Indian Civil Service, Under Secretary, Governor-General's Secretariat (Public).
- Thomas Arthur Sharpe, Indian Civil Service, President, Manipur State Darbar.
- Edward John Shepherd, Principal, Constables Training School, Nathnagar, Bhagalpur, Bihar.
- Bernard Sinclair-Jones, Deputy Mint Master (temporary), Lahore.
- Captain Sardar Bahadur Ram Roop Singh, OBI, IOM, Extra Assistant Recruiting Officer, Ghazipur, United Provinces.
- Ralph Jeanrenaud Smith, Indian Forest Service, Divisional Forest Officer, Kanara Northern Division, Dharwar, Bombay.
- Andrew Herbert, Southern Indian Civil Service, Deputy Secretary to the Government of Madras in the Public Department.
- Guruswami Sastri Swaminathan, Under Secretary to the Government of India in the Department of Commerce.
- Ronald Macgregor Thomson, Superintendent, Makum Tea Company, Ltd., Margherita, Assam.
- Hubert Gerard Pieter Vorstermans, Manager, Spencer's Cigar Factory, Dindigul, Madura District, Madras.
- Keith Lloyd Hamilton Wadley, AMICE, Indian Service of Engineers, Executive Engineer, Viceregal Estates Division.
- The Reverend William Troth Williams, Missionary, Gurgaon, Punjab.
- Rowland Wright, ACGI, AMIEE, Power Station Superintendent, Madras Electric Supply Corporation, Ltd., Madras.
- Subrahmanya Venkateswaran, Assistant Secretary to the Government of Burma, Defence Department.
- George Patrick Kirkham, Deputy Registrar, High Court of Judicature at Rangoon.
- Roderick Macrae Antill, MC, Senior Agricultural Assistant, Nyasaland Protectorate.
- Marie Margaret Bayley. For social welfare work in British Guiana.
- Joseph Waugh Bulman, Superintendent, Cyprus Railway.
- William Thomas Chappell, District Locomotive Superintendent, Kenya and Uganda Railways and Harbours Administration.
- Terence Bertrand Comissiong, Colonial Treasurer, Grenada, Windward Islands.
- Silvio Dandria, Assistant Secretary to the Government of Malta.
- Andrew Mervyn Dibble, Assistant Engineer, Public Works Department, Northern Rhodesia.
- Frederick Ibikunie George. For social welfare services in Nigeria.
- Joseph Etienne Houareau, Chief Clerk, Chief Dispenser and Anaesthetist, Medical Department, Seychelles.
- Royston Edmund de Silva Jayasundere Proctor, Supreme Court, and Notary Public, Ceylon.
- Reginald Thomas Ledger, Superintendent, British Resident's Office, Trans-Jordan.
- Charles William Lynn, Colonial Agricultural Service, Senior Agricultural Superintendent, Gold Coast.
- Milton Augustus Strieby Margai, MB, BS, Medical Officer, Sierra Leone.
- The Venerable Archdeacon Ezra Douglas Martinson. For services to education in the Gold Coast.
- Selene Millstein, Clerical Officer, District Commissioner's Office, Haifa, Palestine.
- Captain David Milne, MC, Senior Superintendent of Prisons, Tanganyika Territory.
- David Loftus Morgan, Colonial Administrative Service, District Officer, Kenya.
- Robert James Stewart Orwin, Colonial Audit Service, Senior Assistant Auditor, Nigeria.
- Richard Hercules Wingfield Pakenham, Colonial Administrative Service, District Commissioner, Zanzibar Protectorate.
- The Reverend John Herbert Poole. For public and social services in Trinidad.
- George Cuthbert Reed, Staff Officer, Special Police, Kenya.
- Ida Samson. For social welfare work in Ceylon.
- Emily Sprott. For social and child welfare services in the British Solomon Islands Protectorate.
- Henry Douglas Tucker. For social welfare services in Jamaica.
- Thomas Yirrell Watson, Colonial Agricultural Service, Agricultural Officer, Kenya.
- Amihud Yehuda Goor, Assistant Conservator of Forests, Palestine.
- Naif Amin Hamzeh, MD, Medical Officer, Government Hospital, Haifa, Palestine.
- Mohammed Effendi Kemal, Superintendent of the Press Bureau, Palestine.

=== Order of the Companions of Honour (CH) ===
- Ernest Walter Hives, MBE. For services in the design of aero-engines.
- The Right Honourable Henry, Baron Snell, CBE, LLD, Captain of the Honourable Corps of Gentlemen-at-Arms. Deputy Leader of the House of Lords.

=== Companion of the Imperial Service Order (ISO) ===
Home Civil Service

- Edward Halsey Bourne, Director, Investigation Branch, General Post Office.
- Frank Everard Cook, MBE, Deputy Establishment Officer, Ministry of Fuel and Power.
- Francis William Filbee, Assistant Director of Contracts, Ministry of Aircraft Production.
- John William Glennie, Head of Branch, Ministry of Food.
- James Hook, Accountant, Board of Education.
- Lewis Montgomery Jones, Senior Executive Officer, Air Ministry.
- John Oliver McFadden, Deputy Director of Audit, Exchequer and Audit Department.
- Alexander Cruikshank Milne, lately Chief Accountant, War Office.
- John Clarence Monahan, Assistant Chief Instructions Officer, Ministry of Labour and National Service.
- Harry John Pearman, Senior Staff Officer, Ministry of Health.
- William Perry, OBE, Chief Clerk, Royal Mint.
- Arthur Silvester, FSI, Superintending Quantity Surveyor, Ministry of Works.
- Adam Smail, lately General Inspector, Department of Health for Scotland.
- Leonard Smith, 1st Class Inspector, Board of Customs and Excise.
- Arthur Roger Straw, MBE, Assistant Director of Stores, Admiralty.
- Thomas Daniel Williams, MVO, DCM, lately Superintendent, Master of the Household's Department, Buckingham Palace (dated 1 April 1943).

Dominion Civil Services

- Hugh Hunter Cowperthwaite, MD, MS, Visiting Surgeon, Department of Public Health and Welfare, Newfoundland.
- Horace Clitheroe Smith, Secretary for Agriculture, State of Tasmania.
- Leonard Keith Ward, DSc, Director of Mines and Government Geologist, State of South Australia.

Indian Civil Services

- Lieutenant Alec Eustace Azevedo, MBE, Superintendent, Foreign Post, Bombay.
- Joel Jefferson Buck, Confidential Assistant to the Governor of Bihar.
- Harold Henry Creed, Deputy Director, Surveys, Assam.
- Alexander Joseph Gonsalves, Superintendent, Central Jail, Cannanore, Malabar District, Madras.

Colonial Service

- Ellen Maud Carey, Colonial Postmaster, Falkland Islands.
- Ernest Inverarity Christie, Accountant, Central Accounts Department, Nyasaland Protectorate.
- John Ernest Jones, Registrar of the High Court, Nyasaland Protectorate.
- Mensah Lamptey, Accountant, Posts and Telegraphs Department, Gold Coast.
- Hugh Henry Pilgrim, Inspector of Schools, Grenada, Windward Islands.
- Alan Percy Carlyle Dos Santos, Deputy Accountant-General, Trinidad.
- Johannes Welsing, Colonial Administrative Service, Assistant Colonial Secretary, Gold Coast.
- Arthur Emmanuel Perera Wijeyagunewardene, Assistant Postmaster-General, Ceylon.

=== Imperial Service Medal ===
- Abdur Rahman, Sub-Inspector (Retd.), Telegraphs, Bengal and Assam Circle.

=== Kaisar-i-Hind Medal ===
In Gold

- Grizel, the Honourable Lady Hope (wife of Captain the Honourable Sir Arthur Hope, GCIE, MC, Governor of Madras).
- Elsie, Lady Stewart (wife of Sir Thomas Alexander Stewart, KCSL, KCIE, ICS, lately Governor of Bihar).
- Her Highness Durre Shehvar Durdana Begum Sahiba, Princess of Berar, Hyderabad (Deccan).
- Marjorie Wilhelmina Jesson, Secretary, St. Stephen's Mission Hospital, Delhi.
- Alice Maud Ward, Missionary, Sind.
- Galen Fisher Scudder, MD, DTM, Scudder Memorial Hospital, Ranipet, North Arcot District, Madras.

==== Bar to the Kaisar-i-Hind Medal ====
- Sam Higginbottom, Principal, Agricultural Institute, Naini, Allahabad, United Provinces.

=== British Empire Medal (BEM) ===
Military Division

Royal Navy

- Chief Petty Officer Edgar Henry Brown, P.222306.
- Chief Petty Officer Joseph Hamilton Charles, C/J.48870.
- Chief Petty Officer Llewelyn Dawson, C/J.95232.
- Chief Petty Officer Robert John Hamilton, P/J.33875
- Chief Petty Officer William Thomas Jarvis, D/J.96136.
- Chief Petty Officer Michael Jennings, D/J.1734.
- Chief Petty Officer Charles Frederick Johns, D/J.20150.
- Chief Petty Officer Fred Lucas, D/J.41311.
- Chief Petty Officer Horace Albert Marshall, C/JX.147508.
- Chief Petty Officer Robert Potts, D/J.15509.
- Chief Petty Officer Thomas William Prior, C/J.114764.
- Chief Petty Officer Victor Tom Stent, D/J.32738.
- Chief Petty Officer Thomas George Tallyn, P/J41461.
- Chief Yeoman of Signals Frederick Henry Glithero, P/J.22518.
- Chief Yeoman of Signals Sidney Hills, P.236009.
- Chief Yeoman of Signals Augustus George Hodgson, D.224070.
- Chief Yeoman of Signals Horace Bertram Margetson, C.199208.
- Chief Yeoman of Signals George Whitby, DSM, C.182090.
- Chief Petty Officer Telegraphist Arthur Edward Snellock, P/JX.133666.
- Chief Engine Room Artificer Francis Bailey, C.271322.
- Chief Engine Room Artificer James Ralph Bessant, C/M.35650.
- Chief Engine Room Artificer Alexander Black, C/M.2433.
- Chief Engine Room Artificer John Knox McKenzie, C/MX.54278.
- Chief Engine Room Artificer Frederick Herbert Martin, D/M.6995.
- Chief Engine Room Artificer John Strathearn, C/M.22779.
- Chief Engine Room Artificer Allan Harry Terrett, C/M.1580.
- Chief Engine Room Artificer First Class Arthur Gordon Laverick, C/365E.C.R.N.R.
- Chief Mechanician Ernest Murch Haywood, D/KX.87186.
- Chief Mechanician Andrew Smith, P/M.66199.
- Chief Stoker Charles Philip Jordan, P/K.3407.
- Chief Stoker Edward Skeen, C/K.66048.
- Chief Stoker Alfred Charles White, P/KX.75251.
- Chief Ordnance Artificer John Henry Wardil, C/M.3200.
- Chief Shipwright William John Mitchell, D/M.28108.
- Chief Shipwright Sidney Edward Partridge, C/M.6353.
- Sick Berth Chief Petty Officer Joshua Alexander, P/M.2547.
- Sick Berth Chief Petty Officer John Albert Guenigault, C/M.652.
- Chief Petty Officer Writer Albert Fidelis Fuchter, P.37582.
- Chief Petty Officer Writer John Frederick Helmore, D/MX.5063O.
- Chief Petty Officer Writer Charles Beresford Howe, D/M.7641.
- Chief Petty Officer Writer William Clarence Jago, D/MX.46798.
- Chief Petty Officer Writer Arthur Charles Neal, D/MX.48823.
- Chief Petty Officer Writer Jeremiah O'Connor, D/M.2766.
- Chief Petty Officer Writer Thomas Roddam, C/MX.46405.
- Chief Petty Officer Writer William Francis George Rundle, D/MX.46299.
- Supply Chief Petty Officer Thomas William Wortley Brightman, D/M.37779.
- Supply Chief Petty Officer George Fisher, C/M.37897.
- Supply Chief Petty Officer Sir Roger Edward Arthur Wibrew, C/M.32O24.
- Master-at-Arms William Samuel Jones, D/M.40066.
- Master-at-Arms Robert William Horder Rye, C/M.39920.
- Chief Petty Officer Cook Albert Leonard Edwards, P/M.32810.
- Second Hand Andrew McLennan Morgan, LT/JX.280605, Royal Naval Patrol Service.
- Shipwright First Class William John Dodridge, D/M.19609.
- Blacksmith Second Class Leonard Williams, C/MX. 50804.
- Air Artificer Fourth Class William Allison Blythman, FAA/FX.75165.
- Air Artificer Fourth Class Graham Charles Newman White, FAA/FX.75176.
- Sergeant Major William John Gilliam, Royal Marines.
- Temporary Sergeant Major Harold Wilfred Solly, Royal Marines.
- Temporary Sergeant Major George William Barnes, Royal Marines.
- Company Sergeant Major (acting Quartermaster-Sergeant) William Thomas Stephen Latter, R.M.B.2625, Royal Marines.
- Colour Sergeant (acting Temporary Company Sergeant Major) Charles Henry O'Brien, Ply.21249, Royal Marines.
- Acting Quartermaster Sergeant William Chadwick Bould, Ply.211710, Royal Marines.
- Colour Sergeant George Samuel Burridge, Po.17617, Royal Marines.
- Colour Sergeant Maynard Arthur Raven, Ch.22994, Royal Marines.
- Staff Clerk John Brown, Ch.X323, Royal Marines.
- Petty Officer Frederick George Brady, P/JX.140454.
- Petty Officer Adolphus William Critoph, P/J.13365.
- Petty Officer Michael Alphonsus Keehan, D/J.35703.
- Petty Officer Frank Edward George Leader, P/J21904.
- Temporary Petty Officer Telegraphist John Thompson Kipling, C/JX.142742.
- Temporary Petty Officer Telegraphist Herbert Henry Payne, D/J.56656.
- Stoker Petty Officer James Albert Frank Brock, C/K.16476.
- Stoker Petty Officer Albert Henry Pyle, P/K.58711.
- Stoker Petty Officer Joseph Hewitt, D/K.62239.
- Temporary Stoker Petty Officer Edward Harry Hopper, C/K.50241.
- Sick Berth Petty Officer William Henry Doidge, D/MX.52359.
- Sick Berth Petty Officer Clifford Coaker Horn, D/MX.55007.
- Sick Berth Petty Officer Edward Herbert Thompson, P/MX.45707.
- Petty Officer Writer Laurence Parsons, CH/DX.49.
- Regulating Petty Officer Robert McFarlane, D/M.40176.
- Regulating Petty Officer John Percy Rance, P/MX.60143.
- Acting Regulating Petty-Officer Ernest Edward Johnson, P/M.40266.
- Petty Officer Air Mechanic (E) Robert Thompson, FAA/FX.75104.
- Temporary Supply Petty Officer Arthur William Viles, P/MX.58569.
- Engineman Andrew Wood, LT/KX.124624, Royal Naval Patrol Service.
- Leading Seaman Frederick Barrett, D/JX.132461.
- Acting Leading Seaman Charles Francis Easterbrook, D/JX.218303.
- Leading Stoker Ralph Sidney Burn, D/KX.82176.
- Acting Leading Wireman Stanley Lynch, P/MX.67288.
- Leading Supply Assistant James Taylor, P/MX.59957.
- Lance Corporal Arthur Walter Bastin, 11963, Royal Marines.
- Corporal Albert Edward Vaughan, ChX.1036, Royal Marines.
- Ordinary Seaman William Alfred Buttell, C/JX.247643.
- Chief Wren Ellen Alford, 1069, Women's Royal Naval Service.
- Chief Wren Eileen Florence Toogood, 4857, Women's Royal Naval Service.
- Petty Officer Wren Elsie May Reid, 8464, Women's Royal Naval Service.
- Petty Officer Wren Marion Hodgson Smith, 8056, Women's Royal Naval Service.
- Petty Officer Writer Kathleen Violet Harris, 2742, Women's Royal Naval Service.
- Petty Officer Wren Beatrice May Rooke, 2391, Women's Royal Naval Service.
- Writer Constance Helen Drummond Duff, 30759, Women's Royal Naval Service.

Army

- Sergeant Haroun Abzagh, Trans-Jordan Frontier Force.
- Lance Sergeant Wilfred Armitage, West Riding Home Guard.
- No. 1466066 Sergeant (acting Staff Sergeant) Horace William Gordon Bell, Royal Artillery.
- No. 4977154 Sapper Harold Blair, Royal Engineers.
- No. S/59997 Staff Sergeant Joseph Henry Carlile, Royal Army Service Corps.
- No. 13072261 Corporal John Broadhurst Edwards, Pioneer Corps.
- Sergeant William Ellis, Shropshire Home Guard.
- No. S/819540 Staff Sergeant William Jesse Elmer, Royal Army Service Corps.
- Sergeant John Fell, Lancashire Home Guard.
- No. W/34388 Lance Sergeant (acting Sergeant) Eleanor Haigh, Auxiliary Territorial Service.
- No. 4909955 Private Edward Hall, The South Staffordshire Regiment.
- No. 2313337 Sergeant James Harper, Royal Engineers.
- No. 1882934 Lance Sergeant Leslie Robert Horsham, Royal Engineers.
- Sergeant Abdel Rask Assad Ismail, Trans-Jordan Frontier Force.
- No. 4037780 Corporal (acting) Edward Jones, Army Air Corps.
- No. W/22540 Corporal Maisie Jones, Auxiliary Territorial Service.
- Sergeant Richard Thomas Jones, Monmouthshire Home Guard.
- No. 5349364 Sergeant Albert Henry Kempston, The Royal Berkshire Regiment (Princess Charlotte of Wales's).
- No. 2196010 Private Thomas Lavender, Pioneer Corps.
- No. 2048863 Sergeant Bertie Frederick Lemon, Royal Artillery.
- Staff Sergeant George James McKandry, New Zealand Military Forces.
- No. S/4034791 Staff Sergeant James Riou Massie, Royal Army Service Corps.
- No. 407147 Sergeant Joseph McMahon, 5th Royal Inniskilling Dragoon Guards.
- Sergeant William Millar, Angus Home Guard.
- No. 4031508 Colour Sergeant (acting Warrant Officer Class II, Company Sergeant Major) David Glyndwr Morgan, The King's Shropshire Light Infantry.
- No. 2350720 Signalman Jim Newell, Royal Corps of Signals.
- Sergeant Charles O'Malley, Sussex Home Guard.
- No. 7633922 Sergeant Albert Eric Porter, Royal Army Ordnance Corps.
- No. W/661075 Sergeant Beatrice Alice Rishworth, Voluntary Aid Detachment.
- No. 2921644 Sergeant David Ronald, Royal Artillery.
- No. 4272615 Sergeant Harold Bolton Rutherford, Army Physical Training Corps.
- No. W/564050 Corporal (Clerk) Eva Margaret Sewart, Voluntary Aid Detachment.
- Company-Quartermaster-Sergeant Harold Sebastian Sircom, Surrey Home Guard.
- Lance Corporal Martin Marshall Small, The Wellington West Coast Regiment, New Zealand Military Forces.
- No. 5173065 Sergeant Arthur Whiting Smith, Royal Engineers.
- No. 10350200 Acting Sergeant Douglas Holdich Smith, Intelligence Corps.
- No. 5826168 Sergeant Stephen Walter Smith, The Suffolk Regiment.
- Sergeant Henry Stedman, Surrey Home Guard.
- No. S/1896532 Staff Sergeant (acting Warrant Officer Class I Staff Sergeant Major) Henry Maurice Thackray, Royal Army Service Corps.
- Sergeant William George Tipper, North Riding Home Guard.
- No. 18234 Sergeant Norah Walker, Auxiliary Territorial Service.
- Platoon Sergeant Albert John Watkins, Herefordshire Home Guard.
- No. 2582470 Signalman Walter Charles Webb, Royal Corps of Signals.
- No. W/40301 Acting Company Sergeant Major Eileen Whitehead, Auxiliary Territorial Service.

Royal Air Force

- 560010 Flight Sergeant James Francis Agutter.
- 565523 Flight Sergeant Harry Casey.
- 565478 Flight Sergeant Harry Cheers.
- 348027 Flight Sergeant John Clegg.
- 622120 Flight Sergeant John Navarino Fellows Edwards.
- 19048 Flight Sergeant Reginald Arthur Emerton.
- 562978 Flight Sergeant Robert Fox.
- 1375002 Flight Sergeant Robert Henry Hayes.
- 352675 Flight Sergeant Albert William Lee.
- 157884 Flight Sergeant Ian Mackintosh.
- 358768 Flight Sergeant Cyril Roger Clifford Rutter.
- 560928 Flight Sergeant Charles George Smith.
- 364733 Flight Sergeant Walter Springate.
- 508031 Flight Sergeant Arthur Stephenson.
- 363764 Flight Sergeant John Frederick Turner.
- 286662 Flight Sergeant David Ludgate Ward.
- 561406 Flight Sergeant William Robert Warren.
- 568327 Acting Flight Sergeant Arthur Hale.
- 565621 Acting Flight Sergeant Albert Ernest Morgan.
- 967606 Acting Flight Sergeant Clifford Allan Sagar.
- 1182944 Acting Flight Sergeant Ronald Sells.
- 744734 Acting Flight Sergeant William Charles George Tracey, Royal Air Force Volunteer Reserve.
- 156747 Acting Flight Sergeant Hubert Walter Thornett.
- 509285 Acting Flight Sergeant Herbert Charles Ward.
- 810118 Sergeant Patrick Mathew Bannon, Auxiliary Air Force.
- 1164394 Sergeant Frederick Albert James Carter.
- 347849 Sergeant William Thomas Coombs.
- 525362 Sergeant James Francis Davies.
- 522234 Sergeant Harry Alfred Thomas Harber.
- 365860 Sergeant Frederick Stanley Harding.
- 522685 Sergeant George Hardy.
- 539259 Sergeant Gordon Allan McLoughlin.
- 1063109 Sergeant John Simm Pringle.
- 816084 Sergeant Thomas Richard Patrick Roberts, Auxiliary Air Force.
- 981111 Sergeant Thomas Timperley.
- 529078 Sergeant Edward Watson.
- 905748 Acting Sergeant Wilfred Gordon Lock.
- 542440 Acting Sergeant Victor Albert Edward Wicklow.
- 918132 Corporal Dennis Bird.
- 551351 Corporal Hugh Fraser.
- 574495 Corporal James Lorimer Gutteridge.
- 1263947 Corporal John Henry Smith.
- 1171939 Corporal Stanley Ernest Stone.
- 1082889 Leading Aircraftman Frederick Walter Flint.
- 974841 Leading Aircraftman Herbert Alfred Garnham.
- 1089030 Leading Aircraftman Kenneth Sunderland.
- 551071 Leading Aircraftman Thomas Edward Thompson.
- 1160539 Leading Aircraftman Richard Hulme Guy Triner.
- 950672 Leading Aircraftman Joseph Turner.
- 1366452 Leading Aircraftman Charles William Badger Young.
- 942070 Aircraftman 2nd Class Joseph Carlyle Blackburn.
- Aus.5140 Flight Sergeant Robert William Raebel, Royal Australian Air Force.
- Can/R.141693 Flight Sergeant Wesley Guard Tomkins, Royal Canadian Air Force.
- N.Z.780010 Flight Sergeant George Joseph Goodsell, Royal New Zealand Air Force.
- N.Z.413624 Sergeant Craig Martyn Renner, Royal New Zealand Air Force.
- N.Z.39405 Corporal Alan Stuart Paterson, Royal New Zealand Air Force.
- 421326 Sergeant Florence Celeste, Women's Auxiliary Air Force.

Civil Division

United Kingdom

- Harry Albert Victor Abbott, Works Manager, Chambon Ltd.
- Arthur Adams, Setter, Fuze Department, George Kent Ltd.
- Charges Agg, Dock Labourer, London.
- Robert Aitman, Boatswain, Merchant Navy.
- Charles Aldridge, Foreman Plater, Harland & Wolff Ltd.
- Robert Calaghan Allan, Head Foreman Plater, Greenock Dockyard Co. Ltd.
- Bachameah Jeenat Allee, Engine-room Serang, Merchant Navy.
- Bertie Robert Allen, Chief Steward, Merchant Navy.
- Frank Allen, Foreman, Firestone Tyre & Rubber Co. Ltd.
- Robert James Allen, Station Officer, Coastguard Service, Ministry of War Transport.
- Themistocle Anastasiu, Chief Steward, Merchant Navy.
- Joseph Anderson, Electrician, Swan, Hunter & Wigham Richardson Ltd.
- Albert Arthur Andrews, Section Foreman, Lehmann Archer & Lane Ltd.
- Fanny Louise Arnold, Sorting Clerk and Telegraphist, Head Post Office, Abingdon.
- Irene Arnold, Assistant, Cypher Office, RAF Headquarters, Malta.
- Walter John Arnold, Jig Tool and Gauge Hardener, Mollart Engineering Co. Ltd.
- Margaret Atherton, Inspector, Pollard Bearings Ltd.
- Thomas Bagley, Transport Foreman, Imperial Chemical Industries Ltd.
- Percy Mozart Bailey, Ganger, Kettering, London, Midland & Scottish Railway Company.
- William Bainbridge, Foreman Fitter, Vickers-Armstrongs Ltd.
- Sarah Jane Bartlett, Forewoman, William Edwards & Sons (Bridport) Ltd.
- James Barton, Foreman, Greenwood & Batley.
- Lilian Baskeyfield, Assistant Forewoman, Royal Ordnance Factory, Ministry of Supply.
- Thomas Bates, Able Seaman and Lamp Trimmer, Merchant Navy.
- Albert Batey, Head Foreman of Machine Shop, Clarke, Chapman & Co. Ltd.
- John Embury Battin, Goods Foreman, Birkenhead, Great Western Railway Company.
- Alexander Baxter, Second Fisherman of a Steam Trawler.
- George Baxter, Dock Labourer, Leith.
- Cecil John Bayliss, Grinder, Austin Motor Co. Ltd.
- Thomas Beardsmore, DCM, Office Keeper, Ministry of Aircraft Production.
- Thomas Beck, Foreman Boilermaker, Harland & Wolff Ltd.
- Albert Victor Bennett, Signal and Telegraph Supervisor, Eastleigh, Southern Railway Company. For services to Civil Defence.
- Hilda Bennett, Chargehand, British Aluminium Co. Ltd.
- Charles Bernard, Chief Steward, Merchant Navy.
- Jack Berry, Foreman Fitter, Short Bros Ltd.
- Prudence Berry, Forewoman, Gauge Department, Hoffmann Manufacturing Co. Ltd.
- Cecil George Birch, Civilian DF Operator, Bomber Command, Air Ministry.
- Harry Birch, Dock Labourer, Scruttons Ltd.
- Henry Stoddard Bishop, Chargehand Toolmaker, Monotype Corporation Ltd.
- Hilda Mary Blackburn, General Leader, YMCA Services Canteen, Bletchley Station.
- James Edis-Blewitt, Planer-machinist, Arthur Pattison Ltd.
- George Ernest Bohey, Shift Engineer, Middle East Command, Air Ministry.
- Thomas Bolton, Foreman Turner, Brown Bros & Co. Ltd.
- Harold Bond, Supervisor, Civil Defence Rescue Service, Exmouth.
- Frank Bones, Carpenter, Merchant Navy.
- Albert Edward Bonner, Able Seaman, Merchant Navy.
- William Ewart Bosher, Foreman of Trades, Maintenance Command, Air Ministry.
- James Boyle, Greaser, Merchant Navy.
- James Arthur Bradley, Centre Lathe Turner, Sheepbridge Coal & Iron Company.
- Charles Bradshaw, Chief Engineer of a Steam Trawler.
- Arthur Bright, Instrument Maker, Cambridge Instrument Co. Ltd.
- James Stephens Brodie, Donkeyman, Merchant Navy.
- Henry Edward Brooker, Acting First Class Draughtsman, Naval Ordnance Department, Admiralty, Canada.
- Frank Brown, Divisional Head Warden, Civil Defence Wardens Service, Derby.
- Kenneth Charles Brown, Works Superintendent, De Havilland Aircraft Co. Ltd.
- Leslie Richmond Brown, Company Officer, No. 12 (Cambridge) Area, National Fire Service.
- Robert Brown, Lieutenant, Dundee Police Force. For services to Civil Defence.
- Sara Miriam Browne, Supervisor, Telephones, Post Office, Belfast.
- Archibald Brownlee, Boatswain, Merchant Navy.
- Lyon Buchanan, Fieldsman, Home Grown Flax Production Department, Ministry of Supply.
- Thomas Budge, Skipper of a Motor Fishing Boat.
- Leonard Ronald Bullinaria, Acting Inspector of Storehousemen, Royal Victoria Yard, Deptford.
- Cyril Inglis Burns, Training Officer, Civil Defence Casualty Services, Norwich.
- Reginald John Butcher, Inspector, Folkestone Police. For services to Civil Defence.
- Edward Byrne, Acting Foreman of Engineer Branch, HM Dockyard, Simonstown.
- Charles Caffrey, Fireman, Merchant Navy.
- Michael William Caine, Machine Shop Foreman, Enfield Cycle Co. Ltd.
- Irene May Frances Cameron, Plotter, Operations Room, RAF Headquarters, Malta.
- Alexander Graham Campbell, Chief Steward, Merchant Navy.
- Charles Archibald Carter, Superintendent of Messengers and Office Keeper, 10 Downing Street.
- Arthur Gerald Casey, Evangelist, Church Army. For services to the Forces in the Middle East.
- Candido Castanos, Fireman and Trimmer Greaser, Merchant Navy.
- Edward Owen Chapman, Foreman, Gent & Co. Ltd.
- Porteous Chapman, Chief Carpenter, Merchant Navy.
- Richard Hall Charlton, Technical Assistant to Works Manager, Peter Brotherhood Ltd.
- Henry Appleby Churnside, Chief and Ship's Cook, Merchant Navy.
- Luke Clarke, Foreman Founder, Optical Department, Chance Bros.
- Francis Charles Cobbledick, Senior Company Officer, No. 19 (Plymouth) Area, National Fire Service.
- George Edward Cobden, Sergeant, Salisbury City Police. For services to Civil Defence.
- Kenneth Archibald Cockle, Turner, Dowty Equipment Ltd.
- Morris Edward Colbeck, Deputy Head Warden, Civil Defence Wardens Service and Deputy Head Fire Guard, Abbey Division, Lincoln.
- Harold William Coles, Acting Foreman, HM Dockyard, Sheerness.
- Ethel Collins, Supervisor, Crompton Parkinson Ltd.
- Harold Godfrey Constable, Foreman, Campbell & Isherwood Ltd.
- Gertrude Eileen Cooper, Telephone Supervisor, Southampton Docks, Southern Railway Company. For services to Civil Defence.
- Alfred Davies Corrigall, Employed in a Department of the Foreign Office.
- Harold Stanley Cox, Toolroom Foreman, Newman Hender & Co.
- Charles Cranfield, Night Foreman, Camberwell Garage, London Passenger Transport Board. For services to Civil Defence.
- Reginald Spenser Crighton, Inspector, Eastbourne Borough Police. For services to Civil Defence.
- John Croft, Chief Warden's Staff Officer, Civil Defence Wardens Service, Co. Durham.
- Joseph Crosbie, Engine-room Storekeeper, Merchant Navy.
- William Richard Crossbie, Chargeman, Vickers-Armstrongs Ltd.
- Percival Edward Crosson, Shops Superintendent, Royal Aircraft Establishment, Ministry of Aircraft Production.
- George Edward Curd, Fireman, Merchant Navy.
- Harold Dalton, Docker, Manchester.
- Bertram William Davies, Foreman of M/T, Maintenance Command, Air Ministry.
- Joseph William Davies, Chief Steward, Merchant Navy.
- Ernest Davis, Foreman, Erecting Shop, Airspeed (1934) Ltd.
- John Dawson, Foreman, Gun Department, Vickers-Armstrongs Ltd.
- Arthur James Denzey, Senior Laboratory Assistant, Admiralty Outstation.
- George De Silva, Chief Steward, Merchant Navy.
- William Thomas Douglas, Boatswain, Merchant Navy.
- James Dow, Chief and Ship's Cook, Merchant Navy.
- Reginald Arthur Drake, Staff Officer for Civil Defence First Aid Parties, Southend-on-Sea.
- Gerald Walton Drewitt, Staff Officer, Civil Defence Casualty Services, Canterbury.
- Timothy Topping Duff, Trawl Fisherman of a Steam Trawler.
- James Anthony Duncan, Foreman, Northern Aluminium Company.
- Frederick James Dunk, Head Observer, Royal Observer Corps.
- Robert Alfred Durent, Foreman Ship's Electrician, A. Anderson & Son Ltd.
- Charles Maynard Dutton, Foreman, Sheet Metal Shop, Aeronautical & General Instruments Ltd.
- Eugene Duvoisin, Chef, Merchant Navy.
- James Dyson, Draughtsman, Vulcan Foundry Ltd.
- George William Easson, Chargeman Fitter, Richardsons Westgarth & Co. Ltd.
- James Edwards, Storehouse Assistant, HM Dockyard, Portsmouth.
- William Stanley Eggbeer, Chief Steward, Merchant Navy.
- Frederick George Ellingham, Ganger, St. Pancras, London, Midland & Scottish Railway Company. For services to Civil Defence.
- Charles William England, Goods Agent, Portsmouth, Southern Railway Company. For services to Civil Defence.
- Alfred William Evans, Chargehand Driller, Gloucester Railway Carriage & Wagon Co. Ltd.
- John William Evans, Foreman, Brass Strip Mill, Imperial Chemical Industries Ltd.
- Henry Owen Eves, Quartermaster, Merchant Navy.
- Harry Exley, lately Shop Foreman, John Holroyd & Co. Ltd.
- James Anderson Falconer, Docker, Liverpool.
- John Mary Farrugia, Clerk of Works, Air Ministry Works Department, Kalafrana, Malta.
- John William Stanley Fielding, Area Chief Warden and Incident Officer, Civil Defence Services, Borough of Glossop.
- Arthur Ernest Fildes, Clerk of Works, Air Ministry Works Department, Luqa, Malta.
- Samuel Firth, Foreman, Jig and Tool Department, Prince Smith & Stells Ltd.
- Donald Fletcher, Quartermaster, Merchant Navy.
- Marigold Fletcher, Plotter, Operations Room, RAF Headquarters, Malta.
- Sidney Flowers, Foreman Shipwright, W. Overy & Son.
- Herbert John Folland, Electric Furnace Feeder and Unloader, W. Martin Winn Ltd.
- Albert Victor Francis, Plant Inspector, Post Office (London) Railway.
- John Fraser, Boatswain, Merchant Navy.
- Robert Fraser, Boatswain, Merchant Navy.
- Phyllis Frederick, lately Assistant, Cypher Office, RAF Headquarters, Malta.
- Frederick Charles Freeman, Mortuary Keeper, Chelsea. For services to Civil Defence.
- James Frid, Established Skilled Labourer, RN Armament Depot, Upnor.
- Edwin George Frost, Principal Storeholder, RN Armament Depot, Woolwich.
- James Fyles, Foreman, Imperial Chemical Industries (Explosives) Ltd.
- Archibald Duncan Galbraith, Cook Steward, Merchant Navy.
- Carmela Eileen Galea, Assistant, RAF Headquarters, Malta.
- Charles Henry Galvin, Designer's Assistant, Halex Ltd.
- George Sydenham Gant, Civilian Armament Instructor Grade I, Flying Training Command, Air Ministry.
- James Gardiner, MM, Principal Foreman of Stores, Maintenance Command, Air Ministry.
- Amos Arnold Garner, Foreman, Machine Shop, Vickers-Armstrongs Ltd.
- Marjorie Elizabeth Garner, Chief Woman Welfare Supervisor, Turbine Blading Department, Vickers-Armstrongs Ltd.
- James Gaughran, Chargeman of Joiners and Storewrights, Naval Store Department, Admiralty.
- Susan Gibson, Matron, Millvale Hostel, Wooler, Northumberland. For services to Civil Defence.
- John Gill, Boatswain, Merchant Navy.
- William Edward Gillard, Joiner in charge, Frederick Sage & Co. Ltd.
- Alfred William Godfrey, Filer, Royal Small Arms Factory, Ministry of Supply.
- Christopher Gordon, Foreman Stevedore, Bromborough Dock.
- John Graves, Head Warden, Civil Defence Wardens Service, Sheffield.
- Harold Ivan Thomas Greatrex, Foreman Toolmaker, James Booth & Co. (1915) Ltd.
- Hubert John Green, Progressman (Technical), RN Torpedo Factory, Greenock.
- William Griffin, Chargeman of Joiners and Storewrights, Admiralty Outstation.
- George Griffiths, Body Shop Foreman, Austin Motor Co. Ltd.
- Leonard Charles Phillip Grimbly, Technical Officer, Cable & Wireless Ltd.
- Henry Walter Grose, Sorter, London Postal Region.
- Andrew Guild, Boatswain, Merchant Navy.
- Joseph Victor Harold Gurney, Station and Yard Master, Banbury, Great Western Railway Company.
- Joseph Alfred Gwinnett, Toolroom Foreman, L. H. Newton & Co. Ltd.
- Annie Halifax, Capstan Operator, British Vacuum Cleaner & Engineering Co. Ltd.
- James Henry Hamilton, Foreman Fitter, Crossley Bros Ltd.
- Rose Hammond, Winder, C.A.V. Ltd.
- William Hammond, Skilled Setter, Royal Ordnance Factory, Ministry of Supply.
- Charles Handley, Chief Inspector, War Department Constabulary.
- James Robert Hanvey, Acting Assistant III, Admiralty Outstation.
- Charles Leo Harnett, Turner, RN Torpedo Factory, Greenock.
- William Henry House Harper, Able Seaman, Merchant Navy.
- Harry Burnett Harris, Machine Shop Superintendent, F. Perkins Ltd.
- Thomas Albert Garden Harris, Boatswain, Merchant Navy.
- Henry Hartley, Foreman Boilermaker, Cardiff Channel Dry Docks & Pontoon Co. Ltd.
- Frederick Hawkins, Blacksmith, Wolverhampton, London, Midland & Scottish Railway Company.
- Robert J. Heathwood, Company Officer, National Fire Service, Northern Ireland.
- William Helps, Sector Leader, Civil Defence Wardens Service and Head Fire Guard, Leicester.
- Mabel Ellen Henderson, Adviser, Housewives' Service, Group 9 (Surrey), Women's Voluntary Services for Civil Defence.
- John Henry, Able Seaman, Merchant Navy.
- John Hibberd, Chief Boatswain, Merchant Navy.
- Henry Hooper Hicks, Chief Steward, Merchant Navy.
- Dorothy Annie Frances Hide, Message Supervisor, Civil Defence Report and Control Service, Hammersmith.
- William Franklin Higgin, Skilled Turner, Yorkshire Engineering Supplies Company.
- Elizabeth Mary Higgins, Canteen Officer, Civil Defence Services, Birkenhead.
- Robert Hill, Head Foreman Shipwright, Cammell Laird & Co. Ltd.
- Sidney Arthur Hobbs, Skilled Workman, Class I, Bristol Telephone Area.
- Robert Black Hoggan, Established Chargeman of Fitters, RN Torpedo Depot, Rosyth.
- Thomas Frederick Hole, Engine Test Superintendent, British Overseas Airways Corporation.
- Albert Walter Holland, Operations Foreman, Home Grown Timber Department, Ministry of Supply.
- Herbert Joseph Holliday, Chief Steward, Merchant Navy.
- Thomas Holly, Cranedriver, Cardiff.
- Frank Holmes, Chargehand Setter, Automatic Department, British Manufacturing & Research Co. Ltd.
- George Holmes, Foreman Shipwright, Tees Side Bridge & Engineering Works Ltd.
- Marie Homer, Overseer, Bournville Utilities Ltd.
- Thomas William Hopkins, Fbreman, Jowett Cars Ltd.
- Joseph Horton, Toolmaker, Joseph Lucas Ltd.
- James Houghton, Furnace Foreman, Umbroc Ltd.
- William Hounsome, Greaser, Merchant Navy.
- William John Hover, Supervisor of Steel Structures, London Bridge, Southern Railway Company. For services to Civil Defence.
- Albert Edwin Hufton, Works Superintendent, S. & R. J. Everett & Co. Ltd.
- Thomas Sims Hyde, Foreman, Williams & Williams Ltd.
- Peter Ritchie Inglis, Carpenter, Merchant Navy.
- Ralph Jarvis, Foreman Fitter, James Robertson & Sons Ltd.
- Robert Jeffrey, Foreman Smith, Laird & Son Ltd.
- Charles Walter Johnstone, Principal Foreman, Royal Aircraft Establishment, Ministry of Aircraft Production.
- Frederick James Jolliffe, Principal Lighthouse Keeper, Corporation of Trinity House.
- Elizabeth Venning Jones, Manageress, Navy, Army and Air Force Institute, Northwood.
- Sidney Robert Jones, Supervisor of Outside Erection, Vickers-Armstrongs Ltd.
- Edward Keightley, Air Raid Precautions Instructor, London, Midland & Scottish Railway Company.
- Archibald Kerr, Foreman, De Havilland Aircraft Co. Ltd.
- John Edward Laurie King, Cook Steward, Merchant Navy.
- Cecil Kingdom, 2nd Class Master, Naval Armament Vessels, Admiralty.
- Hero Kuhlmann, Boatswain, Merchant Navy.
- Lueng Kwai, Quartermaster, Merchant Navy.
- Clifford Cecil Lambert, Foreman, County Industries Ltd.
- Thomas Morgan Langley, Port Transport Worker, Swansea Dock.
- Martin Larsen, Greaser, Merchant Navy.
- John Thomas Lathey, Foreman, Pymore Mill Co. Ltd.
- Joseph Law, Works Inspector, Watford, London, Midland & Scottish Railway Company. For services to Civil Defence.
- John Edward Laws, Chief Steward, Merchant Navy.
- Ernest Frank Baker Lea, Duty Controller, Royal Observer Corps.
- Councillor Arthur Sidney Leather, Chief Warden, Civil Defence Wardens Service, Borough of Stourbridge.
- Frederick Leeder, Foreman, Hawker Aircraft Co. Ltd.
- Phyllis Liddle, Assistant Forewoman, Armaments Inspection Department, Ministry of Supply.
- Orlando Lifton, Acting First Class Draughtsman, Admiralty.
- Robert Lloyd, Greaser, Merchant Navy.
- Robert Lloyd, Boatswain, Merchant Navy.
- Cecil Walter Longman, Production Designer, Pressed Steel Co. Ltd.
- William Thomas Berry Lorimer, Superintendent of Works, Ministry of Finance, Northern Ireland.
- Frederick Albert Luff, Acting Inspector of Storehousemen, HM Naval Victualling Depot, Milford Haven.
- Walter Lynch, Able Seaman and Cook, Merchant Navy.
- William John Mabbett, Rollerman, Imperial Chemical Industries Metals Ltd.
- John Joseph MacDonald, Chief Steward, Merchant Navy.
- Donald McDougall (Junior), Skipper of a Motor Boat.
- Mary McGregor, Overlooker, J. & P. Coates Ltd.
- John McGuffie, Assistant Foreman Plumber, Barclay Curie & Co. Ltd.
- Alexander McIntyre, Boatswain, Merchant Navy.
- Nicol McKechnie, Boatswain, Merchant Navy.
- Frank Cantwell Mackenzie, Curator of Original Documents, Hydrographic Department, Admiralty.
- William Berry McLaren, Chief Pharmacist, Medical Branch, General Post Office.
- Bernard McLaughlan, Able Seaman Lamptrimmer, Merchant Navy.
- Marion MacLennan, Acting Sub Postmistress, Lochboisdale, Isle of South Uist.
- Elizabeth McMeekin, Forewoman, Imperial Chemical Industries (Explosives) Ltd.
- Alan McPherson, Dock Labourer, Glasgow Dock.
- Donald McPherson, Boatswain, Merchant Navy.
- Neil McTaggart, Boatswain, Merchant Navy.
- Thomas Blackburn Maddison, Acting Foreman, Machine Shop, Darlington, London & North Eastern Railway Company.
- Jean Sarah Malloy, Sergeant-in-charge, Women Police, Glasgow.
- Harold Stocks Marsden, Group Leader, Civil Defence Motor-cycle Messenger Group, Leeds.
- Gordon Percy Albert Marsh, Charge Engineer, Ferry Dock Pumping Station, Dover. For services to Civil Defence.
- Edward John Marsh, Principal Foreman, Royal Aircraft Establishment, Ministry of Aircraft Production.
- John Edward Marsh, Storeman "A", Anti-Aircraft Command, War Office.
- Robert Martin, Chief Baker, Merchant Navy.
- Harry Matcham, Chargeman of Acid Mixers, RN Cordite Factory, Holton Heath.
- Audrey Mather, Librarian and Entertainment Organiser, Catterick. For services to the Forces.
- Horace Melbourne, Chief Cartage Supervisor, Marylebone, London & North Eastern Railway Company. For services to Civil Defence.
- Helen Rae Mellis, Centre Organiser, Women's Voluntary Services for Civil Defence, Clydebank, Dunbartonshire.
- Thomas Inglis Russell Melville, Section-Leader, Western (No. 2) Area, Scotland, National Fire Service.
- Charles Edwin Miles, Foreman, Electrical Assembly and Wiring Shop, Cinema-Television Ltd.
- Albert Reginald Millar, Employed in a Department of the Foreign Office.
- Harry Miller, Inspector (Engineering), Telephone Manager's Office, Lincoln.
- William Henry Miller, Temporary Chief Inspector, Oxford City Police. For services to Civil Defence.
- Dorothy Milne, Canteen Manageress, Royal Ordnance Factory, Ministry of Supply.
- John Mitchell, Chief Warden, Civil Defence Wardens Service, Londonderry.
- Charles William Moller, Works Manager, Plessey Co. Ltd.
- Alfred Molyneux, Able Seaman, Merchant Navy.
- Ernest Monk, Foreman, Royal Gunpowder Factory, Ministry of Supply.
- Thomas Monkhouse, General Foreman, Metropolitan-Vickers Ltd.
- Bernard Moore, Group Inspector, Automotive Products Ltd.
- George Moore, Plater's Helper, Wm. Hamilton & Co. Ltd.
- Thomas Henry Moore, Machine Shop Foreman, Mellor Bromley & Co. Ltd.
- William Moore, Transport Worker (Docker), Immingham.
- Frederick John Morley, Artificer, Admiralty Signal Establishment.
- Edward George Morris, Foreman, Civil Defence Rescue Service, Bethnal Green.
- Winifred Morris, Paste Mixer, Chargehand, Royal Ordnance Factory, Ministry of Supply.
- Trevor Morse, Chargehand Fitter, Royal Ordnance Factory, Ministry of Supply.
- Sidney Charles Moyse, Foreman of Shipping, RN Armament Depot, Priddy's Hard.
- William Alfred Muir, DCM, Storeholder, Gun Ammunition Depot, Ministry of Supply.
- Gordon Stuart Straite Murray, Fireman, No. 37 Fire Area, National Fire Service.
- William Murray, Carpenter, Merchant Navy.
- Robert Henry Mutter, Acting 1st Class Engineer of Yard Craft, HM Naval Base, Pembroke Dock.
- Jack Nash, Docker, Bristol.
- Robert Nattan, Foreman Boilermaker, Penarth Pontoon Slipway & Ship Repairing Co. Ltd.
- Frank Thomas Newell, Boatswain, Merchant Navy.
- Annie Emily Sarah Norris, Foster parent to evacuee children, Maidenhead.
- Albert John Nunn, Honorary Organiser for Methodist and United Churches Board. For services to the Forces.
- James Nutty, Fitter, Grade I, Derby, London, Midland & Scottish Railway Company.
- William George Oldfield, Chargehand, W. T. Henley's Telegraph Works Co. Ltd.
- Frederick William Palmer, Acting Inspector of Storehousemen, HM Naval Victualling Yard, Simonstown.
- Henry Palmer, Plant Engineer, Brett Stamping Co. Ltd.
- Sidney William James Parke, Workshop Superintendent, Borough Polytechnic, London.
- Frederick Parker, General Foreman and Yard Manager, Berthon Boat Co. Ltd.
- Matthew John Parkinson, Chief Steward, Merchant Navy.
- Thomas David Parrett, Cable Laying-Up Machine Driver, Johnson & Phillips Ltd.
- Harry Parsons, Fitter, Helliwell's Tunnel Foundry.
- George Alfred Patrick, Night Supervisor, London Telecommunications Region.
- William J. Patterson, Skipper of a Motor Boat.
- Fred Peace, Chief Gun Hardener, English Steel Corporation Ltd.
- Matthew Frank Peet, Workshop Manager and Acting Assistant I, Admiralty Outstation.
- Frances Marion Penton, Senior Forewoman, Vickers-Armstrongs Ltd.
- James Perla, Chief Steward, Merchant Navy.
- John Henry Petherbridge, Dock Canteen Caterer and Manager, Hull.
- John Henry Philips, Chargeman Brass Finisher, Swan, Hunter & Wigham Richardson Ltd.
- Dan Phillips, Supervising Postman, Cardigan.
- John William Phillips, Head Foreman, Out-erecting Department, R. & W. Hawthorn Leslie & Co. Ltd.
- David Plumbley, Docker, Garston, London, Midland & Scottish Railway Company.
- George Pointer, Driver (Central Buses), London Passenger Transport Board.
- Doris Powell, Skilled Operative, Davies Steel Specialities Ltd.
- William George Powell, Bedroom Steward, Merchant Navy.
- Charles Prince, Chief Steward, Merchant Navy.
- Stephen Quinn, Sub-Foreman, Clutha Stevedoring Company.
- Christina Ratcliffe, Plotter, Operations Room, RAF Headquarters, Malta.
- Luke Reay, Head Foreman Plumber, Silley Cox & Co. Ltd.
- John Henry Reed, Head Foreman, Eastern Electric Service.
- Agnes Dods Revolta, Chief Assistant (Grade I), Seed Testing Station, Department of Agriculture for Scotland.
- Edwin Henry Holland Rhodes, Acting Second Class Draughtsman, Naval Construction Department, Admiralty.
- Christmas William Rice, Able Seaman, Merchant Navy.
- Ralph Rice, Foreman, John White (Impregnable Boots) Ltd.
- Albert Phillip Roberts, Chief Electrical Engineer, Sangamo Weston Ltd.
- Charles Roberts, Skilled Instrument Maker, Ernest F. Moy Ltd.
- James Frederick Robinson, Foreman, Vauxhall Motors Ltd.
- Joseph Robinson, Chargehand, Wellman Smith Owen Engineering Corporation Ltd.
- Percy Goulding Rodgers, lately Warehouseman, Imperial Lighthouse Force, Bahamas.
- James Henry Rogers, Assistant Foreman, Electrical and Mechanical Equipment Inspectorate, Ministry of Supply.
- Gladys Rolfe, Leader, YMCA Services Canteen, Waterloo Station, London.
- Edwin Rowley, Assistant Fire Guard Staff Officer, Finsbury.
- Constance Mary Russell, Officer, Women's Voluntary Services for Civil Defence, Hoylake. For services to the Forces.
- Richard Ruth, MM, Sorting Clerk and Telegraphist, Head Post Office, Bradford.
- Mabel Sadler, Leading Firewoman, No. 34 Fire Area, National Fire Service.
- Irene Salmon, Extrusion Press Driver, Birmetals Ltd.
- George Sanderson, Donkeyman, Merchant Navy.
- Charles William Sawkill, Able Seaman and Lamp Trimmer, Merchant Navy.
- Charles Henry Sayers, Production Engineer, John Farmer & Co. (Leeds) Ltd.
- Thomas Scott, Blacksmith, Royal Ordnance Factory, Ministry of Supply.
- Arthur Reginald Seager, Tinsmith, Metal Box Co. Ltd.
- Harry Selby, Foreman, A. V. Roe & Co. Ltd.
- Florence Sophia Sewell, Supervisor, London Telecommunications Region.
- William Thomas Edwin Sheppard, Engineer Draughtsman, British Industrial Solvents Ltd.
- Leonard Shipley, Foreman, Elder Dempster Lines Ltd.
- William John Shute, Depot Manager, House Coal Distribution (Emergency) Scheme, Brixham.
- George Simms, Manager of Church of England Institutes. For sendees to the Forces.
- Andrew Simpson, Head Foreman Shipwright, Burntisland Shipbuilding Co. Ltd.
- James Sinclair, Able Seaman, Merchant Navy.
- Henry Charles Sitters, Acting Foreman of the Yard, HM Dockyard, Devonport.
- William John Stanley Slade, Acting First Class Draughtsman, Admiralty.
- Alfred George Smith, Established 1st Class Master of Yard Craft, HM Dockyard, Gibraltar.
- George Herbert Smith, Foreman Electrician, Richard Pickersgill & Sons.
- William Smith, Permanent Chargeman of Labourers, HM Dockyard, Chatham.
- William Henry Smith, Established Storehouseman, HM Naval Victualling Depot, Jamestown, Dumbartonshire.
- Hugh Smyth, Boatswain, Merchant Navy.
- Tulaiman X. Sk. Sobrathi, Deck Serang, Merchant Navy.
- Charles Henry Standen, Meteorological Assistant, Grade III, Air Ministry Outstation.
- James Starrett, Head Ropemaker, Gourock Rope Works Ltd.
- Arthur Barralet Stockwell, Chief of Test, A. C. Cossor Ltd.
- Ernest Norley Stooke, Acting Foreman of Electrical Branch, HM Dockyard, Devonport.
- Charles Alfred Stradling, Assistant Superintendent, London Branches, Cable & Wireless Ltd.
- Herbert Charles William Street, Warden, Civil Defence Wardens Service, Southampton.
- William Sutcliff, Cook Steward, Merchant Navy.
- George Melville Sutherland, MM, Observer, Royal Observer Corps.
- Harry Sutherland, Able Seaman, Merchant Navy.
- Marjorie Deane Sweeting, Leader-in-Charge, YWCA, Donnington.
- William John Swene, Station Leader, Civil Defence First Aid Party Service, Smethwick.
- Ronald Bass Tabb, Acting Inspector of Storehousemen, HM Naval Base, Durban.
- William Tait, Donkeyman, Merchant Navy.
- Gertrude Olive Taylor, Machinist, Black & Decker Ltd.
- Ralph Taylor, Inspector of Postmen, Slough.
- Robert William Taylor, Setter, Grade "B" (Working Chargehand), Royal Ordnance Factory, Ministry of Supply.
- William Ridley Teasdale, Instructor, London Training School, Cable & Wireless Ltd.
- Phan Chue Tei, Quartermaster, Merchant Navy.
- Walter Henry Thompson, Inspector, Metropolitan Police Force.
- Frederick James Thorn, Established Chargeman of Joiners, RN Armament Depot, Bull Point.
- George Stephen Tingle, Foreman of Joiners, Naval Ordnance Department, Admiralty.
- Thomas Tonks, Foreman Electrician, Fisher & Ludlow Ltd.
- Jane Anne Turnbull, Senior Overlooker, Royal Ordnance Factory, Ministry of Supply.
- Gwladys Muriel Helen Turner, Assistant to Area Organiser, No. 7 (Taunton) Area, Civil Defence Service.
- Florence May Twycross, Leader, Ambulance Station, Civil Defence Ambulance Service, Smethwick.
- Phyllis May Tyson, Billeting Officer, Colyton.
- William John Udall, Painter, Merchant Navy.
- Ahmed Ullah X. Abdar Ullah, Engineroom Serang, Merchant Navy.
- Ernest Francis Vallis, Civilian Wireless Operator Mechanic, Army Co-operation Command, Air Ministry.
- Walter Vaughan, Chargehand Caster, Imperial Chemical Industries Metals Ltd.
- Frederick Vernon Vickers, Section Foreman, R. Lloyd & Co. Ltd.
- Reginald Thomas Vine, Assistant Works Manager, Groves & Guttridge Ltd.
- William Walker, Foreman, Joseph Cockshoot & Co. Ltd.
- Charles David Ward, Assistant Steward, Merchant Navy.
- Thomas Ward, Skilled Fitter, Rootes Securities Ltd. (Airframe Factory).
- Elizabeth Warner, Surface Grinding Machine Operator, Alfred Herbert Ltd.
- Robert James Waiters, Bricklayer and Labourer, Charles Connell & Co. Ltd.
- Albert Edward George Webb, Foreman, Detonator Section, Royal Ordnance Factory, Ministry of Supply.
- Enos Webb, Assistant Superintendent, Hanley Branch Post Office, Stoke-on-Trent.
- Isaac Webb, Managing Foreman, George Brough.
- George William Webster, Senior Warden, Civil Defence Wardens Service, County Borough of Smethwick.
- Albert Edward Wells, Radiographic Assistant, London Factory, General Post Office.
- Albert Edward Wells, Chief Steward, Merchant Navy.
- Ethel Gertrude Wheeler, Voluntary Worker in the Welfare Department of the Methodist and United Churches Board. For services to the Forces.
- Charles William Whitaker, Senior Modeller, Naval Construction Department, Admiralty.
- Joseph William White, Boatswain, Merchant Navy.
- Ruth White, Manageress, Navy, Army and Air Force Institute, Stradishall.
- Frederick Thomas Whitehouse, Inspector, B.S.A. Guns Ltd.
- William Charles Wickenden, Laboratory Mechanic, Anti-Submarine Experimental Establishment, Admiralty.
- Robert Wignall, Electrician, Royal Ordnance Factory, Ministry of Supply.
- Samuel Wild, Machine Shop Foreman, Rover Co. Ltd.
- Alfred Joseph Wilkins, Permanent Labourer, Port of London Authority, Royal Victoria Docks.
- Lawrence Wilkinson, Setter-up, Howard & Bullough (Securities) Ltd.
- Andrew Glen Williams, Foreman, Test Department, G. & J. Weir Ltd.
- Robert Wilson, Foreman Turner, Engine Works, Wm. Doxford & Sons Ltd.
- Thomas Wilson, Chief Steward, Merchant Navy.
- Arthur William Wiltshire, Chief Steward, Merchant Navy.
- Edward Winstone, Aero-engine Mechanic, Bristol Aeroplane Company.
- Arthur George Wood, Machine Shop Manager, Gillette Industries Ltd.
- John Wood, Donkeyman, Merchant Navy.
- Silas James Wood, Chargehand Aircraft Fitter, Associated Airways Group.
- William Wood, Assistant Yard Manager, Bartram & Sons Ltd.
- Amy Wright, Supervising Sorting Clerk and Telegraphist, Head Post Office, Melton Mowbray.
- Charles James Wright, Die Turner, Deritend Stamping Co. Ltd.
- William Wright, Storekeeper, Merchant Navy.

Foreign Services

- Charles Claud Hollick, Wagon Shop Foreman, Iraqi State Railways.
- Kamyangi Ababa, Prison Officer, Juba.
- Khalifa Adam, Cash-Checker, Finance Department, Sudan Government.
- Ahmed Effendi Bakheit, Medical Assistant, Sudan Medical Service.
- Mohammed Ahmed Metwalli, lately Chargeman Mechanic, Posts and Telegraphs Department, Sudan Government.

India

- Francis James Cyril Andrews, Manager, Special Branch, Criminal Investigation Department, Madras.
- Indra Kumar Dutta, Head Clerk, Office of the Deputy Commissioner, Naga Hills, Kohima, Assam.
- Mahboob Khan, Assistant Foreman, Inspectorate of Small Arms, Ishapore.
- Har Narain Kulshreshtha, Tahsildar, Agra, United Provinces.
- Norman Henry Pullen, Foreman, General Workshops, Rawalpindi Arsenal.
- Maulvi Mohammed Majibur Rahman, Taluk Officer, Malkangiri, Koraput, Orissa.
- Subedar Ghulam Rasul, Waraspun Bhittanni, Malik and Subedar of Khassadars, Waziristan, North-West Frontier Province.
- Ernest William Rodrigues, Deputy Assistant Engineer, Telephones, Patna Division.
- Charles Hamilton Samida, Assistant Foreman, Inspectorate of Military Carriages, Jubbulpore.
- Narain Singh, Warrant Officer, Faridkot Militia, Faridkot State.

Colonies, Protectorates, Etc.

- Geoffrey Henry Kuper, Native Medical Practitioner, British Solomon Islands Protectorate.
- John Peter Powell, Firemaster, Nairobi Municipal Council, Kenya.
- John Cassar, Chief Engineer, Communal Feeding Department, Malta.
- Vincent Grech, Wardmaster, Leprosy Hospital, Malta.
- Lutfi Awwadh, Wakil, Arab Legion, Trans-Jordan.
- Teophile Balian, Machine Shop Chargeman, Palestine Railways.
- Fanny Khamis, Senior Staff Nurse, Nablus Hospital, Palestine.
- Constantino Papadopoulos, Clerk, Government Printing Office, Palestine.
- Attiya Tantawi, District Mechanic, Public Works Department, Palestine.
- John Rodney Land, Superintendent of Telegraphs and Telephones, Tonga, Western Pacific.

=== Royal Navy ===
The King has been graciously pleased to approve the following Awards for gallantry or outstanding service in the face of the Enemy, or for zeal, patience and cheerfulness in dangerous waters, and for setting an example of wholehearted devotion to duty, without which the high tradition of the Royal Navy could not have been upheld. The Appointments and Awards are for gallantry or good services in the last six months or more of War in His Majesty's Battleships, Battle Cruisers, Aircraft Carriers, Cruisers, Auxiliary Cruisers, Destroyers, Submarines, Minelayers, Corvettes, Sloops, Escort Vessels, Armed Boarding Vessels, Minesweepers, Trawlers, Drifters, Yachts, Anti-Submarine Vessels, Tugs, Motor Gun Boats, Motor Torpedo Boats, Motor Launches, Patrol Ships, Naval Aircraft, Base Ships, Defensively Equipped Merchant Ships and Naval Establishments ashore.

==== Distinguished Service Order (DSO) ====
- Captain Lachlan Donald Mackintosh, DSC.
- Captain Anthony Follett Pugsley.
- Commander Ben James Fisher.
- Temporary Lieutenant William Charles Tinnoth Weekes, Royal Naval Volunteer Reserve.

==== Distinguished Service Cross (DSC) ====
- Commander (Acting Captain) Guy Bouchier Sayer.
- Commander Norman Angell Kyrle Money, OBE, (Retd.).
- Acting Commander Gerald Joel Scott.
- Commander Geoffrey Thomas Blake, RD, Royal Naval Reserve (Retd.).
- Acting Commander George Walter Alexander Thomas Irvine, Royal Naval Reserve (Retd.).
- Acting Commander Joseph Philip Makepeace, RD, Royal Naval Reserve (Retd.).
- Surgeon Commander Jack Leonard Sagar Coulter, MRCS, LRCP.
- Lieutenant-Commander Evelyn Henry Chavasse.
- Lieutenant-Commander Andrew Edward Doran.
- Lieutenant-Commander Horace Wellesley Firth.
- Lieutenant-Commander John Charles Anthony Ingram.
- Lieutenant-Commander (Acting Commander) Henry Ian Glazebrook Rylands.
- Lieutenant-Commander George Victor Legassick, Royal Naval Reserve.
- Lieutenant-Commander John Montague Lycett, Royal Naval Reserve.
- Acting Temporary Lieutenant-Commander George Howard Garrard, Royal Naval Volunteer Reserve.
- Acting Temporary Lieutenant-Commander Eric John Strowlger, Royal Naval Volunteer Reserve.
- Acting Temporary Lieutenant-Commander Robert Turner, Royal Naval Volunteer Reserve.
- Lieutenant-Commander (E) Francis Armishaw Lowe.
- Acting Temporary Lieutenant-Commander (E) Joseph Usher.
- Lieutenant Wilfred Reginald Muttram.
- Lieutenant Harold Geeves Chesterman, Royal Naval Reserve.
- Lieutenant Patrick Varwell Collings, Royal Naval Reserve.
- Lieutenant John Samuel Gordon-Christian, Royal Naval Reserve.
- Lieutenant Philip Bernard Moore, Royal Naval Reserve.
- Lieutenant Leonard Arthur White, Royal Naval Reserve.
- Lieutenant Gerald Peter Shiers Lowe, Royal Naval Volunteer Reserve.
- Lieutenant John Rowlands Pritchard, Royal Naval Volunteer Reserve.
- Temporary Lieutenant Robert Wilson Ellis, Royal Naval Reserve.
- Temporary Lieutenant Jack D'Arcy Hoffman, Royal Naval Volunteer Reserve.
- Temporary Lieutenant Donald Wilcock Holgate, Royal Naval Volunteer Reserve.
- Temporary Lieutenant Desmond Roberts Hopking, Royal Naval Volunteer Reserve.
- Temporary Lieutenant Norman John Ivison, Royal Naval Volunteer Reserve.
- Temporary Lieutenant Charles James Jerram, Royal Naval Volunteer Reserve.
- Temporary Lieutenant Murdock Malcolm Mackenzie, Royal Naval Volunteer Reserve.
- Temporary Lieutenant James Rintoul Smellie, Royal Naval Volunteer Reserve.
- Temporary Lieutenant Eric James Stanley Smith, Royal Naval Volunteer Reserve.
- Lieutenant (E) William Elijah Chick.
- Lieutenant (E) Ramsey Richard Lambert.
- Lieutenant (E) Henry Edward Benning Williamson.
- Temporary Lieutenant (E) Frank Smith, Royal Naval Reserve.
- Temporary Surgeon Lieutenant James Greer Campbell Murray, MB, BCh, Royal Naval Volunteer Reserve.
- Paymaster Lieutenant Peter John Dowdeswell.
- Sub-Lieutenant John Greig Wilson, Royal Naval Reserve.
- Acting Skipper Lieutenant William Alexander Cormack, 2857W.S., Royal Naval Reserve.
- Acting Skipper Lieutenant William Richard Alward Hicks, 2799W.S., Royal Naval Reserve.
- Acting Skipper Lieutenant William Eric Patterson, 2974W.S., Royal Naval Reserve.
- Acting Temporary Skipper Lieutenant William Reginald Watson, 167T.S., Royal Naval Reserve.
- Mr. John Mawer Larder, Commissioned Gunner.
- Skipper Daniel Edward Coleman, 3561W.S., Royal Naval Reserve.
- Temporary Skipper Alexander Smith Dorward, 415T.S., Royal Naval Reserve.
- Temporary Skipper Alfred Ernest Kettless, 322T.S., Royal Naval Reserve.
- Mr. William Henry Hobbs, Commissioned Shipwright.
- Mr. Ernest Edward Pryce Jones, Commissioned Engineer.
- Mr. Charles Alexander Maxwell, Commissioned Engineer.
- Mr. Oscar Samuel Taylor Slope, Commissioned Engineer.
- Mr. George Cook, Gunner (T).
- Mr. Arthur William John Stacey, Gunner (T).
- Mr. Kenneth Hugh Reginald Thresh, Gunner.
- Mr. William John Gray, Temporary Gunner (T).
- Mr. Charles William Ruse, Warrant Engineer.
- Mr. George Robert Campbell Berry, Temporary Warrant Engineer.
- Mr. William Edwin Drew Cater, Temporary Warrant Engineer.
- Mr. Charles Robert Berry, Acting Warrant Ordnance Officer.

==== Distinguished Service Medal (DSM) ====
- Chief Petty Officer Stephen Augustus Cripps, P/J.17657.
- Chief Petty Officer Harry Wallace Docwra, C/JX.125035.
- Chief Petty Officer Henry George Gill, C/J.38571.
- Chief Petty Officer Mark Stephen Springett, C/JX.163378.
- Chief Petty Officer John Tether, C/J.43615.
- Chief Petty Officer Wilfred James Cooper Tull, P/J.103761.
- Acting Chief Petty Officer William Hornby Cook, D/J.105792.
- Chief Yeoman of Signals Frederick Samuel Victor Heath, C/J.14330.
- Chief Yeoman of Signals Thomas George Kinch, D/JX.129496.
- Chief Yeoman of Signals Reginald Bryan Mills, D/J.18120.
- Chief Yeoman of Signals Walter Hill Paul, D/J.79445.
- Chief Yeoman of Signals Herbert Morgan Thomas, D/J.5797.
- Chief Petty Officer Telegraphist Cyril Robert Bannister, P/JX.159222.
- Chief Petty Officer Telegraphist John Charles Colyer, C/J.14186.
- Chief Petty Officer Telegraphist Michael Fitzgerald, D/J.54901.
- Chief Petty Officer Telegraphist Edwin William Manley, C/J.87191.
- Chief Engine Room Artificer Robert Bromhead, C/M.39440.
- Chief Engine Room Artificer James Clark, C/M.37902.
- Chief Engine Room Artificer Samuel Edwin Cleall, P/MX.46622.
- Chief Engine Room Artificer Alfred Robert Gray, C/M.31392.
- Chief Engine Room Artificer Herbert Leslie Jervis, D/M.24893.
- Chief Engine Room Artificer Ronald James Ashton Lamberth, D/MX.49133.
- Chief Engine Room Artificer John Laving, C/M.5575.
- Chief Engine Room Artificer Ezra Wilson Meadows, C/M.29027.
- Chief Engine Room Artificer Cecil Leslie Maurice Shepperd, C/M.37906.
- Chief Engine Room Artificer Donald Kenneth Smith, C/MX.49230.
- Master-at-Arms Charles Greenslade, D.238061.
- Chief Stoker Frank Clifford Caeils, D/K.77675.
- Chief Stoker Ernest Horton, D/K.66843.
- Chief Stoker William Charles Lawrence, C/K.52132.
- Chief Stoker Sidney Melbourne Floyde Veal, D/KX.75589.
- Chief Electrical Artificer John Clarence Jordan, C/MX.47422.
- Chief Engineman John Croft Clapp, LT/X.6126, Royal Naval Reserve.
- Chief Engineman Thomas William Hipkin, LT/KX.103345, Royal Naval Patrol Service.
- Chief Engineman John Edward Holmes, LT/KX.112702, Royal Naval Patrol Service.
- Chief Engineman Frank Ironmonger, LT/X.341/E.T., Royal Naval Reserve.
- Chief Engineman Robert Lamb, LT/KX.115441, Royal Naval Patrol Service.
- Chief Engineman William Morrison, LT/317EU, Royal Naval Reserve.
- Acting Chief Engineman William McIntosh, LT/KX.101802, Royal Naval Patrol Service.
- Acting Chief Engineman Theophilus Smith, LT/KX.114677, Royal Naval Patrol Service.
- Acting Chief Petty Officer Motor Mechanic Percy William Maxwell, C/MX.76181.
- Second Hand Charles William Scales, LT/JX.205337, Royal Naval Patrol Service.
- Second Hand Alexander Garden Stewart, LT/JX.265238, Royal Naval Patrol Service.
- Colour Sergeant William Francis Foster, Ply.22368, Royal Marines.
- Engine Room Artificer Second Class Wilfrid George Chaffe, D/MX.5O272.
- Ordnance Artificer Third Class Aubrey James John Cutler, P/MX.55852.
- Ordnance Artificer Third Class Frank Goodridge, D/MX.48588.
- Ordnance Artificer Fourth Class Arthur Rogerson, D/MX.61097.
- Air Artificer Fourth Class Arthur Ralph Rapley, FAA/FX.75101.
- Petty Officer Richard Joseph Brangan, D/JX.128905.
- Petty Officer Cornelius Frederick Checklin, P/J.92208.
- Petty Officer John Edmund Church, D/JX.130859.
- Petty Officer Robert Clark, C/JX.130955.
- Petty Officer John Frederick Cooke, D/JX.139464.
- Petty Officer Clement William Roger Eisner, P/JX.332885.
- Petty Officer George William Edgar Fagg, C/J.113497.
- Petty Officer John Thomas Hicks, LT/JX.206557, Royal Naval Patrol Service.
- Petty Officer James Ernest Ironmonger, C/J.110034.
- Petty Officer William Mills, C/JX.129849.
- Petty Officer Victor Gilbert Plunkett, C/J.115352.
- Petty Officer Charles Edward Thomas Poole, P/J.103898.
- Temporary Petty Officer George James Plant, D/JX.136703.
- Temporary Acting Petty Officer Derrick John Brazier, C/LDX.4979.
- Temporary Acting Petty Officer Frederick Joseph Chatfield, C/JX.134078.
- Temporary Acting Petty Officer Eric David Cheers, D/MDX.3077.
- Temporary Acting Petty Officer Harold Watkins, D/MDX.2089.
- Yeoman of Signals Currie William Beattie Minick, D/JX.133270.
- Yeoman of Signals Leonard Aylwin Rose, P/JX.149313.
- Temporary Yeoman of Signals Alfred George Wiggins, D/J.30127.
- Petty Officer Telegraphist Frederick Millward Elliott, P/JX.138645.
- Petty Officer Telegraphist Lawrence Edwin Hall, C/SSX.13938.
- Petty Officer Telegraphist William Arthur Rayner, C/JX.133884.
- Petty Officer Telegraphist Ernest George Taylor, D/JX.151003.
- Petty Officer Telegraphist Charles Frederick Thompson, D/JX.140228.
- Stoker Petty Officer Arthur Ernest Walter Glazier, P/K.65842.
- Stoker Petty Officer Albert Leslie Greenfield, P/KX.78285.
- Petty Officer Cook William Sainsbury, P/M.35435.
- Engineman Charles Nisbet Geddes, LT/KX.114635, Royal Naval Patrol Service.
- Engineman Alfred Edward Hipkin, LT/KX.112843, Royal Naval Patrol Service.
- Engineman Sidney Leonard Sanders, LT/KX.101240, Royal Naval Patrol Service.
- Petty Officer Air Mechanic (A) Allan Hamilton Gray, D/X.9467B, Royal Naval Reserve.
- Sergeant (Temporary) Arthur Robert Claydon, Po.X.1815, Royal Marines.
- Acting Temporary Sergeant Hubert Jones, Ply.17560, Royal Marines.
- Acting Temporary Sergeant Frederick Harry Morgan, Po.22526, Royal Marines.
- Acting Temporary Sergeant George Edgar Clemence Newton, Po.216882, Royal Marines.
- Acting Temporary Sergeant Walter William Power, Po.213567, Royal Marines.
- Acting Temporary Sergeant Frederick Robert Tomsett, Ch.24411, Royal Marines.
- Acting Temporary Sergeant Albert Edward Webb, Po.216171, Royal Marines.
- Acting Temporary Sergeant Albert Edward Wall, Ch.X.24849, Royal Marines.
- Acting Temporary Sergeant Albert George Williams, Po.22097, Royal Marines.
- Acting Temporary Sergeant Alfred Martin Ward, Po.214494, Royal Marines.
- Acting Temporary Sergeant Reginald St. John Woodcock, Ch.24862, Royal Marines.
- Leading Seaman Herbert Baker, C/J.115012.
- Leading Seaman William John James Bugden, LT/JX.198755, Royal Naval Patrol Service.
- Leading Seaman William Dale, LT/JX.220750, Royal Naval Patrol Service.
- Leading Seaman Alister Donaldson, LT/JX.177041, Royal Naval Patrol Service.
- Leading Seaman Leslie Albert Petter, D/JX.127061.
- Leading Seaman William Henry Slater, P/JX.175643.
- Leading Seaman Alexander Powie Wood, LT/JX.193916, Royal Naval Patrol Service.
- Acting Leading Seaman Frederick James Wood, P/JX.164830.
- Temporary Acting Leading Seaman Thomas Henry Hawkins, P/SSX.18726.
- Temporary Acting Leading Seaman William Duncan Chisholm, C/JX.176706.
- Temporary Leading Airman John Worsley Green, FAA/FX.87221.
- Convoy Leading Signalman William Edward John Holm, C/JX.182814.
- Leading Signalman John William Smith, P/JX.132615.
- Leading Wireless Mechanic George Wilfrid Bucanan Wells, C/MX.93317.
- Leading Wireman Charles Henry Fuller, C/MX.77713.
- Leading Cook Arthur John Jennings, LT/MX.83581.
- Able Seaman Horace William Foulds, P/JX.289399.
- Able Seaman John Philip Pipe, P/J.29519.
- Able Seaman Percy William Sprigings, C/JX.129869.
- Signalman Charles Mew, LD/X.4045, Royal Naval Volunteer Reserve.
- Telegraphist William Henry Allan, P/JX.169758.
- Telegraphist Laurence Lightwood, C/WRX.125.
- Telegraphist Sydney John Thorogood, C/JX.211151.
- Stoker First Class Hancock William Gibbs, D/KX.121534.
- Stoker First Class Samuel Parry, LT/KX.109475, Royal Naval Patrol Service.
- Stoker Raymond Eric Ralph, LT/KX.136589, Royal Naval Patrol Service.
- Corporal George Henry Burt, 618331, Royal Air Force.
- Corporal Daniel O'Sullivan, 533494, Royal Air Force.
- Ordinary Signalman John Sydney Smith, D/JX.246958.
- Seaman Leonard Biggin, LT/JX.265194, Royal Naval Patrol Service.
- Seaman John Dorran, LT/JX.207450, Royal Naval Patrol Service.
- Seaman Frederick Richard Jenkins, LT/JX.203688, Royal Naval Patrol Service.
- Seaman Thomas Edward Lewis, LT/JX.200786.
- Corporal (Temporary) Richard Paris, Po.X.56, Royal Marines.
- Band Corporal William Frank Seymour, R.M.B.X.385.
- Acting Temporary Corporal George William Henry Smith, Po.215476, Royal Marines.

==== Mention in Despatches ====
- Group Captain Robert Good Forbes, Royal Air Force.
- Commander Edward Hale.
- Commander Hugh May Stollery Mundy.
- Commander Hugh Crofton Simms, DSO.
- Commander Geoffrey Mainwaring Sladen, DSO, DSC.
- Commander Ralph Geoffrey Swallow.
- Commander Peter Keith Wallace, (Retd.).
- Acting Commander Thomas Taylor, DSC.
- Acting Commander Frederick Alfred George Hunter, RD, Royal Naval Reserve (Retd.).
- Acting Commander Harold Edward Morison, RD, Royal Naval Reserve (Retd.).
- Commander (E) Peter Kenneth Llewellyn Fry.
- Commander (E) Hubert Cecil George Griffin.
- Commander (E) Edward James Parish, DSO.
- Commander (E) Robert William Parker.
- Commander (E) John Geoffrey Taite.
- Paymaster Commander George Deering Selwood.
- Lieutenant-Commander Anthony Charles Akerman, DSC.
- Lieutenant-Commander Norris Edwin Cutler.
- Lieutenant-Commander Walter Elliot.
- Lieutenant-Commander Richard Alan Vere Gregory.
- Lieutenant-Commander Maurice Linton Hardie.
- Lieutenant-Commander Richard Everard Hardman-Jones.
- Lieutenant-Commander Leslie Beara Miller.
- Lieutenant-Commander Robert John Pipon Montgomery.
- Lieutenant-Commander Henry Alexander Stuart-Menteth.
- Lieutenant-Commander Frank Archibald Cleale Bishop, Royal Naval Reserve (Retd.).
- Lieutenant-Commander Arthur Edward Coles, RD, Royal Naval Reserve.
- Lieutenant-Commander John Treasure Jones, RD, Royal Naval Reserve.
- Lieutenant-Commander Maurice George Rose, Royal Australian Naval Volunteer Reserve.
- Acting Temporary Lieutenant-Commander Ernest Robert Dalby, Royal Naval Reserve.
- Acting Temporary Lieutenant-Commander Adrian Charles Cuthbert Seligman, Royal Naval Reserve.
- Acting Lieutenant-Commander Albert Wesley Anderson, Royal Naval Volunteer Reserve.
- Temporary Acting Lieutenant-Commander Frank Gilbert Darnborough, Royal Naval Volunteer Reserve.
- Temporary Acting Lieutenant-Commander Charles Patrick Hamilton-Adams, Royal Naval Volunteer Reserve.
- Temporary Lieutenant-Commander (E) Charles Austen-Hofer, Royal Naval Reserve.
- Acting Temporary Lieutenant-Commander Cecil Arthur Jeff, Royal Naval Volunteer Reserve.
- Temporary Lieutenant-Commander (E) William Ogg Stephen, Royal Naval Reserve.
- Temporary Acting Lieutenant-Commander (E) Charles Taylor.
- Paymaster Lieutenant-Commander (Acting Paymaster Commander) Jack Raymond Haysom.
- Instructor Lieutenant-Commander John Cleland Gascoigne, BSc.
- Lieutenant Barry John Anderson.
- Lieutenant Peter John Cardale.
- Lieutenant Alexander Henderson Diack, DSC.
- Lieutenant Henry Dumaresq Durell.
- Lieutenant (Acting Lieutenant-Commander) Robert Norman Everett.
- Lieutenant John Jardine Gresson.
- Lieutenant Anthony Templer Frederick Griffith Griffin.
- Lieutenant Patrick Durrant Hoare.
- Lieutenant Joseph Harry Mitton.
- Lieutenant George Walter Morgan.
- Lieutenant Lester Allan Pepperell.
- Lieutenant Alan Phipps.
- Lieutenant Hubert Duncan McLauchlan Slater.
- Lieutenant George Leopold Smith.
- Lieutenant Clifford Wittenham Squires.
- Lieutenant Thomas Heanley White.
- Lieutenant Kenneth Arthur Gadd, DSC, Royal Naval Reserve.
- Lieutenant Alan Leonard Gustav Gillies, Royal Naval Reserve.
- Lieutenant John Andrew Pearson, DSC, Royal Naval Reserve.
- Lieutenant William Edward Quirk, Royal Naval Reserve.
- Temporary Lieutenant John Ernest Stanhope Meade, Royal Naval Reserve.
- Acting Temporary Lieutenant Frederick William Gilroy, Royal Naval Reserve.
- Lieutenant John David Archer, Royal Naval Volunteer Reserve.
- Temporary Lieutenant Ernest Edwin Davis, Royal Naval Volunteer Reserve.
- Temporary Lieutenant Charles Howard Pearse, Royal Naval Volunteer Reserve.
- Temporary Lieutenant Frederick Norman Salisbury, Royal Naval Volunteer Reserve.
- Temporary Lieutenant Owen Selborne Boome, Royal Naval Volunteer Reserve.
- Temporary Lieutenant Eric Tolson Garside, Royal Naval Volunteer Reserve.
- Temporary Lieutenant Maurice William Hampson, Royal Naval Volunteer Reserve.
- Temporary Lieutenant Ronald Edward Hawker, Royal Naval Volunteer Reserve.
- Temporary Lieutenant John Francis Johns, Royal Naval Volunteer Reserve.
- Temporary Lieutenant Edward Kerfoot Jones, Royal Naval Volunteer Reserve.
- Temporary Lieutenant Philip Geoffrey Colet King, Royal Naval Volunteer Reserve.
- Temporary Lieutenant Edmund James Charles Lines, Royal Naval Volunteer Reserve.
- Temporary Lieutenant Reginald Frederick James Maberley, Royal Naval Volunteer Reserve.
- Temporary Lieutenant Norman Emmanuel Mitchell, Royal Naval Volunteer Reserve.
- Temporary Lieutenant Nicholas John Turney Monsarrat, Royal Naval Volunteer Reserve.
- Temporary Lieutenant John Provost Perkins, Royal Naval Volunteer Reserve.
- Temporary Lieutenant George Stanley Peyton, Royal Naval Volunteer Reserve.
- Lieutenant William Brown Watson, Royal Naval Volunteer Reserve.
- Lieutenant Ronald James Crankshaw, South African Naval Forces (Volunteer).
- Lieutenant Trevor Owen Kolts, Royal Australian Naval Volunteer Reserve.
- Captain John Richards, Royal Marines.
- Lieutenant (E) Thomas Henry Butlin.
- Lieutenant (E) John Richard Seear.
- Lieutenant (E) John Kenyon Pearsall.
- Temporary Lieutenant Commander (E) George Frederick Shields, Royal Naval Reserve.
- Temporary Surgeon Lieutenant Robert Stewart Slessor, MB, BCh, Royal Naval Volunteer Reserve.
- Paymaster Lieutenant Frederick George Bell, Royal Naval Volunteer Reserve.
- Temporary Electrical Lieutenant Leonard Norman Blackburn-Maze, Royal Naval Volunteer Reserve.
- Skipper Lieutenant George Stewart, 2608W.S., Royal Naval Reserve.
- Acting Temporary Skipper Lieutenant Robert Boreas Walter Hume, 196T.S., Royal Naval Reserve.
- Acting Skipper Lieutenant Walter Kirman, 2867W.S., Royal Naval Reserve.
- Acting Skipper Lieutenant Gunnar Lie Olesen, 2887W.S., Royal Naval Reserve.
- Acting Temporary Skipper Lieutenant John Richard Corlett Reader, 191T.S., Royal Naval Reserve.
- Skipper Herbert Charles Bidle, 3486W.S., Royal Naval Reserve.
- Skipper George Henry Loades, 2978W.S., Royal Naval Reserve.
- Temporary Skipper John Harris James, 143T.S., Royal Naval Reserve.
- Temporary Skipper Donald Miller, 192T.S., Royal Naval Reserve.
- Temporary Skipper William John Tiller, 438T.S., Royal Naval Reserve.
- Sub-Lieutenant Robin Alfred Charles Owen.
- Temporary Sub-Lieutenant Frederick William Hill, Royal Naval Volunteer Reserve.
- Temporary Sub-Lieutenant Ronald George Redgwell, Royal Naval Volunteer Reserve.
- Temporary Sub-Lieutenant (E) Cecil Alexander Duke, Royal Naval Reserve.
- Sub-Lieutenant (E) Archibald Hosie, Royal Naval Volunteer Reserve.
- Temporary Engineer Sub-Lieutenant John Williamson Pirrett, Royal Australian Naval Reserve (Seagoing).
- Temporary Sub-Lieutenant (E) William McKenzie, Royal Naval Volunteer Reserve.
- Mr. Richard Roberts Frederick Liddall, Commissioned Gunner.
- Mr. Herbert Thomas Carter, Commissioned Engineer.
- Mr. William Comstock, Commissioned Engineer.
- Mr. Henry Edward Mason, Commissioned Engineer.
- Mr. Thomas Coleridge Lee, Commissioned Engineer.
- Mr. Alan William Munns, Commissioned Engineer.
- Mr. Sydney Arthur Nash, Commissioned Engineer.
- Mr. Walter Henry Paris Sellers, Commissioned Engineer.
- Mr. Malcolm James Louis Randell, Commissioned Engineer.
- Mr. Andrew Wilkinson, Commissioned Engineer.
- Mr. George Covey, Gunner (T).
- Mr. Philip Dodson, Gunner.
- Mr. Harry Thomas Bridle, Temporary Gunner.
- Mr. William John Golley, Temporary Acting Gunner.
- Mr. Charles Frederick Cleary, Warrant Engineer.
- Mr. Harold Arthur Jackson, Warrant Engineer.
- Mr. William Morris Jones, Warrant Engineer.
- Mr. Lionel Arthur Paine, Warrant Engineer.
- Mr. John Robert Mulholland, Acting Warrant Engineer.
- Mr. Horace Varley, Temporary Warrant Engineer.
- Mr. Sydney Arthur Wilkins, Temporary Acting Warrant Engineer.
- Mr. Frederick Thomas Low, Warrant Telegraphist.
- Mr. Thomas James Bush, Warrant Shipwright.
- Mr. Albert Hunter, Warrant Shipwright.
- Mr. Percy Roy Butler, Warrant Shipwright.
- Mr. George Michael Sopp, Warrant Shipwright.
- Mr. Gwyn Protheroe, Warrant Supply Officer.
- Mr. Samuel Thomas Barber, Temporary Warrant Supply Officer.
- Mr. Charles Leonard Gowers, Acting Warrant Cook.
- Chief Petty Officer John Charles Arnold, D/J.102514.
- Chief Petty Officer Charles Henry Bull, D/J.108336.
- Chief Petty Officer Joseph Chamberlain, C/JX.129747.
- Chief Petty Officer Frederick Charles Flux, DSM, P/J.113384.
- Chief Petty Officer Eric A'Court Fuller, D/J.98526.
- Chief Petty Officer Arthur William Fuller, C/J.104858.
- Chief Petty Officer Donald George Haffenden, P/J.24789.
- Chief Petty Officer William Alfred Jarnet, D/J.85606.
- Chief Petty Officer William George Lee, D/J.45661.
- Chief Petty Officer Arthur William Miller, C/J.104858.
- Chief Petty Officer Albert James Newland, P/JX.107204.
- Chief Petty Officer Arthur Edward Norris, C/J.114161.
- Chief Petty Officer Charles Frederick Ratcliff, C/J.104195.
- Chief Petty Officer Alfred Stagg, C/J.15825.
- Chief Petty Officer George William White, C/J.89862.
- Chief Petty Officer Frank Reginald Wills, D/J.96305.
- Temporary Chief Petty Officer Charles Herbert Morley, D/J.106278.
- Acting Chief Petty Officer Harold William Pethick, D/J.95377.
- Acting Chief Petty Officer Frederick George Brooks, C/J.103947.
- Acting Chief Petty Officer Frederick John Studd, C/JX.126350.
- Chief Yeoman of Signals Bertram Donald Reed, C/J.50185.
- Chief Yeoman of Signals George Philip Smith, P/J.103066.
- Chief Yeoman of Signals Richard Reuben Wallbank, C/JX.129246.
- Chief Petty Officer Telegraphist William Henry Bromley, D/J.43934.
- Chief Petty Officer Telegraphist Walter Jeffery, D/J.35757.
- Chief Petty Officer Telegraphist Frank Holland, C/J.102670.
- Chief Petty Officer Telegraphist Gilbert McCulloch, C/JX.130902.
- Chief Petty Officer Telegraphist Donald George Saunders, C/JX.128526.
- Chief Engine Room Artificer Alfred John Atlee, C/M.39393.
- Chief Engine Room Artificer Leslie Harry Blacker, D/M.269O8.
- Chief Engine Room Artificer William Alexander Burden, BEM, C/M.38758.
- Chief Engine Room Artificer Second Class Frank Arnold Davis, BEM, C/M.36634.
- Chief Engine Room Artificer Edward Charles Gosden, P/MX.50597.
- Chief Engine Room Artificer Edward George Mortimore Harris, C/M.35349.
- Chief Engine Room Artificer Edward Ernest Haywood, C/M.37224.
- Chief Engine Room Artificer Charles Sidney Hogan, P/M.35032.
- Chief Engine Room Artificer Donald Hornby, P/MX.50816.
- Chief Engine Room Artificer Harry Jenkins, D/MX.48491.
- Chief Engine Room Artificer George Jones, BEM, P/M.37025.
- Chief Engine Room Artificer Harry Knee, P/MX.48408.
- Chief Engine Room Artificer William Henry Mercer, P/MX.45230.
- Chief Engine Room Artificer Ronald Arthur Nightingale, P/MX.49257.
- Chief Engine Room Artificer William Edward Noble, C/M.2796.
- Chief Engine Room Artificer William Edward James Peters, P/MX.47330.
- Chief Engine Room Artificer George Charles Bertram Pledger, P/MX.47332.
- Chief Engine Room Artificer Arthur William Charles Pike, D/MX.54967.
- Chief Engine Room Artificer Donald Sherriff, D/MX.45258.
- Chief Engine Room Artificer Frank Reynolds Stallion, C/M.5619.
- Chief Engine Room Artificer Ernest Ridge Stone, D/M.14562.
- Chief Engine Room Artificer William Ralph Taylor, P/M.35142.
- Chief Engine Room Artificer Sydney Wilfred Thomas, D/MX.51651.
- Chief Engine Room Artificer Wilfred Ivor Tiller, BEM, C/M.34958.
- Chief Engine Room Artificer Charles Seymour Watts, P/MX.47826.
- Chief Engine Room Artificer John James Watts, P/MX.48126.
- Chief Engine Room Artificer Albert Thomas William Williams, P/M.35060.
- Temporary Acting Chief Engine Room Artificer Albert John Clark, D/MX.48680.
- Chief Engine Room Artificer Albert Edward Wood, C/MX.48509.
- Acting Chief Engine Room Artificer Horace Victor Johnson, C/MX.52658.
- Temporary Acting Chief Engine Room Artificer Geoffrey Rowlinson, PMX.49217.
- Temporary Acting Chief Engine Room Artificer Harold Henry William Tozer, D/MX.49612.
- Chief Mechanician Herbert Umpleby, C/K.65616.
- Chief Motor Mechanic Alfred Gordon Capps, C/MX.67740.
- Acting Chief Motor Mechanic Fourth Class Harry Ewart Charles Lyons, D/MX.70089.
- Chief Stoker Victor Stuart Ashwell, C/K.52131.
- Chief Stoker Allan James Barnett, P/K.62101.
- Chief Stoker Albert Edward Basil Burnett, P/K.60934.
- Chief Stoker John Richard Carter, DSM, C/K.61461.
- Chief Stoker Joseph Cummings, P/K.66303.
- Chief Stoker Stanley Victor Finch, C/K.63300.
- Chief Stoker Ernest Thomas Foster, P/K.59297.
- Chief Stoker Alfred James Jewson, C/K.58398.
- Chief Stoker Sidney Charles Le-Clercq, P/KX.75716.
- Chief Stoker Arthur Frederick Miles, C/K.55238.
- Chief Stoker George Mills, C/K.54432.
- Chief Stoker Sydney Harold Munday, P/K.46288.
- Chief Stoker Henry Edward Oakley, P/K.47282.
- Chief Stoker Thomas Pallett, C/KX.79812.
- Chief Stoker William Charles Ranger, C/K.56440.
- Chief Stoker Albert Edward Riggs, D/K.63385.
- Chief Stoker William Ernest Silverthorn, D/K.57568.
- Chief Electrical Artificer Clifford Edmunds, D/M.35627.
- Chief Electrical Artificer Sidney Richard Lamswood, D/MX.52953.
- Acting Chief Electrical Artificer Frank Ernest Allum, P/M.29341.
- Chief Ordnance Artificer Will Berry, P/M.12401.
- Chief Ordnance Artificer James Henderson, P/M.36715.
- Chief Ordnance Artificer Thomas Gillet, C/M.37114.
- Chief Ordnance Artificer Joseph Jeffery, D/MX.58037.
- Chief Ordnance Artificer Clifford Lewis Say, D/M.39036.
- Chief Shipwright Charles Thomas Kempton, C/MX.45531.
- Chief Shipwright Eric Rice, P/M.36763.
- Chief Shipwright William Ernest Sage, P/M.34723.
- Sick Berth Chief Petty Officer Herbert William Dench, C/M.36239.
- Sick Berth Chief Petty Officer John Murray, P/M.36437.
- Sick Berth Chief Petty Officer Edgar Harold Treadwell, D/M.38037.
- Chief Petty Officer Writer Frederick Sydney Kedge, D/LMX.45464.
- Chief Petty Officer Writer John Neill, C/MX.53542.
- Chief Petty Officer Writer Stanley William Walker, P/MX,4669O.
- Supply Chief Petty Officer John William Henry Brookshaw, D/MX.47148.
- Supply Chief Petty Officer Daniel Francis Deevy, D/MX.45843.
- Supply Chief Petty Officer Victor Frank Heather, C/MX.45879.
- Supply Chief Petty Officer Reginald John Read, C/M.39031.
- Supply Chief Petty Officer Francis Bune Warren, D/MX.49411.
- Master-at-Arms Edward Thomas Castle, C/M.37115.
- Master-at-Arms Joseph Deegan, D/M.39936.
- Master-at-Arms William George Geary, DSM, C/M.39271.
- Master-at-Arms William Frederick Goldup, C/M.39833.
- Master-at-Arms John Gray, D/M.39906.
- Master-at-Arms Frederick Ernest Mudge, D/M.39593.
- Temporary Master-at-Arms Sidney James Franklin, P/M.40095.
- Chief Petty Officer Cook Robert Edward Hayes, P/MX.45826.
- Chief Petty Officer Cook Reginald Thomas James, D/M.14856.
- Chief Petty Officer Cook Horace Latham, C/M.36990.
- Chief Petty Officer Cook (S) Archie George Norman, P/MX.47270.
- Chief Petty Officer Cook (S) Leslie Arthur Wilde, C/M.36880.
- Chief Engineman Robert Slater, DSM, LT/X.408E.T., Royal Naval Reserve.
- Chief Engineman Francis Smyth, LT/KX.114613, Royal Naval Patrol Service.
- Chief Engineman Charles Newby Tofton, LT/KX.99983, Royal Naval Patrol Service.
- Acting Chief Engineman Hugh McGrory, LT/KX.107523, Royal Naval Patrol Service.
- Acting Chief Engineman George Arthur Milledge, LT/KX.97916, Royal Naval Patrol Service.
- Second Hand Arthur Marjoram, LT/KX.280641, Royal Naval Patrol Service.
- Second Hand Alfred James Phillips, LT/JX.173277, Royal Naval Patrol Service.
- Second Hand William John Pleasants, LT/JX.241953, Royal Naval Patrol Service.
- Second Hand William James Sutherland, LT/JX.200916, Royal Naval Patrol Service.
- Colour Sergeant (Temporary) Harold Alfred Sellex, Po.21709O, Royal Marines.
- Acting Flight Sergeant Thomas Collier, 534459, Royal Air Force.
- Canteen Manager David Leonard Chapman, NAAFI.
- Canteen Manager Percy Walter Richardson, C/NX.2110, NAAFI.
- Canteen Manager Reginald Alfred Tapp, C/NX.1440, NAAFI.
- Engine Room Artificer First Class Robert Cameron, C/M.272438.
- Engine Room Artificer Second Class Kennington Charles Taylor, D/MX.51585.
- Engine Room Artificer Fourth Class William Harold Kokkinn, S.A.67612.
- Mechanician First Class Frederick Cyril Darbin, P/KX.80931.
- Electrical Artificer William Harper, D/MX.48114.
- Electrical Artificer First Class William Robert Donald Jack Lewis, D/MX.45947.
- Electrical Artificer Second Class Harry George Martin Aylward, D/MX.45296.
- Electrical Artificer Second Class William Shepperd, D/MX.64796.
- Electrical Artificer Third Class Leonard Henry Martin, C/MX.57384.
- Shipwright First Class Albert Victor Gutteridge, C/M.24705.
- Shipwright First Class James William Hyslop, D/M.7902.
- Shipwright First Class William John Smeardon, D/M.6463.
- Air Artificer Fourth Class David Norman Owen, FAA/FX.75178.
- Air Fitter (E) Walter Arthur Johnstone, FAA/FX.79659.
- Mechanician James Charles Ridgeon, P/KX.64726.
- Mechanician First Class Leslie Madden, P/KX.84335.
- Petty Officer Charles Victor Anstee, D/JX.128819.
- Petty Officer Norman Arnold, P/JX.130293.
- Petty Officer Bernard Bannell, P/JX.146274.
- Petty Officer George Arthur Cawood, D/J.106370.
- Petty Officer John William Connell, D/J.104231.
- Petty Officer Howard Fudge, D/JX.136376.
- Petty Officer Lauchlan Maclean Watt Gibb, D/J.63411.
- Petty Officer James Stanley Goffin, DSM, P/JX.128836.
- Petty Officer George Edward Gray, D/JX.109098.
- Petty Officer John Charles Griffin, C/JX.129899.
- Petty Officer Ernest William Harvey, P/J.108159.
- Petty Officer Keith William Harvey, P/JX.146404.
- Petty Officer Seymour George Harvey, C/J.39121.
- Petty Officer Frederick Charles Hurd, P/JX.133627.
- Petty Officer Ronald Sidney Kettle, P/J.1117091.
- Petty Officer Horace Charles William Littlewood, P/JX.128125.
- Petty Officer Raymond Lucas, P/JX.143777.
- Petty Officer Edwin Douglas Redgrave, C/JX.135635.
- Petty Officer Ronald Cedric Roots, C/J.112030.
- Petty Officer Arthur Victor Rumsey, P/JX.149530.
- Petty Officer Ousainou Sarr.
- Petty Officer Sidney Joseph Shinn, P/J.114221.
- Petty Officer Joshua Southern, P/JX.144271.
- Petty Officer Edgar Charles Oscar Thomas, D/J.114174.
- Petty Officer Edward Henry Jobson, C/6201D, Royal Naval Reserve.
- Petty Officer Leonard Wheeler, P.6086D, Royal Naval Reserve.
- Temporary Petty Officer Charles Armstrong, P/JX.132588.
- Temporary Petty Officer Stanley Clarke, D/JX.132602.
- Temporary Acting Petty Officer James Harold Oscar Fookes, P/JX.153207.
- Temporary Acting Petty Officer Christopher Harris, C/JX.139104.
- Temporary Petty Officer Victor George Richard Hamling, C/JX.142863.
- Acting Petty Officer Horace Sanders, P/SSX.19496.
- Temporary Acting Petty Officer William Frederick George, P/J.9363.
- Temporary Acting Petty Officer Ernest John Reeves, P/J.30893.
- Temporary Petty Officer Ernest Thorneley, D/JX.141817.
- Yeoman of Signals Harry Thomson Bell, D/JX.133015.
- Yeoman of Signals Albert Ernest Blood, P/JX.139771.
- Yeoman of Signals George Alfred Newell, C/JX.142148.
- Yeoman of Signals Reginald George Norris Phillips, P/JX.130394.
- Yeoman of Signals Jack Frederick Terry, P/JX.134731.
- Yeoman of Signals Charles James White, D/JX.132154.
- Acting Yeoman of Signals Edward Arthur Newnes, D/J.94713.
- Acting Yeoman of Signals Robert Henry West, C/J.42674.
- Temporary Acting Yeoman of Signals George William Thomas Richard Bullock, D/JX.132967.
- Temporary Acting Yeoman of Signals George Henry Davis, P/JX.133026.
- Temporary Acting Convoy Yeoman of Signals Reginald Herbert Clarke, C/JX.174051.
- Temporary Acting Convoy Yeoman of Signals Robert Oliver Reginald Pell, C/JX.171158.
- Petty Officer Telegraphist Reginald James Attridge, P/JX.139311.
- Petty Officer Telegraphist Malcolm Arthur Leslie Berridge, P/JX.134533.
- Petty Officer Telegraphist Ernest Brewerton, P/JX.137454.
- Petty Officer Telegraphist Walter Percy Edney, P/JX.142184.
- Petty Officer Telegraphist Douglas Frank Kingston, D/J.108514.
- Petty Officer Telegraphist Alec John Monk, C/JX.125480.
- Petty Officer Telegraphist John Downie Morrison, D/J.101674.
- Petty Officer Telegraphist Fred Moore, D/JX.163849.
- Petty Officer Telegraphist William Parkin, D/JX.131023.
- Petty Officer Telegraphist Ernest William Pike, J/DX.133716.
- Petty Officer Telegraphist Walter John Sallis, P/JX.140993.
- Petty Officer Telegraphist George Henry Steers, C/JX.144847.
- Temporary Acting Petty Officer Telegraphist Frederick Roy Wilkinson, C/JX.140018.
- Stoker Petty Officer Wilfred Booth, D/KX.81117.
- Stoker Petty Officer William Cochrane Mathieson Caldwell, C/KX.75894.
- Stoker Petty Officer Colin Silas Carpenter, P/K.15822.
- Stoker Petty Officer Charles Henry Chilton, D/K.56399.
- Stoker Petty Officer Thomas William Dyke, P/K.65103.
- Stoker Petty Officer Charles Samuel Flower, C/K.58301.
- Stoker Petty Officer John Peter Haylock, C/KX.81544.
- Stoker Petty Officer Frank Jacobs Haggett, D/KX.79682.
- Stoker Petty Officer Joseph Cecil Hulkes, C/K.30181.
- Stoker Petty Officer William Richard Henry Kerswell, D/K.60161.
- Stoker Petty Officer Frederick Charles Jobson, C/K.66830.
- Stoker Petty Officer Richard William Long, C/K.22794.
- Stoker Petty Officer Frederick George Maidens, P/KX.75934.
- Stoker Petty Officer Charles Mitchell, P/KX.75119.
- Stoker Petty Officer Jethro Reuben Maries, D/K.24311.
- Stoker Petty Officer Robert Maddocks Naylor, C/KX.79092.
- Stoker Petty Officer William George Ridges, P/K.57005.
- Stoker Petty Officer James Sheldrake, P/K.59933.
- Stoker Petty Officer Alexander Marshall, C/K.63971.
- Stoker Petty Officer Edward Stratton, P/K.57596.
- Stoker Petty Officer Archie Chrissie Thompson, C/K.58743.
- Petty Officer Air Mechanic (O) Dennis Reginald Mottram, FAA/FX.77071.
- Petty Officer Motor Mechanic Colin Victor Brutey, P/MX.78564.
- Petty Officer Motor Mechanic Reginald Charles Peacock, P/MX.76507.
- Supply Petty Officer Frederick George Jones, D/MX.50441.
- Temporary Supply Petty Officer Eric Ralph Harris, P/MX.46846.
- Temporary Supply Petty Officer Harold Ling, P/MX.54155.
- Temporary Supply Petty Officer Jack Leonard Parnell, D/MX.59620.
- Petty Officer Writer Jack William Pegg, P/MX.53538.
- Temporary Petty Officer Writer Frederick James Belshaw, C/MX.55432.
- Temporary Petty Officer Writer John Grenfell, D/MX.60907.
- Petty Officer Cook George Watson Ellis, P/MX49473.
- Petty Officer Cook Samuel Goodwin, C/M.35696.
- Petty Officer Steward William Alfred Sherman, P/LX.20414.
- Sergeant Robert Walter Evans, CH.24734, Royal Marines.
- Sergeant John Thomson, Ply.22409, Royal Marines.
- Acting Temporary Sergeant Charles Baden Fallows, Ply.19747, Royal Marines.
- Acting Temporary Sergeant William Greer, Ch.248, Royal Marines.
- Acting Temporary Sergeant John Hart, Po.18997, Royal Marines.
- Acting Temporary Sergeant George Joseph Stanley Rickwood, Ch.21230, Royal Marines.
- Acting Temporary Sergeant John Mansfield Ryan, Ply.21894, Royal Marines.
- Acting Temporary Sergeant Arthur Steeple, Ch.21402, Royal Marines.
- Acting Temporary Sergeant Frederick Harold Stone, Ply.21231, Royal Marines.
- Acting Temporary Sergeant Harry West, Po.216342, Royal Marines.
- Engineman Harry Thomas Burgess, LT/KX.101614, Royal Naval Patrol Service.
- Engineman David Tait Cowe, LT/KX.124528, Royal Naval Patrol Service.
- Engineman Cyril Gray, LT/KX.110019, Royal Naval Patrol Service.
- Engineman James Reid Jappy, LT/KX.101218, Royal Naval Patrol Service.
- Engineman Charles Beaumont Lennox, LT/KX.124597, Royal Naval Patrol Service.
- Engineman Cyril Frederick Rusted, LT/KX.106852, Royal Naval Patrol Service.
- Engineman Alfred William Stimpson, LT/KX.107951, Royal Naval Patrol Service.
- Engineman Bertie George Turrel, LT/KX.99967, Royal Naval Patrol Service.
- Sergeant Leonard Rex White, 362230, Royal Air Force.
- Leading Seaman John Garside Alexander, LT/JX.212712, Royal Naval Patrol Service.
- Leading Seaman Sydney Lawson Barnett, LT/JX.185262, Royal Naval Patrol Service.
- Leading Seaman Alan James Cherrett, P/JX.125402.
- Leading Seaman John Henry Day, LT/JX.186671, Royal Naval Patrol Service.
- Leading Seaman Leslie John Fletcher, LT/JX.225174, Royal Naval Patrol Service.
- Leading Seaman Walter Herdman, LT/JX.242236, Royal Naval Patrol Service.
- Leading Seaman Claude Douglas Millard, C/SSX.13779.
- Leading Seaman Daniel Sutherland, LT/X.7232, C, Royal Naval Reserve.
- Leading Seaman Albert Swain, LT/JX.243388.
- Leading Seaman Edward Cecil Tufrey, C/J.65747.
- Leading Seaman John Walden, P/JX.130555.
- Leading Seaman Sidney Naisby Welsh, D/SSX.13960.
- Temporary Acting Leading Seaman Sidney William Walton, C/JX.126356.
- Temporary Acting Leading Seaman Frank Henry Wridgway.
- Convoy Leading Signalman Francis Ireland, C/JX.171118.
- Acting Leading Signalman Alexander Massie, P/JX.130055.
- Temporary Acting Leading Signalman Henry McMinigle, D/JX.210385.
- Leading Telegraphist John Charles, P/JX.225866.
- Leading Telegraphist John Thomas Lane, C/JX.140415.
- Leading Telegraphist James Robert Hills, D/J.87450.
- Temporary Leading Telegraphist Basil Beverley Bleakley, C/JX.153691.
- Acting Leading Telegraphist William Gillespie, D/JX.224729.
- Leading Motor Mechanic Leonard James Gater, P/MX.98470.
- Leading Motor Mechanic Stanley James Tallyn, C/MX.77181.
- Leading Wireman Geoffrey Johnson, C/MX.73372.
- Leading Wireman Edward William Tallowin, C/MX.63963.
- Leading Wireman Aubrey George Cecil Matthews, D/JX.167407.
- Leading Wireman Edward Harry Vose, C/MX.62833.
- Acting Leading Wireman William James Lister, C/MX.77822.
- Leading Stoker Joseph Durham, P/K.19078.
- Leading Stoker James Greaves, C/KX.89738.
- Leading Stoker William Nesbitt, P/KX.93588.
- Acting Leading Stoker Frank Foulger, C/KX.78892.
- Leading Stoker George Jefferson, D/KX.77989.
- Leading Stoker Ernest Will Turner, D/K.57391.
- Temporary Acting Leading Stoker Alexander Maclean, D/KX.103758.
- Leading Wireless Mechanic Ronald Cooper, P/JX.270787.
- Temporary Leading Sick Berth Attendant John Edwin Game, C/SBR/X.7658.
- Officers Cook Second Class Leslie Watson Olsen, C/LX.20451.
- Leading Cook Dennis Albert George Donovan, LT/MX.83568.
- Leading Cook Victor Frederick Casey Hogbin, LT/MX.83214.
- Diesel Greaser Frederick Honan, 225423.
- Diesel Storekeeper Thomas Harrison, NAPR.72172.
- Leading Aircraftman Ernest John Holmes, 543359, Royal Air Force.
- Able Seaman Thomas Ackroyd, D/J.114092.
- Able Seaman Lewis Anderton, D/JX.227903.
- Able Seaman Ernest George Brock, P/J.36656.
- Able Seaman Jasper Barton Brookfield, P/J.41635.
- Able Seaman John Borthwick, C/JX.199342.
- Able Seaman Ernest Leslie Crouchman, C/JX.203359.
- Able Seaman Sydney Dixon Gunn, D/J.79464.
- Able Seaman Herbert William Harrison, P/SSX.31505.
- Able Seaman Stanley Howard Hatton, C/JX.300928.
- Able Seaman Frank Higham, D/JX.238690.
- Able Seaman Sidney Robert Hodges, D/JX.178494.
- Able Seaman Frederick Howard Holmes, P/JX.311135.
- Able Seaman Cyril George Leveridge, C/J.44392.
- Able Seaman Stephen John Maull Olive, C/J.103680.
- Able Seaman George Phineas Phillips, D/J.38207.
- Able Seaman Leo Power, C/JX.173361.
- Able Seaman William John Pyle, D/SSX.18628.
- Able Seaman Terence Patrick Ryan, D/JX.184888.
- Able Seaman Albert Isaac Spicer, D/J 109329.
- Able Seaman William Henry Tedder, C/J.101768.
- Able Seaman Ernest Townsend, C/JX.172383.
- Able Seaman Henry Weir, PUD/X.1303, Royal Naval Volunteer Reserve.
- Able Seaman Herbert John Willingham, D/J.79469.
- Able Seaman Alan Beresford Price, S.A.N.F.(V).P/R.N.V.R.SA.68261.
- Telegraphist Stanley Samuel Brown, P/JX.178225.
- Signalman David Anderson Guild, D/JX.309387.
- Signalman Frederick James Jenkins, LT/JX.175545, Royal Naval Patrol Service.
- Signalman William Frederick Francis Munns, C/LDX.3731.
- Signalman Eric Nicholson, D/JX.136062.
- Convoy Signalman Walter Murray Donald, C/JX.186255.
- Convoy Signalman Harold Herbert Dutton, C/JX.186257.
- Convoy Signalman George Lloyd, C/JX.186265.
- Wireman Robert John McCoy, C/MX.76998.
- Stoker First Class Frederick Vivian Cadogan, D/K.59151.
- Stoker Robert Louis Carwithen, LT/KX.211113, Royal Naval Patrol Service.
- Stoker First Class Edward William Murray Gooda, D/KX.107582.
- Stoker First Class William Stanley Gough, D/KX.116421.
- Stoker John James Webb, D/K.66618.
- Stoker First Class Horace Roy Howard, LT/KX.131482, Royal Naval Patrol Service.
- Stoker First Class Gerald Bowen Thomas, D/KX.95319.
- Corporal Samuel William Fowler, 530951, Royal Air Force.
- Corporal John Robert Shankland, 353212, Royal Air Force.
- Corporal (Temporary) Arthur Lawson, Ply.X.2600, Royal Marines.
- Rigger William Frank Bailey Chilcott, R/JX.180746.
- Rigger Albert William Ford, R/JX.164616.
- Acting Temporary Corporal Edward Joseph Swinnock, Ch.21166, Royal Marines.
- Acting Temporary Corporal Frederick Ernest Benham, Po.210755, Royal Marines.
- Seaman Donald Brace, LT/JX.222290, Royal Naval Patrol Service.
- Seaman Albert Edwin Chambers, LT/JX.225659, Royal Naval Patrol Service.
- Seaman Arthur Charles Dolby, LT/JX.241596, Royal Naval Patrol Service.
- Seaman William Percy Gale, LT/JX.203664, Royal Naval Patrol Service.
- Seaman Vivian George Gray, LT/JX.188990, Royal Naval Patrol Service.
- Seaman John Mackay, LT/JX.210812, Royal Naval Patrol Service.
- Seaman John Frank Murton, LT/JX.211113, Royal Naval Patrol Service.
- Seaman Edmund Pryor, LT/JX 196247, Royal Naval Patrol Service.
- Seaman Andrew Ritchie Smith, LT/JX202259, Royal Naval Patrol Service.
- Seaman Raymond Claude Tobitt, LT/JX.210974.
- Assistant Steward Charles King Mitchell, NAP/R.223820.
- Ordinary Telegraphist Stephen Trevor Bates, G/JX.204013.
- Marine John Clarke, Ply.22176, Royal Marines.
- Marine Noel James Luxton, Ply.20687, Royal Marines.
- Marine John Shepherd, Ply.20544, Royal Marines.
- Marine Charles Henry Wheeldon, Ply.X.3198, Royal Marines.

Mention in Despatches (Posthumous)

- Chief Engineman James Watson, LT/X.462EU, Royal Naval Reserve.
- Temporary Acting Leading Seaman John Wardropper Turner, D/JX.190958.
- Able Seaman Arthur Forbes Franklin, P/JX.264573

=== Honorary Chaplain to His Majesty ===
- The Reverend Canon Fred Baker, TD, Chaplain to the Forces, 2nd Class, Royal Army Chaplains' Department, Territorial Army.

=== Royal Red Cross (RRC) ===
Royal Navy

...for outstanding zeal, patience, and cheerfulness, and for courage and wholehearted devotion to duty while serving in HM Naval Hospitals in the last six months or more of War.

- Isobel Helen Price, ARRC, Matron.
- Edith Hope, ARRC, Acting Superintending Sister.

Army

- Helen Mary Adam, Sister (acting Matron) (206007), Queen Alexandra's Imperial Military Nursing Service.
- Helen Shiels Gillespie, Sister (acting Matron) (206162), Queen Alexandra's Imperial Military Nursing Service.
- Lilian Mary Runnings, Sister (206197), Queen Alexandra's Imperial Military Nursing Service.
- Dorothy Nicholson, Sister (acting Matron) (206349), Queen Alexandra's Imperial Military Nursing Service.
- Janet Sybil Mary Pollock, Sister (acting Matron) (206377), Queen Alexandra's Imperial Military Nursing Service.
- Margaret Russell, Matron (206403), Queen Alexandra's Imperial Military Nursing Service.
- Norah Kathleen Smyth, Sister (acting Matron) (206435), Queen Alexandra's Imperial Military Nursing Service.
- Dorothy Jane Cooper, Sister (206067), Queen Alexandra's Imperial Military Nursing Service Reserve.

Royal Air Force

- Matron Lilla Eliza Taylor, ARRC, Princess Mary's Royal Air Force Nursing Service.
- Matron Catherine Walker, ARRC, Princess Mary's Royal Air Force Nursing Service.

==== Bar to the Royal Red Cross ====
- Susannah Frances Davies, RRC, Matron (206648), Queen Alexandra's Imperial Military Nursing Service.
- Dinah Jessie MacGregor, RRC, Matron (206650), Queen Alexandra's Imperial Military Nursing Service.

==== Associate of the Royal Red Cross (ARRC) ====
Royal Navy

- Jean Kathleen Gillanders, Acting Matron, Queen Alexandra's Royal Naval Nursing Service.
- Ella Kate Cheetham, Superintending Sister, Queen Alexandra's Royal Naval Nursing Service.
- Ailleen Marjorie Taylor, Superintending Sister, Queen Alexandra's Royal Naval Nursing Service.
- Helen MacLaren Paterson, Acting Superintending Sister, Queen Alexandra's Royal Naval Nursing Service (Reserve).
- Nancy Winberry Booth, Nursing Sister, Queen Alexandra's Royal Naval Nursing Service (Reserve).
- Muriel Ernestine Myers, Nursing Sister, Queen Alexandra's Royal Naval Nursing Service (Reserve).
- Agnes Ralston Aileen Mackay, VAD Nursing Member.
- Elizabeth Katherine Willis-Fleming, VAD Nursing Member.
- Margaret Frances Stubington, VAD Nursing Member.
- Mary Steward Tardrew, VAD Nursing Member.
- Frances Mary Marsh, VAD Nursing Member.

Army

- Florence Barbara Cozens, Sister (acting Matron) (206096), Queen Alexandra's Imperial Military Nursing Service.
- Irene Patricia Entwistle, Sister (acting Matron) (206317), Queen Alexandra's Imperial Military Nursing Service.
- Helen Crerar, Sister (206862), Queen Alexandra's Imperial Military Nursing Service Reserve.
- Margaret Annie Violet Mary De Gruchy, Sister (206926), Queen Alexandra's Imperial Military Nursing Service Reserve.
- Margaret Smart Hamilton, Sister (208443), Queen Alexandra's Imperial Military Nursing Service Reserve.
- Sarah Lambe Irving, Sister (208514), Queen Alexandra's Imperial Military Nursing Service Reserve.
- Madge Evelyn Jagged, Sister (208515), Queen Alexandra's Imperial Military Nursing Service Reserve.
- Rhoda Jekyll, Sister (acting Matron) (208516), Queen Alexandra's Imperial Military Nursing Service Reserve.
- Maud Besly, Sister (209820), Territorial Army Nursing Service.
- Muriel Mabel Plunder, Sister (213258), Territorial Army Nursing Service.

Royal Air Force

- Acting Matron Ethel Maud Buckley, Princess Mary's Royal Air Force Nursing Service.
- Acting Matron Louisa Banham Cartledge, Princess Mary's Royal Air Force Nursing Service.
- Acting Matron Mary Beresford Charles-Worth, Princess Mary's Royal Air Force Nursing Service.
- Senior Sister Evelyn Kate Griffin, Princess Mary's Royal Air Force Nursing Service.
- Acting Senior Sister Jessie Katherine Annie Browne, Princess Mary's Royal Air Force Nursing Service.
- Acting Senior Sister Winifred Marianne Cave, Princess Mary's Royal Air Force Nursing Service.
- Acting Senior Sister Margaret Turner Thorburn, Princess Mary's Royal Air Force Nursing Service.
- Acting Senior Sister Katherine Florence Woodcock, Princess Mary's Royal Air Force Nursing Service.
- Sister Freda Helena Willcox, Princess Mary's Royal Air Force Nursing Service.

=== Royal Air Force ===
==== Air Force Cross (AFC) ====
- Wing Commander William Steven Gardner, DFC, (37457).
- Wing Commander Geoffrey Lowe, DFC, (37324).
- Wing Commander Duncan Charles Ruthven Macdonald (37017).
- Acting Wing Commander Geoffrey Cecil Clements Bartlett (39022), Reserve of Air Force Officers.
- Acting Wing Commander Edward Charles Foreman (22180).
- Acting Wing Commander Thorfinn James Gunn, DFC, (41401), Reserve of Air Force Officers.
- Acting Wing Commander Edward Stanley Smith (90093), Auxiliary Air Force.
- Squadron Leader James Ronald Appleton (39773).
- Squadron Leader Kenneth John Douglas Dickson (36140).
- Squadron Leader Patrick Green (90005), Auxiliary Air Force.
- Squadron Leader Frank Cromwell Griffiths (37967).
- Squadron Leader Oliver James O'Brien (43621).
- Squadron Leader Robert Lester Palmer (15195).
- Squadron Leader Dudley William Thomas Withers (40161), Reserve of Air Force Officers.
- Acting Squadron Leader Ernest Leonard Archer (78735), Royal Air Force Volunteer Reserve.
- Acting Squadron Leader William Brereton, MBE, (45406).
- Acting Squadron Leader Edward Frederick James O'Doire, DFC, (43139).
- Acting Squadron Leader Lawrence Michael O'Leary (41728), Reserve of Air Force Officers.
- Acting Squadron Leader Michael Hawken Pearce (80298), Royal Air Force Volunteer Reserve.
- Acting Squadron Leader Richard John Bennett Pearse (78521), Royal Air Force Volunteer Reserve.
- Acting Squadron Leader David Lawrence Pitt (83986), Royal Air Force Volunteer Reserve.
- Acting Squadron Leader Harry Proctor Powell (37891), Royal Air Force Volunteer Reserve.
- Acting Squadron Leader Leonard Fitch Ratcliff, DFC, (87022), Royal Air Force Volunteer Reserve.
- Acting Squadron Leader Samuel Richard Thomas, DFC, (42029).
- Acting Squadron Leader Douglas Walter Triptree (41966).
- Acting Squadron Leader Jack Edmund Watts (36144).
- Flight Lieutenant Leslie Stephen Holman (43171).
- Flight Lieutenant Robert Kronfeld (78782), Royal Air Force Volunteer Reserve.
- Flight Lieutenant Joseph Finlay Marshall (46669).
- Flight Lieutenant Brian Watson McMillan (40550), Reserve of Air Force Officers.
- Flight Lieutenant John Raymond Micklethwait (74721), Royal Air Force Volunteer Reserve.
- Flight Lieutenant John Arthur Newington (40842), Reserve of Air Force Officers.
- Flight Lieutenant Joe Northrop (43138).
- Flight Lieutenant Michael George Olley (73008), Royal Air Force Volunteer Reserve.
- Flight Lieutenant Arthur Reece, DFC, (44128).
- Flight Lieutenant James Leonard Sharp (43374).
- Flight Lieutenant John Eric Peter Thompson (77794), Royal Air Force Volunteer Reserve.
- Flight Lieutenant Leonard Mountstephen Whetham (70729), Royal Air Force Volunteer Reserve.
- Acting Flight Lieutenant Clive Halse (78724), Royal Air Force Volunteer Reserve.
- Acting Flight Lieutenant Arthur Ronald Head (82711), Royal Air Force Volunteer Reserve.
- Acting Flight Lieutenant Frank Horace Raymond Hulbert (123641), Royal Air Force Volunteer Reserve.
- Acting Flight Lieutenant Norman Paterson Kerr (115342), Royal Air Force Volunteer Reserve.
- Acting Flight Lieutenant Arthur Avarne James Sanders, DFC, (33578).
- Acting Flight Lieutenant Philip Keith Smulian (102533), Royal Air Force Volunteer Reserve.
- Acting Flight Lieutenant Ernest Albert Southey (110344), Royal Air Force Volunteer Reserve.
- Flying Officer Norman John Bonnar (69437), Royal Air Force Volunteer Reserve.
- Flying Officer Kenneth Richard Wilson Eager (63838), Royal Air Force Volunteer Reserve.
- Flying Officer William Henry Morton (110305), Royal Air Force Volunteer Reserve.
- Flying Officer Frederick Arthur Rickaby (100041), Royal Air Force Volunteer Reserve.
- Flying Officer Noel Thomas Henry Scott (130065), Royal Air Force Volunteer Reserve.
- Flying Officer Raoul Alfred Gerald Tucker (126779), Royal Air Force Volunteer Reserve.
- Pilot Officer Wilfred Seaman (125757), Royal Air Force Volunteer Reserve.
- Warrant Officer Arthur William Eade (563253).
- Squadron Leader William Scott Maddocks (Aus.360), Royal Australian Air Force.
- Flight Lieutenant James Herbert Harper (Aus.1382).
- Squadron Leader Edgar Francis Harvie, Royal New Zealand Air Force.
- Squadron Leader Ronald Bruce Leslie MacGregor, Royal New Zealand Air Force.

===== Bar to Air Force Cross =====
- Group Captain Harry Alexander Purvis, DFC, AFC.
- Squadron Leader Thomas Aston Heath, AFC, (70294), Royal Air Force Volunteer Reserve.
- Squadron Leader Samuel Wroath, AFC, (36125).

==== Air Force Medal (AFM) ====
- 989022 Flight Sergeant John Robert Clark Affleck.
- 1281451 Flight Sergeant Raymond Alfred Baker.
- 808267 Flight Sergeant George Robert Burdon, Auxiliary Air Force.
- 931487 Flight Sergeant Ronald Arthur Elsom.
- 751336 Flight Sergeant John Napier, Royal Air Force Volunteer Reserve.
- 610375 Flight Sergeant Stanley Charles Phillips.
- 1208937 Flight Sergeant Percival Ambrose Shardlow.
- 912596 Sergeant John William Kyle, DFM.
- 571905 Sergeant Hugh William Price.
- 742217 Sergeant Alfred Walter Wylde, Royal Air Force Volunteer Reserve.
- 534308 Acting Sergeant Gerald Oakes.
- Aus.406352 Flight Sergeant (now Warrant Officer) Francis Felix Fahey, Royal Australian Air Force.

==== King's Commendation for Brave Conduct ====
Squadron Leader

- J. H. Gem (80871) (Acting), Royal Air Force Volunteer Reserve.

Warrant Officers

- G. F. Fuller (515026).
- J. Manning (411709).
- G. T. Miles (441710).
- J. D. Sandy (411708).

Sergeants

- 845107 A. E. Follett, Auxiliary Air Force.
- 1578128 B. A. Jones.
- 505597 B. J. Ross.

Leading Aircraftman

- 627145 R. B. Hyde.

Aircraftman, 1st Class

  - 317773 S. T. Chapman.

Corporal, Women's Auxiliary Air Force

- 2024223 J. M. E. Standing.

Aircraftwoman, 1st Class, Women's Auxiliary Air Force

- 2046088 M. McBurnie.

VAD Nursing Member

- R. M. Berridge (W.575030).

==== King's Commendation for Valuable Service in the Air ====
United Kingdom

- John William Affleck, Flight Engineer, Royal Air Force Ferry Command.
- Captain Edward Samson Alcock, British Overseas Airways Corporation.
- Captain Howard Whitmore Cecil Alger, British Overseas Airways Corporation.
- Captain Michael Fison Attwell, British Overseas Airways Corporation.
- Captain Alistair Peter Wishart Cane, British Overseas Airways Corporation.
- Eric Gilbert Cosgrove, Radio Officer, British Overseas Airways Corporation.
- Francis William Coughlan, Radio Officer, Royal Air Force Ferry Command.
- James Wilson Gray, Radio Operator, Royal Air Force Ferry Command.
- Captain Maurice William Haddon, British Overseas Airways Corporation.
- Edwin Lewis Wigmore Hagger, Radio Officer, British Overseas Airways Corporation.
- Captain John Potbury Kirton, British Overseas Airways Corporation.
- Reginald Zacharia Martin (deceased), Radio Officer, British Overseas Airways Corporation.
- Captain Charles William Edmund Nigel Cavendish Pelly, British Overseas Airways Corporation.
- Captain Walter Godfrey Pudney, British Overseas Airways Corporation.
- Ronald Robert Williams, Flight Engineer, Royal Air Force Ferry Command.
- Captain Joseph Newman Wilson, British Overseas Airways Corporation.
- Captain Hugh Oswald Woodhouse, British Overseas Airways Corporation.

Royal Air Force

Wing Commanders

- A. V. Bax (05189).
- A. W. R. Lawson (28225) (Acting).

Squadron Leaders

- G. L. Blake (06225).
- R. M. Blennerhassett, AFC, (37786).
- P. B. N. Davis (70499), Royal Air Force Volunteer Reserve.
- T. H. A. Llewellyn, AFC, (74656) (Acting), Royal Air Force Volunteer Reserve.
- N. F. Morris (39556), Reserve of Air Force Officers.
- A. R. Turpin (70590), Reserve of Air Force Officers.
- A. R. Wright (33499).
- C. P. Wright (39427).
- J. B. Chinnery (44560) (Acting).
- E. P. G. Moyna (64317) (Acting), Royal Air Force Volunteer Reserve.

Flight Lieutenants

- R. A. Bourlay (80291), Royal Air Force Volunteer Reserve.
- F. W. Cook (45090).
- P. Drummond (74729), Royal Air Force Volunteer Reserve.
- H. J. Hartland, DFC, (43068).
- T. D. Saul (42080).
- J. C. Smyth (70635), Reserve of Air Force Officers.
- J. Woodroffe (40777).
- J. D. Hill (106673) (Acting), Royal Air Force Volunteer Reserve.

Flying Officers

- D. B. Halcro, DFC, (46128).
- G. W. Kelly (115276), Royal Air Force Volunteer Reserve.
- R. T. Stokes (87031), Royal Air Force Volunteer Reserve.
- A. C. Wilson (46781).
- J. G. Thomson (N.Z.413510), Royal New Zealand Air Force.

Pilot Officers

- F. R. Ford (49734) (since deceased).
- M. G. Gardiner, DFM, (50222).

Warrant Officers

- P. F. Laver (508810).
- A. E. Maxwell (904854) (Acting).

Flight Sergeants

- 1289030 F. G. Baker.
- 917614 D. Ellis.
- 1293654 F. A. Johnson.
- 643726 J. Rochford.

Sergeant

- 648781 R. Walton.

Leading Aircraftman

- 624910 S. A. Gregory.

==== Mention in despatches ====
Air Vice-Marshals

- J. H. D'Albiac, CB, DSO.
- F. H. M. Maynard, CB.
- A. E. Panter, MRCS, LRCP, KHS.
- T. A. Langford-Sainsbury, OBE, DFC, AFC, (Acting).

Air Commodores

- H. J. F. Hunter, CBE, MC.
- G. M. Lawson, CBE, MC.
- A. Macgregor, MBE, DFC.
- J. M. Mason, DSC, DFC.
- S. P. Simpson, CBE, MC.
- H. G. Smart, CBE, DFC, AFC.
- T. A. Warne-Browne, DSC.
- G. Harcourt-Smith, MVO, CBE, (Acting)
- I. T. Lloyd, CBE, (Acting).
- F. B. Ludlow, OBE, MC, (Acting).
- A. J. Rankin, OBE, AFC, (Acting).
- J. R. Scarlett-Streatfeild, CBE, (Acting).
- W. E. Theak (Acting).
- F. Woolley, OBE, DFC, (Acting).

Group Captains

- C. D. Adams, OBE.
- A. G. Adnams.
- C. L. Archbold, OBE.
- E. D. Barnes, AFC.
- F. E. P. Barrington.
- R. P. Batty.
- D. L. Blackford.
- R. S. Blucke, AFC.
- C. D. C. Boyce.
- D. A. Boyle, AFC.
- F. J. St. G. Braithwaite, OBE.
- W. A. D. Brook.
- G. M. Bryer, OBE, AFC.
- G. P. Chamberlain, OBE.
- R. A. A. Cole, OBE.
- A. R. Combe.
- P. D. Cracroft, AFC.
- L. Dalton-Morris.
- C. W. Dicken.
- T. H. England, DSC, AFC.
- C. L. Falconer, OBE.
- E. M. F. Grundy, OBE.
- R. W. Hill.
- C. E. Horrex, AFC.
- W. H. Hutton.
- H. D. Jackman.
- L. E. Jarman, DFC.
- R. B. Jordan, DFC.
- W. M. L. Macdonald, DFC.
- E. P. Mackay.
- A. McKee, DSO, DFC, AFC.
- L. Martin, AFC.
- H. L. Messiter.
- F. E. Nuttall, OBE.
- C. T. O'Neill, OBE.
- G. R. O'Sullivan.
- H. W. Pearson-Rogers.
- T. G. Pike, DFC.
- A. P. Revington, OBE.
- P. D. Robertson, AM.
- F. G. A. Robinson, DFC.
- B. H. C. Russell.
- J. A. C. Stratton.
- L. Taylor.
- The Rev. H. Thomas.
- T. C. Traill, OBE, DFC.
- J. B. M. Wallis, OBE.
- J. R. Whitley, AFC, (since missing).
- B. C. Yarde.
- J. G. Argles (Acting).
- B. H. Ashton (Acting).
- W. J. S. Barnard, OBE, (Acting).
- J. F. Hobler (Acting).
- G. T. Jarman, DSO, DFC, (Acting).
- R. C. Jordan (Acting).
- R. H. A. Leigh (Acting).
- K. P. Lewis (Acting).
- C. A. Loughhead, OBE, (Acting).
- J. C. Millar (Acting).
- J. D. Miller (Acting).
- M. W. Nolan (Acting).
- C. J. S. O'Malley, MB, BS, MRCS, LRCP, (Acting).
- F. A. Pearce, OBE, (Acting).
- J. R. A. Peel, DFC, (Acting).
- W. E. V. Richards (Acting).
- C. Ryley, DFC, (Acting).
- H. V. Satterly, DFC, (Acting).
- W. C. Sheen, DSO, (Acting).
- H. M. White (Acting), RAFVR.
- C. R. Slemon, Royal Canadian Air Force.
- Colonel H. Hingeston, South African Air Force.

Wing Commanders

- L. H. Anderson (29030).
- C. E. Aston (11104).
- C. E. J. Baines (26152).
- J. W. Bayley, MBE, (33155)
- S. W. Birch (35024).
- G. Blinman (21118).
- D. H. Brinton (72571), RAFVR.
- D. S. Brookes (17155).
- R. B. Brown (21051).
- G. C. Butler (24198), RAFO.
- F. H. Cashmore (13178).
- G. Clapham, AFC, (70128), RAFO.
- H. I. Clapperton, LDS, (23100), RAFO.
- D. de B. Clark (90086), AAF.
- L. J. Crosbie (29064).
- H. I. Dabinett (29004).
- L. D. Dadswell,(36049).
- R. B. Dashpur (26156).
- W. R. Donkin (11244).
- J. F. H. du Boulay, DFC, (33025).
- J. W. Duggan (22161).
- J. N. W. Farmer, DFC, (37316).
- E. H. Free (31057).
- L. Freeman (23026).
- P. S. Gomez (26231).
- J. Greenhalgh (37168).
- R. L. M. Hall (21177).
- R. W. Hase (37229).
- L. E. A. Healy, OBE, (90205), AAF.
- P. Heath (26136).
- I. Hodgson (13222).
- H. V. Hoskins (37076).
- J. P. Huins, OBE, BCh, MRCS, LRCP, (90259), AAF.
- D. F. D. G. Kelly (33168).
- W. H. King (35034).
- E. J. A. Knight (35027).
- G. V. Lane, DFC, AFC, (37602), RAFVR.
- J. H. Lapsley, DFC, (33320).
- G. M. Lindeman, DFC, (37302).
- T. C. Macdonald, AFC, MD, ChB, (23147).
- B. J. McGinn (29042), RAFVR.
- J. R. Maclachlan (36005).
- N. W. D. Marwood-Elton, DFC, (34006).
- J. D. Melvin (33170).
- W. D. J. Michie (24150).
- C. H. Mitchell (34244).
- E. M. Morris (28206), RAFVR.
- W. E. H. Muir, MC, (74930), RAFVR.
- R. L. Phillips (26120).
- G. T. Richardson (04190).
- T. U. Rolfe (33013).
- The Rev. R. N. Shapley, MC, (38029).
- D. G. Simmons (36077).
- N. F. Simpson (36033).
- E. Smith (11098).
- P. K. Stead (90306), AAF.
- P. Stevens, DFC, (37054).
- J. H. Styles (35071).
- W. G. Swanborough, MBE, (35008).
- R. Thorpe, MRCS, LRCP, (23041).
- J. K. Tough (35036).
- B. D. S. Tuke (03085), RAFVR.
- N. W. Wakelin (32211).
- J. H. Williams, MRCS, LRCP, (90144), AAF.
- O. S. M. Williams, MRCS, LRCP, DA.(23132).
- F. Wilmshurst, DSM, (35009).
- W. C. F. A. Wilson, OBE, (76354), RAFVR.
- S. C. Wyatt (11107).
- A. W. Alberry, MBE, (35217) (Acting).
- L. Cohen, DSO, MC, (72629) (Acting), RAFVR.
- R. W. Cox, DFC, (43145) (Acting).
- J. R. Cree, DFC, (39275) (Acting), RAFVR.
- A. E. Crouchley (76376) (Acting), RAFVR.
- P. H. Dorte (74260) (Acting), RAFVR.
- R. W. Durand, MRCS, LRCP, (72455) (Acting), RAFVR.
- T. H. E. Edwards (75516) (Acting), RAFVR.
- H. Eltherington (91210) (Acting), AAF.
- W. R. Ford (31083) (Acting).
- M. G. L. Foster (90007) (Acting), AAF.
- W. B. Frampton (84143) (Acting), RAFVR.
- E. L. Fuller (75320) (Acting), RAFVR.
- L. E. Giles, DFC, (42213) (Acting), RAFO.
- M. J. Grennan (35170) (Acting).
- E. J. G. Hill (43859) (Acting).
- J. H. Hodge (90179) (Acting), AAF.
- S. P. F. Humphreys-Owen (76353) (Acting), RAFVR.
- R. Johnstone, MC, (73644) (Acting), RAFVR.
- C. E. Jones (74146) (Acting), RAFVR.
- W. E. Knowlden (05122) (Acting).
- G. K. Lawrence, DFC, (70387) (Acting).
- P. W. Loveday (77751) (Acting), RAFVR.
- W. J. Maggs (31232) (Acting).
- H. J. W. Meakin, DFC, (83280) (Acting), RAFVR.
- S. W. B. Menaul, DFC, AFC, (33272) (Acting).
- W. M. Morris, DFC, (70476) (Acting), RAFO.
- A. L. Mortimer (22201) (Acting).
- H. Myles, AFM, (35085) (Acting).
- A. W. Oldroyd, DFC, AFC, (37889) (Acting) RAFO.
- E. S. Osborn (08022) (Acting).
- T. U. Polutt, OBE, (35278) (Acting).
- The Rev. A. J. Potts (38036) (Acting).
- D. F. Rixon, DFC, (39393) (Acting), RAFVR.
- J. Roncoroni (37546) (Acting), RAFO.
- J. B. Schofield (87135) (Acting), RAFVR.
- A. A. D. Sevastopulo (75549) (Acting), RAFVR.
- E. W. Seward (88889) (Acting), RAFVR.
- C. A. Shute, CMG, CBE, (72936) (Acting), RAFVR.
- R. A. Smith (73724) (Acting), RAFVR.
- D. F. Spotswood, DFC, (37733) (Acting).
- D. C. Stapleton, DFC, AFC, (37948) (Acting) RAFO.
- A. M. Taylor, DFC, (77612) (Acting), RAFVR.
- F. J. Taylor (24046) (Acting), RAFO.
- F. W. Thompson, DFC, (60758) (Acting), RAFVR.
- P. H. Thompson (72244) (Acting), RAFVR.
- C. Tompkins, AFM, (43497) (Acting).
- S. O. Tudor, DFC, (70685) (Acting).
- E. A. Warfeld, DFC, (37991) (Acting), RAFO.
- J. S. Wilson, MB, ChB, (23167) (Acting).
- H. C. Witts (35187) (Acting).
- Lieutenant-Colonel E. A. Biden, South African Air Force.

Squadron Leaders

- The Rev. E. G. Alsop (38102).
- E. Andrew, MC, (75437), RAFVR.
- The Rev. A. Attard (67565), RAFVR.
- F. H. P. Austin (45043).
- H. C. Bailey (40067).
- H. S. Barber, MD, BCh, FRCP(L), (23151).
- A. W. Bennett (80958), RAFVR.
- H. Birchall (72530), RAFVR.
- J. E. Bonham (75327), RAFVR.
- A. H. Button (05178), RAFVR.
- The Rev. G. E. Carruth (113930), RAFVR.
- The Rev. W. E. Clarke (63061), RAFVR.
- The Rev. R. R. Clements (81872), RAFVR.
- R. H. Collen (72320), RAFVR.
- H. T. H. Copeland (10076).
- K. M. Crick (21226).
- A. J. Croft-Cohen (77445), RAFVR.
- A. I. S. Debenham (70167), RAFVR.
- C. J. Dickinson (75191), RAFVR.
- The Rev. J. E. Dixon, MC, (76546), RAFVR.
- A. J. Douch (72502), RAFVR.
- P. S. Dundas (21235).
- H. P. Eustace (74856), RAFVR.
- D. G. Evans, MB, ChB, MB, BS, (72108), RAFVR.
- W. A. S. Falla (72007), RAFVR.
- P. J. Faulkner (114740), RAFVR.
- R. E. Fearn (72512), RAFVR.
- F. J. W. Firth (76176), RAFVR.
- The Rev. J. Fisher (61910), RAFVR.
- J. Fleming (36195).
- T. C. Garden (90222), AAF.
- The Rev. A. C. Gates (38049), RAFO.
- The Rev. J. Gill (89286), RAFVR.
- W. Grech (76039), RAFVR.
- R. T. Halliwell (17127).
- H. W. C. Hannaford (43612).
- E. A. D. Heath (80622), RAFVR.
- P. A. Heppell (44902).
- J. P. Hinks (13195), RAFVR.
- J. M. Horsley (91006), AAF.
- G. R. V. Hume-Gore, MC.
- B. I. Jones, DSO, MC, (76174), RAFVR.
- D. L. Kings (72222), RAFVR.
- H. R. Kirkman (70369), RAFO.
- T. R. Laws (44012).
- J. Macaldowie (90480), AAF.
- G. F. McIvor (90489), AAF.
- The Rev. C. A. Madden (61915), RAFVR.
- A. F. Marlowe (70444), RAFO.
- R. B. Martyn, MC, (72702), RAFVR.
- W. L. Mills (35359).
- A. J. Morris (82923), RAFVR.
- L. R. Mumby (31235).
- L. D. Neeves (72270), RAFVR.
- C. D. Palmer (05077).
- G. H. M. Pirie (33332).
- K. B. Redmond, MB, BS, (23385).
- F. V. M. Rich (21256).
- H. J. Riddle (90141), AAF.
- The Rev. E. W. Robotham (38058).
- J. Ross (41134), RAFO.
- R. D. I. Scott (21275).
- H. W. Seear (21245).
- W. H. Shaw (40146).
- E. J. Smart (90406), AAF.
- D. Stevenson (77900), RAFVR.
- C. C. Thurrell (70677), RAFO.
- W. E. Tollworthy (77060), RAFVR.
- E. C. C. Tomkins, DFC, (39910), RAFVR.
- W.Townson (37072).
- R. W. Tyler (72411), RAFVR.
- D. G. Warren (37369), RAFO.
- W. L. Whitlock (74855), RAFVR.
- J. H. Williams (84800), RAFVR.
- D. E. Willington (84447), RAFVR.
- J. A. Willoughby (75841), RAFVR.
- A. Wilson (72347), RAFVR.
- The Rev. H.T Yeomans (77974), RAFVR.
- A. D.Adams (46271) (Acting).
- F. F. Addington (78442) (Acting), RAFVR.
- J. C. Allan (75920) (Acting), RAFVR.
- E. W. Anderson (83847) (Acting), RAFVR.
- I. F. Anderson (60153) (Acting), RAFVR.
- R. H. Annan (60282) (Acting), RAFVR.
- J. E. Archbald,(74409) (Acting), RAFVR.
- J. P. Armitage (77256) (Acting), RAFVR.
- H. Atkinson (68920) (Acting), RAFVR.
- S. Ault (42295) (Acting).
- M. C. Badcock (79105) (Acting), RAFVR.
- J. A. C. Baker-Harber (79840) (Acting), RAFVR.
- H. Barratt-Atkin (46323) (Acting).
- J. Barry (83489) (Acting), RAFVR.
- H. D. Benham (74424) (Acting), RAFVR.
- E. S. Benson (81815) (Acting), RAFVR.
- E. S. Bishop (43518) (Acting).
- R. S. P. Boby (15157) (Acting), RAFVR.
- P. H. de K. Bocock (42256) (Acting).
- H. H. Bootle (43998) (Acting).
- F. H. Bowden, DFC, (89593) (Acting), RAFVR.
- J. D. Bowen (43315) (Acting).
- J. D. Bowman (73853) (Acting), RAFVR.
- W. Bradshaw, DFC, (43413) (Acting).
- R. G. Brickell (77628) (Acting), RAFVR.
- A. W. Bridger (31118) (Acting).
- E. F. Briggs (73857) (Acting), RAFVR.
- P. M. Brooks (75894) (Acting), RAFVR.
- J. L. Brown, MBE, (74440) (Acting), RAFVR.
- P. Brown (43498) (Acting).
- R. H. Budworh (73508) (Acting), RAFVR.
- P. C. Bullock (112383) (Acting), RAFVR.
- C. T. Burridge (35220) (Acting).
- S. W. Byrne (82893) (Acting), RAFVR.
- C. C. Calder, DFC, (62699) (Acting), RAFVR.
- T. C. Caldow (43515) (Acting).
- E. F. K. Campling, DFC, (42049) (Acting).
- H. H. M. Carpenter (81799) (Acting), RAFVR.
- C. D. Clark (87176) (Acting), RAFVR.
- T. C. Clayson (78899) (Acting), RAFVR.
- E. S. Cohn (60896) (Acting), RAFVR.
- J. T. O. Collins (43212) (Acting).
- S. Conway (43208) (Acting).
- R. K. Cooke (61608) (Acting), RAFVR.
- A. F. J. Copson (75917) (Acting), RAFVR.
- P. T. Cotton, DFC, (89762) (Acting), RAFVR.
- G. R. Cowdrey (43768) (Acting).
- E. K. Creswell, DFC, (107461) (Acting), RAFVR.
- H. R. Crowley (42971) (Acting).
- C. W. A. Davies (43506) (Acting).
- D. F. E. C. Dean, DFC, (42997) (Acting).
- J. T. Denman (74474) (Acting), RAFVR.
- P. C. W. Disney (70183) (Acting), RAFO.
- F. O. S. Dobell (75407) (Acting), RAFVR.
- P. Dobson, DFC, (64284) (Acting), RAFVR.
- Mrs. A. L. J. Dovey, MB, ChB.
- W. E. B. Dowling (60351) (Acting), RAFVR.
- H. Dribbell (44353) (Acting).
- H. H. Drummond, DFM, (112544) (Acting), RAFVR.
- D. H. Duder, DFC, (70192) (Acting).
- R. A. Esler, DFC, (85012) (Acting), RAFVR.
- H. V. W. Evans (44027) (Acting).
- W. G. Evans (44153) (Acting).
- L. H. Farbrother (90909) (Acting), AAF.
- B. Fellows (23428) (Acting).
- A. C. Flavell (76281) (Acting), RAFVR.
- H. C. Flemons (76312) (Acting), RAFVR.
- J. D. R. Forbes (43630) (Acting).
- R. G. D. Forward (75566) (Acting), RAFVR.
- F. L. Fox (87863) (Acting), RAFVR.
- T. Fox (43220) (Acting).
- J. T. Freeman (43418) (Acting).
- E. Garland (90906) (Acting), AAF.
- J. M. Garlick, DFC, (45425) (Acting).
- W. N. Gibson, MBE, (45216) (Acting).
- V. A. Gittins, MBE, (44208) (Acting).
- E. F. Goater (45172) (Acting).
- G. J. Goldstone (45695) (Acting).
- P. S. Gooda (80731) (Acting), RAFVR.
- P. Goode (62010) (Acting), RAFVR (since missing).
- G. D. L. Goslett (82473) (Acting), RAFVR.
- D. H. Grice, DFC, (40534) (Acting), RAFO.
- R. G. Griffiths (83959), (Acting), RAFVR.
- V. G. Grylls, DFC, (79172) (Acting) RAFVR.
- B. J. Guest (77713) (Acting), RAFVR.
- A. A. Halley (79160) (Acting), RAFVR.
- A. Hamilton (43864) (Acting).
- E. S. Harman (81767) (Acting), RAFVR.
- R. Harris (21285) (Acting).
- M. R. Haseler (83151) (Acting), RAFVR.
- E. M. M. Henderson (76113) (Acting), RAFVR.
- L. Henshall, MBE, (73226) (Acting), RAFVR.
- W. S. Herring, DSO, DFM, (44709) (Acting).
- A. H. Hewitt (40391).
- T. E. J. Hewitt (73228) (Acting), RAFVR.
- C. M. Hill (36172) (Acting).
- E. F. Hine (100134) (Acting), RAFVR.
- F. R. Hockney (76075) (Acting), RAFVR
- P. J. Hooper (44392) (Acting).
- W. Hopkins-Jones (79136) (Acting), RAFVR.
- J. E. Horton, MBE, (35268) (Acting).
- A. S. Hughes (43502) (Acting).
- R. E. Hunter, DFC, (40540) (Acting).
- K. O. G. Huntley (79387) (Acting), RAFVR.
- C. F. Ingle (86547) (Acting), RAFVR.
- R. I. H. Isdell-Carpenter (83801) (Acting), RAFVR.
- D. Iveson, DFC, (86384) (Acting), RAFVR.
- R. A. Jell (64283) (Acting), RAFVR.
- G. D. Jenkins (77649) (Acting), RAFVR.
- G. E. Johnson (72560) (Acting), RAFVR.
- S. B. Johnson (78494) (Acting), RAFVR.
- A. Le B. Johnston (76368) (Acting).
- W. J. H. Jones (80877) (Acting), RAFVR.
- G. D. F. Keddie (76986) (Acting), RAFVR.
- S. E. Kellaway (43448) (Acting).
- H. S. King (45821) (Acting).
- R. G. S. King (88880) (Acting), RAFVR
- Baron Kinross (83443) (Acting), RAFVR.
- R. E. Kirkby, DFC, (42613) (Acting).
- J. H. Kirton (41771) (Acting), RAFO.
- F. T. Kitchin (84113) (Acting), RAFVR.
- R. F. P. Landon (79850) (Acting), RAFVR.
- W. I. Lashbrooke, DFM, (45895) (Acting) (since missing).
- R. C. Lawes (77513) (Acting), RAFVR.
- D. Leatherland (85674) (Acting), RAFVR.
- H. Lee (43858) (Acting).
- H. L. Leedham-Green (88284) (Acting) RAFVR.
- A. Leeming (46472) (Acting).
- L. B. P. Leeson (43879) (Acting).
- R. J. A. Leslie (36255) (Acting).
- C. Longstaff (45030) (Acting).
- H. H. Loveday (87491) (Acting), RAFVR.
- R. F. Lucy (44009) (Acting).
- R. Macfarlane, DFC, (111222) (Acting), RAFVR.
- J. B. McGinn, MBE, (46263) (Acting).
- T. C. McIlroy (74175) (Acting), RAFVR.
- A. Macnicol (82893) (Acting), RAFVR.
- K. G. Major (44209) (Acting).
- N. R. Mansfield (43707) (Acting).
- A. Matthews (35327) (Acting).
- G. Mawer (75540) (Acting), RAFVR.
- H. W. Merckel (86168) (Acting), RAFVR.
- L. W. Millett (85694) (Acting), RAFVR.
- W. B. Moon (86219) (Acting), RAFVR.
- H. L. R. Morgan (88988) (Acting), RAFVR.
- L. Morgan (44893) (Acting).
- H. M. Morris, DFC, (72705) (Acting), RAFVR.
- R. K. Morris, MC, (76975) (Acting), RAFVR.
- C. H. Muggeridge (65507) (Acting), RAFVR.
- J. J. Mumford (83773) (Acting), RAFVR.
- A. H. F. Murphy (43771) (Acting).
- F. G. S. Musson (73311) (Acting), RAFVR.
- N. C. G. Newnham (43743) (Acting).
- L. F. Odell (84161) (Acting), RAFVR.
- A. J. Ogilvie, DFC, (42427) (Acting).
- J. G. Ogilvie (61544) (Acting), RAFVR.
- S. R. Painter (83149) (Acting), RAFVR.
- G. D. Park (74761) (Acting), RAFVR.
- J. A. Payne (77990) (Acting), RAFVR.
- E. F. Pearce (35321) (Acting).
- R. H. Pilcher (79319) (Acting), RAFVR.
- F. C. Pope (43881) (Acting).
- G. A. C. Potts, DFC, (43943) (Acting).
- J. E. Proctor, DFC, (44131) (Acting).
- R. W. Pye (33517) (Acting).
- R. J. Raphael (43476) (Acting).
- J. Raeside (35295) (Acting).
- C. W. N. Raymond (73361) (Acting), RAFVR.
- G. B. Read (77209) (Acting), RAFVR.
- D. A. Rix (46130) (Acting).
- C. A. Robinson (78894) (Acting), RAFVR.
- G. Robinson (31303) (Acting).
- E. W. Rogers (87122) (Acting), RAFVR.
- H. H. Rose (77739) (Acting), RAFVR.
- I. S. C. Rose (102304) (Acting), RAFVR.
- H. S. Rowland (78634) (Acting), RAFVR.
- W. D. B. Ruth, DFC, (33397) (Acting).
- L. H. Sagar (90320) (Acting), AAF.
- J. Sanderson (76121) (Acting), RAFVR.
- J. P. Saul (87007) (Acting), RAFVR.
- A. D. Saunders (111991) (Acting), RAFVR.
- E. M. Saunders (80007) (Acting), RAFVR.
- E. T. Scott (70609) (Acting), RAFO.
- W. P. Scott (44795) (Acting).
- J. P. Seabourne (42894) (Acting).
- H. Seymour (83454) (Acting), RAFVR.
- M. H. Shekleton (78456) (Acting), RAFVR.
- W. J. R. Shepherd (100575) (Acting), RAFVR.
- E. H. Sillince (44085) (Acting).
- A. B. Smith, DFC, (64917) (Acting), RAFVR.
- F. V. Smith (79818) (Acting), RAFVR.
- D. Stafford-Clark, MB, BS, MRCS, LRCP, (77094) (Acting), RAFVR.
- J. E. Storrar, DFC, (41881) (Acting).
- L. H. Styles (44882) (Acting).
- H. L. R. Summers (100780) (Acting), RAFVR.
- R. L. S. Swanton (80971) (Acting), RAFVR.
- E. B. Symonds (45995) (Acting).
- B. H. Thomas (46302) (Acting).
- J. R. Thompson (85197) (Acting), RAFVR.
- S. L. Thomson (82031) (Acting), RAFVR.
- R. T. R. Thornhill (73433) (Acting), RAFVR.
- H. R. Tucker (44437) (Acting).
- H. L. Tudor (76532) (Acting), RAFVR.
- H. Waite (35378) (Acting).
- T. K. Waite (82101) (Acting), RAFVR.
- G. E. Walker (44898) (Acting).
- J. K. R. Walker (87842) (Acting), RAFVR.
- H. Walters, MBE, (35379) (Acting).
- G. A. Watt, DFC, (43933) (Acting).
- R. Watts-Jones (88093) (Acting), RAFVR.
- J. H. Weaver (78180) (Acting), RAFVR.
- G. W. A. Webb (73473) (Acting), RAFVR.
- H. L. Whitlock (35381) (Acting).
- C. J. Williams (44620) (Acting).
- W. Wilson (76091) (Acting), RAFVR.
- R. Winship (78559) (Acting), RAFVR.
- E. Wood (45097) (Acting).
- H. I. Wood (79769) (Acting), RAFVR.
- G. F. Yuill (70767) (Acting), RAFO.

Royal Australian Air Force

- E. Paul (Aus.402079) (Acting).
- J. B. Walker (Aus.1563) (Acting).

Royal Canadian Air Force

- D. D. Millar (Can/C.3576) (Acting).
- T. E. Pilkington (Can/J.5320) (Acting).
- R. S. Turnbull, DFM, (Can/J.15054) (Acting).

Royal New Zealand Air Force

- F. J. Steel, DFC, (N.Z.391370).
- P. J. Lamason, DFC, (N.Z.403460) (Acting)
- B. W. Nicholson (N.Z.407195) (Acting).
- S. D. Watts (N.Z.404008) (Acting).

South African Air Force

Major

- A. R. Booth (1015000).
- J. H. R. Eastwood (53337).
- G. N. McBlain (202984).
- F. W. Spencer (203160) (since deceased).
- A. J. Van Ginkel (102704).
- E. B. Woodrow (102004).

Flight Lieutenants

- T. W. A. Allen (47520).
- C. A. MacD. Anderson (60158), RAFVR.
- C. A. E. Andrews (79853), RAFVR.
- R. I. Armstrong (42687).
- F. L. Ashley (88755), RAFVR.
- A. N. Banks (79025), RAFVR.
- C. E. Barlow, RAFO.
- R. Beeching (87810), RAFVR.
- J. B. Bell (69993), RAFVR.
- E. R. Bolton (46262).
- P. Boulton, DFC, (74434), RAFVR.
- B. F. Boyles (85407), RAFVR.
- B. S. Bridges (83510), RAFVR.
- A. T. Bristow (83512), RAFVR.
- T. H. Brooks (47006).
- O. T. Brown (100467), RAFVR.
- P. L. Burley (88270), RAFVR.
- J. H. Cater (86675), RAFVR.
- J. G. Chandler (83621), RAFVR.
- G. A. Chapman (77624), RAFVR.
- V. J. Chipperfield (77578), RAFVR.
- H. C. J. L. Connelly (44283).
- F. Davies (75596), RAFVR.
- H. F. Davis (44840).
- W. Dixon (86929), RAFVR.
- W. E. Bowling (77830), RAFVR.
- K. B. Bring, MBE, (45103).
- P. J. Bunlop (45247).
- J. M. O. Byer (33564).
- R. H. Edwards (42113) (deceased).
- W. P. Elliott (83541), RAFVR.
- H. R. Ellis (44425).
- J. E. S. Elwell (82142), RAFVR.
- H. J. C. Elwig (86930), RAFVR.
- J. H. Emerson, MM, (88103), RAFVR.
- N. G. Farrell (89038), RAFVR.
- P. Feighan (44105).
- V. B. Fletcher (88518), RAFVR.
- C. H. P. Florence (86014), RAFVR.
- H. W. Ford (43905).
- R. L. Ford (88771), RAFVR.
- T. J. Gilbert (88278), RAFVR.
- C. R. Glen (42704).
- E. G. R. Godfrey (61124), RAFVR.
- L. M. Gower (84769), RAFVR.
- S. J. Hargrave (44217).
- B. C. Harrison (81541), RAFVR.
- T. Hepburn, MB, ChB, (64848), RAFVR.
- C. S. Herbert (132215), RAFO.
- C. R. Higgins (104871).
- J. L. W. Hodgson (60186), RAFVR.
- A. Houghton (44325).
- R. P. S. Hubbard (82859), RAFVR.
- H. Hudson, MBE, (44008).
- F. K. Humphreys (84673), RAFVR.
- J. P. Humphries (81299), RAFVR.
- C. G. Jackson (45787).
- E. A. Keable (47548).
- P. M. Kelly (121382), RAFVR.
- L. B. Kingsbury (78406), RAFVR.
- J. S. Lamplough (60308), RAFVR.
- S. G. Lloyd (81081), RAFVR.
- C. W. Lovatt (31230).
- B. P. Lund (81573), RAFVR.
- J. O. Lupton (103855), RAFVR.
- R. S. Lymbery (82772), RAFVR.
- R. W. P. McFarland, DFM, (45150).
- F. D. Maclean (88571), RAFVR.
- R. G. Macleod (80833), RAFVR.
- M. G. McNama (45657).
- J. Makepeace (45521).
- R. F. Martin, DFC, (33439).
- C. H. Mears (84625), RAFVR.
- B. C. Meiklereid (85700), RAFVR.
- C. J. Millward (79765), RAFVR.
- J. Milton (79944), RAFVR.
- R. A. E. Milton (42866).
- T. J. Molony (74185), RAFVR.
- J. L. Morgan, MB, ChB, (60982), RAFVR.
- R. T. Morison (82413), RAFVR.
- G. P. Morley (79946), RAFVR
- C. J. Myers (82193), RAFVR.
- P. J. Nankivell (89430), RAFVR (since missing).
- H. Newell (79954), RAFVR.
- J. B. Nicholson (86170), RAFVR.
- G. North (83719), RAFVR (deceased).
- I. D. Oliver, DFC, (84308), RAFVR.
- W. D. M. Owen (85575), RAFVR.
- R. V. Palmer (87117), RAFVR.
- F. M. Partington (78056), RAFVR.
- C. R. Payne (81833), RAFVR.
- L. W. Peart, MBE, (48270).
- D. W. Peck, DFC, (42430).
- R. P. Priest (41802).
- F. E. A. Quinn (84721), RAFVR.
- E. J. Ralli (61069), RAFVR.
- A. M. R. Ramsden (44728).
- D. G. H. Rance (63774), RAFVR.
- J. Ree (76962), RAFVR.
- N. G. Reeves (79975), RAFVR.
- E. A. Reilly (74389), RAFVR.
- L. J. Richardson (46062).
- N. Roberts (84628), RAFVR.
- G. M. Robertson (82238), RAFVR.
- D. H. Robinson (83433), RAFVR.
- J. H. B. Rollett (85229), RAFVR.
- R. H. Rose (81652), RAFVR.
- A. Russell (84839), RAFVR.
- J. McC Russell (85582), RAFVR.
- B. Schneider (87292), RAFVR.
- H. W. Scott (77229), RAFVR.
- E. A. A. Shackleton (83413), RAFVR.
- H. W. Simpson (86234), RAFVR.
- E. G. Slaney (45408).
- G. H. S. Smith (100587), RAFVR.
- H. J. Smith (83019), RAFVR.
- W. E. Speirs (88579), RAFVR.
- W. D. Tennant (68902), RAFVR.
- T. Ure (82099), RAFVR.
- L. L. N. Vinall (84349), RAFVR.
- N. E. H. Virgin (40961).
- A. Walsham (86942), RAFVR.
- R. Wareing, DFC, (86325), RAFVR.
- C. R. Watson (83905), RAFVR.
- T. Welham (60181), RAFVR.
- E. L. West (42926).
- D. L. O'G. Whitfield (89888), RAFVR.
- O. M. Williams (81151), RAFVR.
- H. Wilson (44320).
- M. M. F. Wingate (82310), RAFVR.
- W. D. Wisker (86936), RAFVR.
- W. F. Adams (46190) (Acting).
- J. F. Addington (63875) (Acting), RAFVR
- C. Aldridge (44282) (Acting).
- K. R. Ash (69358) (Acting), RAFVR.
- R. A. Aston (89264) (Acting), RAFVR.
- T. Atkinson (117559) (Acting), RAFVR.
- R. H. Avis (112030) (Acting), RAFVR.
- R. W. Baird (108895) (Acting), RAFVR.
- R. F. Bannister (120976) (Acting), RAFVR.
- H. Barritt (115663) (Acting), RAFVR.
- G. T. Bartlett (63485) (Acting), RAFVR
- R. F. Bateman (66066) (Acting), RAFVR
- C. A. Baxter (46792) (Acting).
- G. R. H. Beresford (107866) (Acting), RAFVR.
- E. N. Beswick (47924) (Acting).
- G. A. Betham (100748) (Acting), RAFVR.
- J. B. W. Birks, DFC, (115144) (Acting), RAFVR.
- J. H. Bourne (72020) (Acting), RAFVR.
- C. T. H. Bradshaw (63924) (Acting), RAFVR.
- N. W. Bradshaw (74814) (Acting), RAFVR.
- W. C. Brennan (46040) (Acting).
- H. C. Brett (88931) (Acting), RAFVR.
- S. G. Briden (43649) (Acting).
- H. M. Briscoe (89851) (Acting), RAFVR.
- H. C. Brooker (46238) (Acting).
- P. Bunclark, DFM, (117580) (Acting), RAFVR.
- G. Burke (48765) (Acting).
- W. S. Callander (110666) (Acting), RAFVR.
- N. Cameron (102585) (Acting), RAFVR.
- I. O. B. Carlson (104104) (Acting), RAFVR.
- H. J. Carter, DFC, (104474) (Acting), RAFVR.
- C. E. Castle (46461) (Acting).
- R. E. G. Checketts (47927) (Acting).
- C. H. Cobbold (47384) (Acting).
- G. D. Cooper (47600) (Acting).
- J. A. Cope (100753) (Acting), RAFVR.
- E. A. Costello-Bowen (46332) (Acting).
- E. W. Cotton (46498) (Acting).
- G. L. Coutts (84158) (Acting), RAFVR.
- D. Cramp (113332) (Acting), RAFVR.
- W. Crighton-Brown (61099) (Acting), RAFVR.
- R. C. Crosbie (46633) (Acting).
- E. T. Crumpton (46004) (Acting).
- R. M. Cunningham (103707) (Acting), RAFVR.
- T. Dale (106156) (Acting), RAFVR.
- E. Daniels (64962) (Acting), RAFVR.
- D. R. Davies (46893) (Acting).
- H. G. Dawe (109700) (Acting), RAFVR.
- E. W. Dawson (60189) (Acting), RAFVR.
- H. C. Daynes (61318) (Acting), RAFVR.
- E. F. Dealing, MC, MM, (84072) (Acting), RAFVR.
- M. H. Disney (62737) (Acting), RAFVR.
- K. I. Dodds (100192) (Acting), RAFVR.
- C. H. C. Down (48055) (Acting).
- L. A. Dwen (122987) (Acting), RAFVR.
- E. W. Eagleton (105422) (Acting), RAFVR.
- J. B. Earnshaw (105887) (Acting), RAFVR.
- G. H. Earp (45319) (Acting).
- W. G. Eason (103606) (Acting), RAFVR.
- L. C. Elliott (46426) (Acting).
- F. E. P. Farrow (47330) (Acting).
- A. Firth (46646) (Acting).
- R. G. Fisher (68941) (Acting), RAFVR.
- B. Flannery (47093) (Acting).
- P. S. Gage (47673) (Acting).
- B. H. Gallatley (89757) (Acting), RAFVR.
- G. Garvock (48192) (Acting).
- D. E. Gibbs (45383) (Acting).
- G. R. Gibbs (67724) (Acting), RAFVR.
- H. B. Gibson (66628) (Acting), RAFVR.
- J. W. Gibson (102697) (Acting), RAFVR.
- J. Gilbert (85795) (Acting), RAFVR.
- A. W. Gillmore (47662) (Acting).
- C. C. Glover (83878) (Acting), RAFVR.
- P. R. Goodwin (100622) (Acting), RAFVR.
- M. S. Hall (117616) (Acting), RAFVR.
- G. W. Hancock (47799) (Acting).
- R. L. Hanson, DFC, (88666) (Acting), RAFVR.
- T. O. Harker (60209) (Acting), RAFVR.
- A. R. Hart (79413) (Acting), RAFVR.
- J. W. H. Harwood (126025) (Acting), RAFVR.
- W. Hawken (48576) (Acting).
- B. J. L. Heal (86857) (Acting), RAFVR.
- A. J. Heyworth, DFC, (63841) (Acting), RAFVR.
- V. G. Hobbs (46855) (Acting).
- R. B. Hodgkinson (62063) (Acting), RAFVR.
- S. A. Hogg (89188) (Acting), RAFVR.
- N. D. Humphries (44099) (Acting).
- J. Hunt (61076) (Acting), RAFVR.
- D. L. Ingram (110474) (Acting), RAFVR.
- T. A. James (110111) (Acting), RAFVR.
- J. Jamieson (68075) (Acting), RAFVR.
- R. D. Jeffreys, MC, (66092) (Acting), RAFVR.
- E. D. Johnson (46599) (Acting).
- S. Johnson (46294) Acting).
- V. H. Johnson (104762) (Acting), RAFVR.
- B. H. Jones (62026) (Acting), RAFVR.
- R. C. R. Jones (112168) (Acting), RAFVR.
- W. A. Jordan (86700) (Acting), RAFVR.
- D. H. Keary, DFC, (65995) (Acting), RAFVR.
- W. T. Keates (47526) (Acting).
- R. Kempster (46046) (Acting).
- R. Kinsey (101017) (Acting), RAFVR.
- C. H. Kippen (77534) (Acting), RAFVR.
- R. B. Laurie (109676) (Acting), RAFVR.
- J. L. Law (88780) (Acting), RAFVR. (deceased).
- C. D. Lawson (46731) (Acting).
- R. W. Leaning (81773) (Acting), RAFVR.
- N. L. Letten (42350) (Acting).
- M. Leyshon (103502) (Acting), RAFVR.
- A. S. A. Lines (47239) (Acting).
- H. R. Locke (101687) (Acting), RAFVR.
- A. McL Love (109237) (Acting), RAFVR.
- M. McIntyre (46140) (Acting).
- J. W. Mckelvey (45872) (Acting).
- R. Mclean (100720) (Acting), RAFVR.
- E. H. Maddox (102188) (Acting), RAFVR.
- R. S. Mapp (67519) (Acting), RAFVR.
- F. Marr (105530) (Acting), RAFVR.
- S. J. Marriott (105301) (Acting), RAFVR.
- T. H. Martin (48440) (Acting).
- W. H. Marwood (68325) (Acting), RAFVR.
- T. W. Mills (49104) (Acting).
- H. G. Mitchell (86868) (Acting), RAFVR.
- D. H. A. Moore, DFM, (46081) (Acting).
- R. Moore (65014) (Acting), RAFVR.
- A. C. Morris (89029) (Acting), RAFVR.
- F. J. Mowbray (47257) (Acting).
- F. T. Neal (65648) (Acting), RAFVR.
- G. J. N. Neal (105324) (Acting), RAFVR.
- T. M. Newbigging (78918) (Acting), RAFVR.
- D. H. C. Nixon (48382) (Acting).
- L. C. Nockels (108555) (Acting), RAFVR.
- J. L. Norton (89818) (Acting), RAFVR.
- F. J. O'Connell (46104) (Acting).
- G. J. O'Neill, DFM, (47705) (Acting).
- J. C. Palmes (107424) (Acting), RAFVR.
- F. C. D. Parkinson (88613) (Acting), RAFVR.
- C. Pattison (46044) (Acting).
- A. Pedley (48328) (Acting).
- L. W. Percival, MBE, (46413) (Acting).
- G. Perry (47711) (Acting).
- E. W. Pierce (48678) (Acting).
- J. L. Plant (109261) (Acting), RAFVR.
- H. R. S. Plunkett (61112) (Acting), RAFVR.
- S. W. P. Pooles (104936) (Acting), RAFVR.
- J. W. Potts (123635) (Acting), RAFVR.
- W. Price, MC, (89483) (Acting), RAFVR.
- G. H. Proctor (60769) (Acting), RAFVR.
- D. N. Rabagliati (89256) (Acting), RAFVR.
- G. H. C. Rawley (105575) (Acting), RAFVR.
- H. Rawlinson, DFC, (101074), (Acting), RAFVR.
- P. W. Reading (104558) (Acting), RAFVR
- F. H. Reed (47026) (Acting).
- C. W. A. Reeve (110023) (Acting), RAFVR.
- W. F. Reid (101194) (Acting), RAFVR.
- R. Riley (85083) (Acting), RAFVR.
- H. O. Roberts (69553) (Acting), RAFVR
- J. F. Roberts (67217) (Acting), RAFVR.
- F. H. V. Robinson (62728) (Acting), RAFVR.
- T. S. Robinson (60600) (Acting), RAFVR.
- E. A. Rodway (69527) (Acting), RAFVR.
- A. A. Roisseter (46279) (Acting).
- W. D. Rooney (112551) (Acting), RAFVR.
- J. F. Rothwell (88572) (Acting), RAFVR.
- F. G. Ryan (46801) (Acting).
- R. E. Salvesen (87748) (Acting), RAFVR.
- E. Sanderson (102108) (Acting), RAFVR.
- H. J. Scott-Browne (45519) (Acting).
- A. W. Scriven (102726) (Acting), RAFVR.
- N. S. Sellers (68833) (Acting), RAFVR.
- W. W. Sharp (47160) (Acting).
- W. E. Sheil (49171) (Acting).
- C. R. Shepherd (46651) (Acting).
- W. E. Shepherd (65020) (Acting), RAFVR.
- S. Shield (69606) (Acting), RAFVR.
- J. S. Skelly (120172) (Acting), RAFVR.
- R. C. Smith (68834) (Acting), RAFVR.
- W. C. Smith (48322) (Acting).
- W. J. Smyrk (100177) (Acting), RAFVR.
- E. H. Sneath (85839) (Acting), RAFVR.
- R. M. Snow (62396) (Acting), RAFVR.
- A. A. Spence (63778) (Acting), RAFVR.
- D. R. Squier (63240) (Acting), RAFVR.
- A. M. Stead (116824) (Acting), RAFVR.
- R. Steele (62435) (Acting), RAFVR.
- C. R. Strange (115534) (Acting), RAFVR.
- G. W. Suddes (105964) (Acting), RAFVR.
- E. Sugden (89435) (Acting), RAFVR.
- K. E. Swinfen (104023) (Acting), RAFVR.
- W. W. Swinnerton, DFC, (61252) (Acting), RAFVR.
- G. D. Tabraham (108863) (Acting), RAFVR.
- C. Taylor (110013) (Acting), RAFVR.
- G. E. Terry (60717) (Acting), RAFVR.
- C. F. Tetley (61417) (Acting), RAFVR.
- R. L. Thornton (114976) (Acting), RAFVR.
- T. V. J. Tilney (63981) (Acting), RAFVR.
- R. F. L. Tong, DFC, (63848) (Acting), RAFVR.
- C. S. Tucker (47007) (Acting).
- L. R. Turnham (101727) (Acting), RAFVR.
- A. Wakeford (48247) (Acting).
- J. E. Walden (112174) (Acting), RAFVR.
- L. W. N. Walker (45864) (Acting).
- A. E. Ward (45992) (Acting).
- H. L. Warner (101226) (Acting), RAFVR.
- E. M. Watkins (84825) (Acting), RAFVR.
- S. D. Way (45976) (Acting).
- L. Wells (50211) (Acting).
- D. West (69593) (Acting), RAFVR.
- G. W. Whitbread (46357) (Acting).
- C. T. White (46972) (Acting).
- R. W. White (46276) (Acting).
- M. H. L. Whitehouse (109968) (Acting), RAFVR.
- D. C. Wilkins (101007) (Acting), RAFVR.
- S. J. Wilson (60950) (Acting), RAFVR.
- W. H. Wiltshire (46501) (Acting).
- E. F. Withington (48938) (Acting), RAFO.
- A. Wood (45578) (Acting).
- E. G. W. Wood (66125) (Acting), RAFVR.
- J. E. Wood (46512) (Acting).
- G. Woods, (69360) (Acting), RAFVR.
- J. Woods (103121) (Acting), RAFVR.
- P. C. Wright (45393) (Acting).
- C. L. Yelland (100787) (Acting), RAFVR.
- A. W. Youngs (46053) (Acting).
- L. S. Zylberman (61131) (Acting), RAFVR.

Royal Australian Air Force

- A. J. R. Duffield (Aus.1828).
- C. G. Greeves (Aus.2147).
- S. B. Harry.
- J. N. Morrison (Aus.3020).
- J. E. Pike (Aus.1018)
- H. C. Stone (Aus.1560).
- K. O. Woodward (Aus.1129)
- J. W. Bales (Aus.1928) (Acting)
- J. P. Bartle (Aus.406171) (Acting).
- C. K. Goodwin (Aus.402075) (Acting).
- F. J. Gourlay (Aus.3144) (Acting).
- G. D. Graham (Aus.404910) (Acting)
- D. P. S. Smith (Aus.400495) (Acting).
- A. J. Wilson (Aus.3054) (Acting).

Royal Canadian Air Force

- W. J. C. Macarthur (Can/C.5466).
- J. T. Reed (Can/1646).
- L. F. Austin, DFC, (Can/J.15254) (Acting).
- F. G. Botsford (Can/C7878) (Acting).
- G. H. Gosman (Can/J.15224) (Acting).
- W. Sellar (Can/C.7407) (Acting).
- J. F. Smith (Can/J.209) (Acting).
- J. K. Tett, DFC, (Can/J.15223) (Acting)

Royal New Zealand Air Force

- D. T. V. Henry (N.Z.40200)
- I. O. Breckon (N.Z.40963) (Acting).
- R. B. Spear, DFC, (N.Z.405332) (Acting).

South African Air Force

Captains

- H. D. Barton, DFC, (203428).
- W. R. Bryden (40853).
- D. Duncan (P.94557).
- S. Fuchs (202884).
- E. A. Joseph (P.179837).
- A. W. Klaynhams (P.492).
- R. F. Ohlsson (179847).
- P. L. Polson (47883).
- J. J. Van Der Walt (P.897).
- W. J. Wheeler (P.103839).
- W. Whitford (P.103678) (Acting).

Flying Officers

- H. D. F. Amor (122331) RAFVR (deceased).
- W. J. E. Ardley (65499), RAFVR (missing).
- E. W. Arnott (116142), RAFVR.
- M. C. Bailey (120678), RAFVR.
- F. E. Barnes (49111).
- W. R. Bellamy (106633), RAFVR.
- H. C. Berry (88153), RAFVR.
- S. Blumenthal (87219), RAFVR.
- A. R. Boardman (47644).
- G. K. Boyd, DFC, (125427), RAFVR.
- J. J. Bradley (104674), RAFVR.
- J. O. Bradley (46594).
- N. J. Briant (106371), RAFVR (missing).
- B. Brown (46691).
- T. C. L. Brown (64351), RAFVR.
- R. O. Burgess (119467), RAFVR.
- R. Burnett (119534), RAFVR.
- W. G. Bushill-Matthews (111719), RAFVR.
- A. Caeser-Gordon, DFM, (121089), RAFVR.
- G. F. Camidge (103683), RAFVR.
- M. Carty (109609), RAFVR.
- C. C. Christenson (108916), RAFVR.
- J. A. Clandillon (117778), RAFVR (deceased).
- H. M. G. Clark (105873), RAFVR.
- J. Clark (112069), RAFVR.
- R. G. Clarkson (108353), RAFVR.
- R. D. Collins (120366), RAFVR.
- C. G. Colliver (105225), RAFVR.
- H. J. Crook (46987).
- H. J. Davies (102577), RAFVR.
- P. W. Davies (50277)
- W. G. Davies (128605), RAFVR.
- A. V. Day (61330), RAFVR.
- S. A. Devon (143126) RAFVR.
- R. Duckworth (46047).
- A. V. Earnshaw (61599) RAFVR.
- E. F. Edsall, DFC, (81368), RAFVR (deceased).
- C. W. C. Elsey (109115) RAFVR.
- P. Enderby (126587), RAFVR
- J. R. Falconer-Taylor (112559), RAFVR.
- B. E. Farr (108233), RAFVR.
- L. L. Franks (10439), RAFVR.
- H. S. Gibbs (110461) RAFVR.
- H. P. Gibson (89132), RAFVR
- P. J. Gillespie (106772) RAFVR.
- A. G. W. Gold (47286).
- L. C. Graves (48443)
- H. M. S. Green (63448), RAFVR.
- M. Crew (114586), RAFVR.
- H. J. Griffiths (117180) RAFVR.
- J. Harris (47333).
- A. Hartley (112744), RAFVR.
- G. T. Harvey (80280) RAFVR.
- G. R. Hawes (106557) RAFVR.
- M. C. Head (118018), RAFVR.
- W. H. Herbert (104785), RAFVR
- W. T. Hill (100661) RAFVR.
- R. Hood (48530).
- L. F. Johnson (101775) RAFVR.
- A. W. J. Jolly (116826), RAFVR.
- D. S. Jones (110230), RAFVR.
- H. J. King (109939), RAFVR.
- C. C. Kissner (101107), RAFVR.
- G. H. Lambert (46352).
- J. D. Lampitt (119342), RAFVR.
- T. E. Leader (114362) RAFVR.
- J. Lees (48061)
- M. Levy (126011), RAFVR.
- W. D. Litster, DSO, (128427), RAFVR.
- D. J. McBrien (108811), RAFVR.
- J. L. McCallum (66623), RAFVR.
- M. A. Macdonald (65983), RAFVR.
- J. S. Macfarlane (112355), RAFVR.
- G. R. S. McKay (120741), RAFVR.
- A. R. Middleton (126543), RAFVR.
- S. Milnes (110165), RAFVR.
- E. Mirfin (48966).
- J. R. Mitchell (48859).
- G. P. H. Munro (61141) RAFVR.
- W. H. Newman (47984)
- T. B. Nisbett (111265), RAFVR.
- T. F. P. Nisbet (89354), RAFVR.
- W. R. E. North (114391), RAFVR.
- R. Oswald (118361), RAFVR.
- R. J. Palmer (47844).
- A. F. Pape (113582), RAFVR.
- J. McK Parlane (113227), RAFVR.
- S. Parsons (49202).
- D. A. G. Paterson (89193), RAFVR.
- J. Pickard (46958).
- G. G. Pierce (105261), RAFVR.
- W. T. Poulton (110259), RAFVR.
- F. Pratt (111351) RAFVR.
- E. J. Prince (109652), RAFVR.
- J. R. Pugh (122824), RAFVR.
- P. T. E. Pugson (103021), RAFVR.
- T. C. Rawlinson (112852), RAFVR.
- K. G. Rayment (108000), RAFVR.
- D. N. Riley (120979), RAFVR.
- C. W. Ringrose (108972), RAFVR.
- A. W. Rossiter (106758), RAFVR.
- C. H. Sanderson (47167).
- A. Saxon (103241), RAFVR.
- G. Smith (47217)
- G. C. Speer (48360).
- K. C. Spurway (47343).
- E. H. Symmons (123830), RAFVR.
- C. N. Taylor (106206), RAFVR.
- T. S. W. Towell, DFM, (45544).
- S. Trevallion (114082), RAFVR.
- L. G. L. Turner (112101), RAFVR.
- R. Tweedale (114984), RAFVR.
- I. E. Verstage (46393).
- G. Wallis (47635).
- S. H. Warrilow (44047).
- J. Watson (120614), RAFVR.
- F. K. Wheatley (103120), RAFVR.
- W. E. Wilbur (100546), RAFVR.
- J. D. Wilson (120659), RAFVR.
- R. H. Wood (65565), RAFVR.
- B. G. T. Wormell (48075).
- P. Yorke (105990), RAFVR.

Royal Australian Air Force

- A. J. Abicair, MBE, (Aus.2398).
- J. A. Byrne (Aus.4270).
- L. C. Dorward (Aus.404174) (Missing)
- T. H. Gordon-Glassford (Aus.402658) (since missing).
- L. B. Phillips (Aus.4712).
- N. C. Pottie (Aus.401195).

Royal Canadian Air Force

- H. G. Austin (Can/C8027).
- C. D. R. Chappell (Can/J.4693).
- J. R. Cooper (Can./J.4727).
- C. E. L. Hare (Can/J.15232).
- W. B. Hay (Can/J.5489).
- R. D. McAdam (Can/J.7622).
- C. Massey (Can/J.11113).
- J. K. Reynolds (Can/J.7805).
- A. K. Taylor (Can/C.8111).
- T. R. Vout (Can/C.7880).
- J. H. Watson (Can/J.7802).

Royal New Zealand Air Force

- D. A. Adams (N.Z.41859) (missing).

South African Air Force

Lieutenants

- A. E. L. Ackerman (P.102415).
- A. K. Hunter (99827).
- A. R. Spargo (96776).

Pilot Officers

- P. R. Ackernley (109094), RAFVR (missing).
- W. R. Baggott (113138), RAFVR.
- L. J. Barnes (117126), RAFVR (deceased).
- A. D. Bebbington (141140), RAFVR (missing).
- W. J. Brenton (49990).
- L. G. Butt (131169), RAFVR.
- F. Chapman (128429), RAFVR.
- M. A. Chapman (134746), RAFVR.
- F. J. Day (47743)
- W. J. Day.
- R. B. Dennis (115856), RAFVR.
- W. J. Dunn (47921).
- G. E. C. Genders, DFM, (120165), RAFVR.
- A. F. Goodman (133206), RAFVR.
- R. J. Gritten (129061), RAFVR.
- R. E. Handley, DFM, (137652), RAFVR.
- V. S. Hansford (135029), RAFVR.
- M. F. Hatton (48699).
- F. E. Hawkins (50245).
- P. M. S. Hedgeland (122540), RAFVR.
- E. R. Hester (46465).
- R. Hoos (49586).
- J. S. Hustler (121472), RAFVR (since missing).
- A. Ion (119854), RAFVR.
- N. S. Johnson (122568), RAFVR.
- J. E. Kimberley (47963).
- R. Landymore (138431), RAFVR.
- D. I. Macdonnell (131967), RAFVR.
- E. J. McKie (120195), RAFVR.
- P. P. Mather (133928), RAFVR.
- D. Melville (129823), RAFVR.
- T. J. Middleton (50885).
- E. J. Mostyn (139280), RAFVR.
- C. T. Nance (89935), RAFVR.
- T. J. Partridge (49738).
- P. L. Phillips (133837), RAFVR.
- A. Sim (139348), RAFVR.
- A. W. Simmonds (51035).
- W. E. J. Smart (48268).
- W. S. Spittal (126031), RAFVR.
- T. A. Stirrat (48179).
- H. M. Stopper (80217), RAFVR.
- G. H. Taylor (131917), RAFVR.
- C. S. Thomas (49882), RAFO.
- J. Walker (139426), RAFVR.
- E. S. N. Weston (117237), RAFVR.
- R. S. White.
- D. H. Wiseman (138795), RAFVR.
- R. G. Woolley (137115), RAFVR.
- G. W. Wright (51258).

Royal Australian Air Force

- K. Millgate (Aus.401010) (missing).
- W. S. Moore (Aus.6813).
- L. C. Pyke (Aus.406792) (deceased).
- T. D. Wright (Aus.404310).

Royal Canadian Air Force

- J. F. Gibson (Can/J.16043).
- S. S. Williams (Can/J.15283).

Royal New Zealand Air Force

- F. C. Fox (N.Z.40762).
- M. R. Head (N.Z.413414).

South African Air Force

- 2nd Lieutenant D. G. White (205704) (deceased).

Warrant Officers

- F. F. Allcock (326839).
- B. J. Amphlett (344190).
- J. O. Annan (948344).
- S. Armitage (509932).
- A. F. Atkins (363529).
- G. W. W. Atkins (590461).
- F. E. J. Austin (313015).
- G. Austin (511998).
- H. Bailey (515493).
- W. E. Bardgett (349903).
- G. T. Barnes (550705).
- F. J. R. H. Bateman (86644).
- L. G. Batt (741474), RAFVR.
- W. E. Beard (357038).
- R. A. Bell (333939).
- J. R. Bennett (508554).
- H. L. Birbeck (363859).
- W. J. R. Birch (563607).
- A. Blackett (565473).
- G. E. Blowfield (590684).
- D. J. Bolter (565849).
- W. E. Boteler (581167).
- F. W. Boyles (355033).
- J. R. Brannan (514000).
- B. E. Brown (748554), RAFVR.
- G. G. Brown (364530)
- L. C. Butcher (361856).
- J. Carey (344215).
- E. Chalk (565703).
- H. J. Charlish (562480).
- H. A. Chatterton (562047).
- P. V. Chilmaid (514424).
- J. D. Christian (56008).
- F. Clark (506989).
- J. W. Clarke (590634).
- A. L. K. Colbeck (356093).
- C. Colwill (351073).
- F. G. Cook (513770).
- R. F. Cooper (564158).
- W. L. Gushing (331706).
- A. C. G. Davenport (326211).
- A. E. Dennard (361951).
- P. C. Dennis (535159).
- R. Dixon (561099).
- W. H. Driscoll (335736).
- J. V. Dyer (341362).
- L. D. Eastment (523017).
- A. B. Edgington (352999).
- F. Ellison (524405).
- J. Eves (509659).
- W. Farrar (348786).
- E. Fincham (590019).
- W. P. Foreshew (513971).
- F. C. French (560606).
- M. French (358657).
- A. F. Gibbs (134902).
- A. G. Godfrey (515288).
- K. T. Good (565155).
- R. C. L. W. Gordon (335610).
- T. C. Graham (359498).
- A. Grayson (515776).
- A. Greenhow (357334).
- E. J. Groombridge (364013).
- H. Grundy (511721).
- H. S. Hale (564232).
- H. R. C. Hamer (566261) (deceased).
- E. Handel (357957).
- E. J. Harle (517258).
- J. L. Harries (357948).
- A. E. Hawkridge (329437)
- J. Hayton (507152).
- R. J. Hinton (328422).
- C. A. Hodder (362006).
- C. F. Holland (363393).
- S. G. Humphries (16525).
- R. G. Husselbee (550441).
- W. H. J. Hussey (590491).
- S. R. J. James (364010).
- G. H. Jarrett (509373).
- J. L. Jarvis (357046).
- F. A. C. Jenkins (805184), AAF.
- P. W. Johnson (363012).
- G. M. Kemp (337716).
- C. W. Kidby (366134).
- A. T. Knell (340855).
- H. A. S. Knight (804051), AAF.
- G. S. Light (335959).
- C. G. Loader (565589).
- A. E. Lovell (356440).
- S. E. McLean (355529).
- J. S. McNee (365887).
- R. G. Marsh (560321).
- H. L. Martin (362427).
- H. C. Matthews (350286).
- W. E. Mercer (508397).
- R. W. Morgan (521900).
- A. G. Moss (517946).
- P. Munro (590865).
- E. A. Murden (331461).
- F. L. Newbound (326498).
- C. M. Nightingale (204289).
- J. O'Reilly (590363).
- T. P. O'Sullivan (167044).
- D. Pennington (511772).
- L. Perring (508971).
- E. F. Phelan (505653).
- R. A. Polwarth (354028).
- L. R. Prater (813004), AAF.
- D. G. Prewer (216277).
- K. R. Price (566286).
- J. M. C. Quinn (748240).
- G. A. Riddle (749525), RAFVR.
- C. H. Roper (590488).
- C. R. Rose (349030).
- E. Roughton (314911).
- G. Sanderson (513822).
- R. J. Saunders (590292).
- G. W. Schoon, DFC, (742497), RAFVR.
- A. C. Sherwood (342652).
- J. W. Shipp (508109).
- F. W. Skinner (560714).
- R. G. Snowden (345535)
- W. Stead (512485).
- R. C. Stroud (315175).
- A. A. Symcox (515185).
- R. G. Symonds (347172).
- S. Taylor (590457)
- V. A. Thomas (510735).
- P. J. Timms (510244).
- T. G. J. Tribe (352554)
- D. J. Vanstone (567080).
- A. J. Veal (351235).
- E. Warman (366475).
- T. C. Waugh (770944), RAFVR.
- R. J. Wells (580989).
- R. E. West (590134).
- T. A. Whillans (355304).
- N. White (746778), RAFVR.
- A. J. Wiles (22139).
- N. W. H. Witherington (346563).
- T. A. Woodward (523003).
- R. Wooley (550679).
- D. C. M. Wright (359439).
- E. Young (510906).
- M. W. Young (361755).
- W. G. Armstrong (561023) (Acting).
- A. F. Baldwin (591127) (Acting).
- R. J. Commins (506168) (Acting).
- A. Crowhurst (345585) (Acting).
- J. T. Dodds (356556) (Acting).
- H. Milburn (514872) (Acting).
- V. Mullis (561188) (Acting).
- G. W. Peet (562594) (Acting).
- A. H. Roberts (364237) (Acting).
- J. E. Scott (590867) (Acting).
- W. J. Seymour (365344) (Acting).
- F. Smith (363721) (Acting).
- J. W. Weir (535628) (Acting).
- A. E. Woolley (343939) (Acting).
- J. W. Wilson (565048) (Acting).
- H. A. Yakes (359452) (Acting).

Royal Canadian Air Force

- H. M. Compton (Can/R.54292).
- D. J. O'Driscoll (Can/R.65084).
- R. J. Ounstead (Can/2028A).

South African Air Force

- P. J. Marrais (P.98452).
- J. Stam (P.6631).

Flight Sergeant

- 816119 H. Adams, AAF.
- 524311 G. L. Asher.
- 411535 H. H. Ashton.
- 755648 A. P. R. Aslett, RAFVR.
- 562694 T. D. Bailes.
- 366030 A. F. Bailey.
- 776057 J. H. Baker, RAFVR.
- 513729 G. S. Barwise.
- 808001 W. Beach, AAF.
- 515955 C. M. Beckham.
- 565511 R. F. A. Bennett.
- 1381060 L. S. Bevis.
- 568913 L. H. Bishop.
- 811191 A. N. Blair, AAF.
- 563519 G. Booth.
- 525280 W. V. Bowen.
- 514097 L. F. Bramley.
- 365145 C. F. Brown.
- 529567 T. H. Brown.
- 512123 W. A. Brown.
- 355774 W. C. Brown.
- 562684 S. Brydone.
- 967968 D. A. Burden.
- 520176 W. T. Bussey.
- 527938 A. H. Butler.
- 561450 E. G. Butler.
- 514628 W. E. Butler.
- 536535 F. Cain.
- 563961 J. R. Campbell.
- 536460 J. J. Campion.
- 370847 S. E. Chandler.
- 613487 S. F. A. Chappell.
- 365206 A. L. Clarke.
- 516082 F. H. G. Clements.
- 552320 D. I. Clowe.
- 365688 J. F. Collins.
- 562667 J. Colton.
- 563076 R. M. Cooke.
- 560580 A. J. Cooper.
- 560569 A. R. B. Cousins.
- 376197 T. Coxon.
- 517473 R. Crompton.
- 354172 E. G. W. Crump.
- 359177 A. Cubitt.
- 974036 W. T. B. Dalgleish.
- 570623 R. Daykin.
- 516769 E. H. Doughty.
- 845744 J. W. Drane, AAF.
- 642659 A. Dyson.
- 562548 R. F. Eacott.
- 563967 P. H. Easterbrook.
- 519889 J. C. Edmonson.
- 567532 R. Ellwood.
- 620554 R. M. Ericksen.
- 561118 H. D. Everett.
- 517971 A. J. Fairbairn.
- 561129 A. G. E. Farrow.
- 507457 F. Finan.
- 349929 W. H. Fitzgerald.
- 520716 L. J. Flanders.
- 506549 A. A. Flowers.
- 379399 A. R. F. Fortt.
- 591153 D. F. Fowler.
- 1256802 T. J. Freeman.
- 568170 J. S. Gadsby.
- 516624 D. J. H. Gibbens.
- 515326 L. R. Goodacre.
- 366094 C. H. Goodridge.
- 524572 N. O. Greenwood.
- 565255 F. A. Gregory.
- 545814 P. W. Grinstead.
- 1192577 A. Haddon.
- 906232 E. P. D. Hall.
- 411374 F. J. Hall.
- 336707 J. L. Hall.
- 44643 T. Hall.
- 533193 A. Hamilton.
- 563542 V. M. Hammond.
- 349654 V. C. Harding.
- 524947 C. E. Hare.
- 521742 R. W. C. Harman.
- 622779 F. Harris.
- 612960 F. G. Harrison.
- 356771 F. W. Haynes.
- 560796 W. N. Hedges.
- 571610 P. G. P. Henson.
- 233859 W. T. Heptonstall.
- 561149 A. W. Herd.
- 990576 J. Hird.
- 364104 R. A. Hollamby.
- 344530 A. A. Holland.
- 562134 R. B. Holmes.
- 565557 L. W. Homer.
- 354789 H. S. Honnor.
- 523891 G. A. Hopgood.
- 561562 J. H. Horsfall.
- 560244 D. I. Hoskins.
- 365897 A. N. W. Hubbard.
- 335516 P. F. Hudson.
- 1378950 A. Humphreys.
- 969192 A. M. Hutcheon.
- 1325035 A. W. Jackson.
- 902713 J. P. U. Jacob.
- 365499 S. B. James.
- 944848 S. G. James.
- 347747 J. W. Jay.
- 14387 W. Jenkins.
- 563640 F. E. Job.
- 565591 G. E. F. Johnson.
- 756567 H. Johnson, RAFVR.
- 517802 R. Johnson.
- 813067 E. P. Jones, AAF.
- 523563 E. R. Jones.
- 560640 R. Jones.
- 565247 F. G. Judd.
- 127907 W. Keay.
- 546919 M. G. Kynaston.
- 960353 J. F. Lewis.
- 536405 J. K. Lewis.
- 507799 E. W. Livings.
- 553202 H. S. Lodge.
- 522179 W. H. Lowery.
- 562184 F. R. Lucas.
- 564051 R. G. J. Lynch.
- 540318 J. McClelland.
- 520644 N. R. E. W. Mackie.
- 354032 N. McMillan.
- 359535 W. J. G. McNeice.
- 560843 E. J. Maddick.
- 564262 W. H. Mangham.
- 356547 G. A. Marchant.
- 754344 E. S. Marsh, RAFVR.
- 561826 C. E. Marshall.
- 527368 L. J. Meakin.
- 755900 D. R. Merry, RAFVR.
- 344307 A. E. Mickle.
- 562794 A. Moor.
- 1252943 S. H. Moore.
- 349786 H. W. B. Morley.
- 97853 E. J. Morris.
- 812355 A. L. Newman, AAF.
- 966772 A. D. R. Orr.
- 365917 J.Osborne.
- 511032 E. C. Oxford.
- 510981 G. Painter.
- 48066 G. D. Parker.
- 550608 J. I. Parry.
- 359981 T.Patten.
- 564782 C. T. Pawley.
- 1053584 T. G. Paxton (deceased).
- 568653 A. Pearson.
- 510915 A. E. Perry.
- 564295 T. A. Peters.
- 561871 R. C. Phillips.
- 516031 J. E. Player.
- 509146 G. E. Powell.
- 616743 N. F. Powell.
- 240373 F. W. F. Pratt.
- 569582 J. T. Prentice.
- 560383 W. J. Prickett.
- 346273 L. T. Pullinger.
- 524587 H. C. Puxley.
- 564370 I. J. C. Radley.
- 514559 T. Ramsey
- 507583 W. S. Rand.
- 106411 H. Reid.
- 513732 J. Reid.
- 515240 T. Roberts.
- 526458 G. A. Robinson.
- 991316 W. Robinson.
- 569147 J. R. Ruddick.
- 564809 K. R. Sainsbury.
- 517565 J. E. Samuels.
- 516698 C. R. Scammell.
- 264049 T. B. M. Scott.
- 639389 W. Scott.
- 945125 E. C. Sills.
- 542006 D. M. Simpson.
- 560921 R. R. Skinner.
- 560923 B. A. Smith.
- 89302 T. W. Smith.
- 753 W. J. Southgate.
- 207586 M. W. Spanton.
- 61533 J. Stanton.
- 545119 L. Steele.
- 561375 D. J. Strange.
- 513649 A. H. Strudwick.
- 87369 S. Sturdy.
- 562310 W. W. Suckling.
- 564286 F. E. Swain.
- 1162805 S. C. Sykes.
- 45532 T. H. Taylor.
- 359212 S. Teague.
- 524844 A. S. Teale.
- 531207 W. H. Tebby.
- 535459 G. G. R. Terry.
- 563419 F. E. Thatcher.
- 564430 H. F. Theobald.
- 562997 A. C. Thomas, DFM.
- 761206 C. L. Thomas, RAFVR.
- 562917 J. F. Thomas.
- 801351 R. A. Titman, AAF.
- 563415 W. Todd.
- 505202 R. L. M. Triolaire.
- 326378 G. L. Trotter.
- 63324 J. E. Trow.
- 546920 J. Turpin.
- 560956 E. J. Tyler.
- 366478 A. E. Walter.
- 615341 F. J. Warden.
- 591118 J. M. Wardlaw.
- 507552 W. J. Warren.
- 364752 H. O. J. Watts.
- 560490 H. Webb.
- 568350 L. C. Webb.
- 565015 P. L. Webb.
- 328012 L. H. Weeks.
- 758120 G. R. E. Weir, RAFVR.
- 560945 L. Welch.
- 561664 R. A. L. White.
- 568330 F. E. Williams.
- 590922 T. Williams.
- 590908 J. Wilson.
- 342082 P. H. Woodbridge.
- 363051 A. T. Woolley.
- 6i5579 G. A. Wren.
- 347554 E. I. Wright.
- 560475 D. R. Young.
- 514516 H. C. Young.
- 701110 A. E. Ager (Acting).
- 537738 W. T. Andrewartha (Acting).
- 539703 D. J. Barnes (Acting).
- 241056 G. J. Barnett (Acting).
- 535778 M. E. F. Blaymires (Acting).
- 1180984 J. L. Brodie (Acting).
- 543557 G. A. Brookes (Acting).
- 750292 J. N. W. Chambers (Acting), RAFVR.
- 1376870 B. J. R. Cuthbert (Acting).
- 627831 W. W. Denney (Acting).
- 505189 C. Donald (Acting).
- 770559 G. S. Bumble (Acting), RAFVR.
- 967525 L. Fearby (Acting).
- 506685 A. E. Gooch (Acting).
- 516592 R. L. J. Goulter (Acting).
- 511167 R. H. Hall (Acting).
- 565567 R. H. Heathcote (Acting).
- 993751 A. B. Hill (Acting).
- 563166 A. D. Hill (Acting).
- 539740 K. A. Holman (Acting).
- 974381 K. S. W. Hunt (Acting).
- 564236 R. C. N. Johnson (Acting).
- 553225 P. 0 Jones (Acting).
- 1250412 J. F. Jordan (Acting).
- 561571 W. H. G. Knight (Acting).
- 561599 D. F. Mccarthy (Acting).
- 979697 W. F. Mason (Acting).
- 356668 W. D. O. Mumford (Acting).
- 565711 J. C, Munro (Acting).
- 1055035 W. J. Murison (Acting).
- 983050 J. E. Payne (Acting).
- 1304129 L. R. Pearce (Acting).
- 1051946 S. G. Poulter (Acting).
- 567093 I. Scott (Acting).
- 566282 R. A. A. Simpson (Acting).
- 567807 G. Smith (Acting).
- 549596 G. A. Smith (Acting).
- 539978 R. W. Thornton (Acting).
- 565217 G. Timms (Acting).
- 563356 D. R. Waddington (Acting).
- 516874 R. W. White (Acting).
- 927512 J. Woods (Acting).

Royal Australian Air Force

- Aus.404227 G. M. Ball.
- Aus.403021 H. E. Beale (since deceased).
- Aus.404024 C. C. Bradley.
- Aus.411440 R. M. Burgher.
- Aus.3913 O. E. Ferguson.
- Aus.3915 J. A. Forbes.
- Aus.5355 J. H. Goodall.
- Aus.403337 W. F. Hird.
- Aus.400739 F. S. Stevens.
- Aus.407086 R. Warwick.
- Aus.2521 G. Webber.

Royal Canadian Air Force

- Can/4399A H. L. Cook.
- Can/R.82128 G. Croisiau.
- Can/R.95585 F. P. Grant.
- Can/R.73200 W. F. Palmer.
- Can/R.78065 A. C. Young.

South African Air Force

- 95874 G. F. Abramse.
- P.735 L. H. Bowles.
- P.4979 L. F. Bussio.
- P.5654 H. J. Cullabine.
- P.824 P. A. Nesbitt.
- P.96737 L. A. Stead.
- 98953 A. G. Swan.
- P.141930 N. E. Vaughan.

Sergeants

- 1295122 G. Allen.
- 1198773 L. J. Allen.
- 194529 G. H. Anderson.
- 1009763 W. G. D. M. Anderson.
- 938229 H. Angus.
- 533776 N. Anson.
- 907905 R. D. Archer.
- 926099 F. V. Ashman.
- 534812 W. Atherton.
- 524013 J. Atkinson.
- 1325008 R. W. Bagnall.
- 653804 W. Baird.
- 966068 R. Bassnett.
- 534634 W. E. Beaton.
- 639836 T. J. Beddows.
- 532215 C. R. Beer.
- 909441 H. Benford.
- 537711 G. R. Berrow.
- 615481 E. Beverley.
- 515664 B. F. Bishop.
- 1031897 A. H. J. Black.
- 613728 J. Blair.
- 5079265 E. Blenkarn.
- 982583 F. Bloor.
- 964193 J. E. Boneham.
- 545251 R. J. Bottomley.
- 978843 J. Y. Boyd.
- 1389844 H. J. Brack.
- 1177617 D. B. Brazier.
- 1114448 J. Brooks.
- 349899 W. C. Brown.
- 566382 P. N. C. Browne.
- 566069 W. E. J. Bullock.
- 222092 D. Bunn.
- 1186589 H. W. Burchell.
- 538286 A. A. Burns.
- 355195 R. S. Burt.
- 1010004 C. F. Busby.
- 747572 F. R. C. Butler, RAFVR.
- 649656 B. S. G. Button.
- 1156671 G. W. Byer.
- 1308581 C. A. Byford.
- 621666 J. A. Callender.
- 903068 H. P. Calvert.
- 1311025 K. E. Calvert.
- 936339 E. G. Campbell.
- 1289031 R. C. Carter.
- 569350 M. V. Chambers.
- 566604 R. E. A. Chaney.
- 571423 T. A. Chapman.
- 568716 R. Clacher.
- 566926 A. S. R. S. Clark.
- 949367 E. Clark.
- 953760 L. F. Clark.
- 933225 D. G. Clarke.
- 937386 H. Clayton.
- 946151 W. D. Clements.
- 508651 J. Cockburn.
- 1059357 B. B. Collins.
- 1191768 E. W. Collins.
- 87877 D. S. Cooper.
- 1326704 J. Cordrey.
- 342747 J. J. Costello.
- 973618 H. J. A. Coutts.
- 518271 J. N. Crouch.
- 539596 S. C. Crowther.
- 908087 F. T. Cuckow.
- 1200611 B. M. Cunningham.
- 757406 T. E. Datlen, RAFVR.
- 1022485 L. H. Davenport.
- 9206411 Davies.
- 937521 W. A. Davies.
- 964267 E. J. Detheridge.
- 1350821 P. A. Dick.
- 994271 W. Dickens.
- 567522 F. W. B. Duckworth.
- 771030 G. Duffill.
- 1172960 L. C. Dymond.
- 1011757 G. A. Elston.
- 747052 C. Eltherington, RAFVR.
- 640914 A. Evans.
- 506328 C. F. W. Fawcett.
- 261175 I. Fearnley.
- 746714 D. S. Fellick, RAFVR.
- 531126 W. E. Finch-Savage.
- 522587 J. Fitton.
- 812153 J. A. Fletcher, AAF.
- 546662 L. D. Forbes.
- 528854 C. Forrest.
- 1062737 J. J. Forrester.
- 812087 W. H. Fox, AAF.
- 564331 J. E. Franklin.
- 281226 S. T. French.
- 519350 A. Frew.
- 347117 R. J. Gardiner.
- 1117170 J. Gibb.
- 13617 A. Gibbons.
- 744399 H. J. Gidney, RAFVR.
- 988223 J. Gillespie.
- 958516 K. R. Gorton.
- 565547 T. A. Gould.
- 616750 M. Graham.
- 770301 T. A. Grainger, RAFVR.
- 538318 J. T. Gray.
- 808147 B. Grimes, AAF.
- 1184919 W. G. Grundy.
- 1283177 J. C. Haldon.
- 130526 W. Hall.
- 994606 J. Hamilton.
- 1203385 N. Hammond.
- 777818 J. Hannay, RAFVR.
- 1071862 H. R. Harris.
- 571609 H. S. Harris.
- 1255729 J. Harrison.
- 341438 W. H. Harrison.
- 905993 E. A. Hawkes.
- 617819 J. P. Henderson.
- 547369 J. W. Henley.
- 573313 P. J. Hile.
- 1267963 E. R. H. Hodge.
- 1356440 C. I. Hodgson.
- 648853 E. Hogg.
- 916925 R. G. Hollingdale.
- 566172 J. W. Holmes.
- 569516 S. W. Hopgood.
- 2211 P. E. Horne.
- 66172 D. C. Horner.
- 630620 E. R. Horner.
- 744665 H. A. J. Howard, RAFVR.
- 1156672 R. A. Hudson.
- 912864 A. G. Hughes.
- 328929 W. Humble.
- 563972 H. Hunt.
- 1274191 M. E. Hunt.
- 540182 S. P. Hunt.
- 1250835 L. E. Hyde.
- 1304776 H. H. Jackson.
- 517854 R. W. Jackson.
- 1329893 J. Jamieson.
- 331864 E. C. Jarvis.
- 576050 J. E. Jeffery.
- 542843 J. E. L. Jenkins.
- 1015610 L. Jibson.
- 639739 A. L. Jones.
- 532628 E. H. B Jones.
- 913507 C. T. Kelly.
- 981474 H. T. Kemp.
- 980263 A. Kennan.
- 921376 L. W. J. King.
- 567385 J. L. Kinnear.
- 802417 A. Kirkpatrick, AAF.
- 902384 F. I. Knowles.
- 356752 E. C. Leaman.
- 537234 H. Lee.
- 536028 S. Leonard.
- 651049 H. R. G. Lidstone.
- 1105489 R. F. Lillie.
- 530452 R. Little.
- 1113116 M. G. K. Lund.
- 527917 J. McKeag.
- 994362 J. W. Mackie.
- 988264 E. McKiNna.
- 550799 J. C. McPartland.
- 770016 C. H. B. McRoberts.
- 564899 H. T. Manns.
- 429711 E. M. Markwick.
- 1163604 R. Martin.
- 517962 W. D. Martin.
- 770469 W. F. Martin.
- 1283779 J. R. Mason.
- 1164520 B. J. B. Meadows.
- 623624 A. Mercer.
- 1016025 G. S. Metcalfe.
- 920826 M. F. G. Mill.
- 956063 G. Miller.
- 924027 M. J. Mills (deceased).
- 62339 M. J. Mitchell.
- 411348 W. Mitchell.
- 643092 L. Miveld.
- 525782 J. Mode.
- 520363 G. P. Moore.
- 1358789 D. W. Morgans.
- 771056 J. A. Morley.
- 541035 R. F. Morrice
- 1379847 H. S. Morris.
- 528059 R. F. Morris.
- 571657 T. W. Mould.
- 523839 H. W. Neal.
- 1444045 E. B. New.
- 525997 A. Newby.
- 936022 W. Oakes.
- 1736005 F. A. S. Page.
- 517254 G. W. Parker.
- 953897 R. F. Parkes.
- 1359700 S. J. Pay.
- 748825 W. A. Peacock, RAFVR.
- 520299 F. Percy
- 362545 R. A. Pikesley.
- 568762 C. A. Place.
- 751743 J. M. Poole, RAFVR.
- 1185393 W. H. Portsmouth.
- 750421 H. Powell, RAFVR.
- 1152018 R. Press.
- 1177274 R. D. Puddick.
- 531888 R. W. A. Pusey.
- 1202798 J. L. Ranson.
- 330697 J. S. Reid.
- 528660 W. R. Reynolds.
- 566161 C. T. Rilett.
- 566363 G. Riley.
- 357134 R. Ripley.
- 643945 A. Roberts.
- 908178 J. W. Roberts.
- 518925 R. F. Roberts.
- 1108032 H. Robson.
- 1319959 L. W. Rochford.
- 653525 J. Rogers.
- 1307141 J. R. Rogers.
- 1303090 K. S. Rogerson.
- 370637 C. W. Rudland.
- 907470 J. A. Rumsby.
- 552404 S. C. Rust.
- 617854 E. S. Sadler.
- 702678 L. G. Savage.
- 539312 A. E. Sayle.
- 963388 E. F. Scadding.
- 974864 J. Schofield.
- 506101 R. Scoffield.
- 1078127 B. J. Seaman.
- 743393 S. Sharpe, RAFVR.
- 742749 J. C. Shaw, RAFVR (deceased).
- 517433 J. Shearman.
- 522542 J. Sheldon.
- 652158 J. Sherrington.
- 348723 W. Sherwood.
- 1051355 J. Shirra.
- 1019749 J. Shuttleworth.
- 937350 P. Singleton.
- 626756 J. Slade.
- 1063162 L. J. Slocombe.
- 568309 A. A. Smith.
- 1206905 A. H. Smith.
- 642271 G. W. Smith.
- 511764 W. H. Soulsby.
- 987510 G. Spencer.
- 1009641 H. B. Spencer.
- 512838 G. D. Steng.
- 1057308 G. R. Stevenson.
- 901961 G. A. Stuart.
- 614510 C. G. Sutton.
- 570145 P. E. V. Talbot.
- 612361 L. A. M. Taplin.
- 526408 G. E. Taylor.
- 567147 J. Taylor.
- 1267277 E. H. Tee.
- 370966 J. W. Tempest.
- 1253301 R. H. Thomas.
- 1024836 J. Thorndike.
- 1063638 L. Thorpe.
- 282465 A. A. Timmins.
- 1304404 T. E. Towriss.
- 915193 H. G. Triggs.
- 747894 L. Trimby, RAFVR.
- 1114148 E. T. Tunstall.
- 522863 D. G. Turner.
- 954971 G. Turner.
- 567105 J. E. Twelvetree.
- 1254292 A. E. Tyers.
- 700870 W. W. Valentine.
- 539702 M. H. Walkley.
- 507175 G. E. J. Walsh.
- 701471 J. W. Walton.
- 570083 E. J. Warrington
- 568356 H. V. Waterman.
- 522921 J. Watson.
- 1058291 S. Watson.
- 569620 I. F. Weekes.
- 964655 J. C. Weston.
- 957260 W. H. Wherrell.
- 521724 L. E. White.
- 954109 L. C. Whittaker.
- 1136124 D. G. Williams.
- 560789 J. Williams.
- 970099 E. W. Wilsdon.
- 1106540 W. A. Winpenny.
- 803588 A. Wishart, AAF.
- 906666 W. C. Wood.
- 568594 J. N. Woodman.
- 919083 W. H. Woolford.
- 1220969 E. H. Wright.
- 345560 A. Wyatt.
- 917232 L. F. Yates.
- 352959 J. H. Yearsley.
- 991506 F. Yewdall.
- J365185 W. M. Young.
- 755959 G. A. Zirk, RAFVR.
- 934835 W. J. Cross (Acting).
- 978360 J. G. W. Dale (Acting).
- 1180958 E. R. Devereux (Acting).
- 1042273 T. R. Hall (Acting).
- 901195 J. C. Heveron (Acting).
- 1256192 F. A. Jones (Acting).
- 924589 F. G. Lockley (Acting).
- 631272 P. J. McGowan (Acting).
- 510888 G. E. Nield (Acting).
- 100934 W. H. Shackleton (Acting).
- 872529 G. W. Sherwood (Acting), AAF.
- 352339 C. A. Taylor (Acting).
- 976293 M. I. Whittingham (Acting).

Royal Australian Air Force

- Aus.4193 S. Abadee.
- Aus.401099 D. W. P. Borthwick.
- Aus.24099 H. W. Campbell.
- Aus.11706 A. V. Chadwick.
- Aus.403693 K. Goulder.
- Aus.402695 A. H. Gregory.
- Aus.407955 A. R. Tregenza.
- Aus.11411 C. R. Wilson.

Royal Canadian Air Force

- Can/R.90629 J. A. Adams.
- Can/R.109968 R. T. Botkin.
- Can/R.55899 J. H. Boudreau.
- Can/R.85060 R. G. Calder.
- Can/R.105785 G. E. Chamney.
- Can/R.106667 G. O. Ellergodt.
- Can/R.90247 L. A. Frost.
- Can/R.98870 W. K. McIntyre.
- Can/63605 H. M. Robertson.
- Can/R.66962 H. R. Robertson.
- Can/R.77579 G. B. Watson.
- Can/R.101741 M. G. Webb.

Royal New Zealand Air Force

- N.Z.402240 E. W. Barr.
- N.Z.416084 R. Brough (since deceased).
- N.Z.402061 J. L. Joyce.
- N.Z.41597 J. A. McPhearson.

South African Air Force

Air Sergeants

- P.209535 L. Havemann.
- P.94200 H. H. Hough.
- P.141369 W. Joubert.
- P.30986 K. J. Richardson.
- P.4723 J. E. Sanan.
- P.135130 G. Taylor.
- 97440 J. E. Young.
- P.202467 L. N. Kent.

Corporals

- 1101166 C. H. Agar.
- 979294 F. Agnew.
- 1127236 R. F. Air.
- 528206 J. R. Aitken.
- 971573 W. Aitken.
- 537484 R. C. Altkenhead.
- 287197 H. J. Allgood.
- 1376027 S. C. M. Ames.
- 1286983 S. S. Ansell.
- 935157 J. A. Appleby.
- 774989 Y. Aptekman.
- 341652 D. W. A. Arbon.
- 517899 G. E. H. Arnold.
- 1161000 N. J. Arthur.
- 625477 P. Ashton.
- 1050332 H. Aspin.
- 920970 E. Bachmann.
- 1289006 F. W. Bailey.
- 981222 D. Bain.
- 1289344 H. S. Baker.
- 993702 J. Bardsley.
- 808415 J. W. Bartley, AAF.
- 951165 R. A. Bashford.
- 1537176 C. W. Bates.
- 1166701 H. P. Bates.
- 923057 R. H. Bates.
- 906756 W. F. J. Battarbee.
- 969990 R. S. Batten.
- 809011 B. F. Bean, AAF.
- 553983 W. M. Beasley.
- 1060682 D. A. McC Beaton.
- 1365717 A. W. Beattie.
- 1107646 H. M. Bell.
- 1007502 N. Bell.
- 1123213 T. D. Benn.
- 1060927 S. Berry.
- 1200194 E. A. Betts.
- 1173249 S. J. Betts.
- 900719 T. S. Betts.
- 1063132 T. H. Bigglestone.
- 1060010 D. Binns.
- 1190217 A. Birks.
- 1052963 H. Black.
- 1246737 L. J. Blake.
- 1400939 A. L. Bourne.
- 1384064 A. E. N. Branch.
- 1017864 W. G. Bremner.
- 747869 W. T. Briar, RAFVR.
- 518947 G. P. Bristow.
- 989145 D. Brown.
- 1502697 J. Buck.
- 1174780 A. W. C. Burden.
- 770827 J. Burge.
- 1177018 A. J. Burgess.
- 1161670 D. A. Burgess.
- 753074 T. E. Butler, RAFVR.
- 973063 P. A. Campbell.
- 101529 W. J. Carson.
- 1080207 R. Carter.
- 536175 E. Cassell.
- 1170775 A. F. Castle.
- 1207013 A. W. Chase.
- 623348 L. S. Chinery.
- 956743 K. H. Chivers.
- 936330 D. H. Clamp.
- 541867 C. F. Claridge.
- 591542 I. G. Clark.
- 801166 A. Clarke, AAF.
- 1332370 B. Clarke.
- 111756 J. W. L. Clelland.
- 952754 J. F. Cochen.
- 1152194 F. S. Colby.
- 1463870 E. W. H. Collett.
- 1269322 J. J. Collins.
- 918046 W. T. L. Collins.
- 1292643 H. S. Constable.
- 1161183 J. H. Cook.
- 1165762 R. L. Cook.
- 1267627 D. C. Cowell.
- 126669 D. Cox.
- 619454 E. Coyle.
- 910966 H. Creasey.
- 1290653 G. E. Crow.
- 574513 R. Crowe.
- 1113117 C. C. Crump.
- 910383 W. J. Crump.
- 901097 R. A. Cutting.
- 139364 D. F. Daniels.
- 921488 P. J. Daniels.
- 938739 T. F. Davies.
- 921545 A. H. Davis.
- 1500973 G. R. Davis.
- 940712 T. H. Davis.
- 909987 E. D. Dawson.
- 1377492 J. A. Dawson.
- 1290650 A. C. Denne.
- 1062649 V. M. Denver.
- 1181390 C. R. Dicken.
- 347651 C. Dilly.
- 939681 J. A. Dodd.
- 1356104 D. Doig.
- 909641 R. W. Dominey.
- 1223774 E. G. Dove.
- 1439271 J. D. N. Dowie.
- 1292563 P. C. Doye.
- 940431 W. H. Drake.
- 925674 R. G. J. Driver.
- 960618 D. A. Drysdale.
- 1017381 H. J. Easter.
- 1005475 W. Eccles.
- 318263 E. G. Edwards.
- 1127900 F. Elcock.
- 1281145 D. S. Eldred.
- 940170 A. L. Elgood.
- 949138 J. T. Else.
- 1215921 W. P. J. Every.
- 966278 G. D. Ewen.
- 749659 S. H. W. Farr, RAFVR.
- 936742 E. J. Farrer.
- 1217205 S. Fazakerley.
- 1153423 H. M. Fells.
- 969070 W. Finney.
- 1379283 H. G. Fisher.
- 613726 J. Fitzsimmons.
- 956506 L. R. Foster.
- 516466 A. Fowler.
- 1264607 A. M. Fowler.
- 530101 J. A. G. Frampton.
- 1126134 D. Frost.
- 1054459 E. Garry.
- 1199776 W. Garside.
- 639555 T. J. Gerry.
- 946499 A. Gilbert.
- 702461 A. A. T. Gilbert.
- 1060550 G. Giles.
- 912510 J. B. Girdwood.
- 1252167 D. C. O. Glenister.
- 777731 R. B. Glover.
- 916467 R. R. Goddard.
- 574137 L. Jamieson.
- 808288 R. Jaques, AAF.
- 1015715 J. E. Jarvis.
- 984453 R. C. Jenkins.
- 1366844 W. Jessiman.
- 1186923 R. A. Rear.
- 1202514 E. C. Keen.
- 1292501 R. E. Killick.
- 1176812 H. W. R. Kindred.
- 535824 A. S. Kirrage.
- 995046 J. R. Knight.
- 702153 A. C. Knott.
- 634604 A. D. Knowles.
- 522488 P. T. B. Knox.
- 1161766 S. M. O. Lackey.
- 1196923 L. C. G. Larbey.
- 1196167 A. E. Larkman.
- 633331 W. Latham.
- 1156752 L. W. Leach.
- 1270078 W. A. Leard.
- 571626 R. M. V. Leese.
- 1365247 H. Lennox.
- 511705 W. J. Leroy.
- 746221 H. G. Lewis, RAFVR.
- 639547 M. G. Lines.
- 1257915 T. Lowrey.
- 1310455 A. Lycett.
- 1289298 G. J. McDermott.
- 1223872 H. Godden-Wood.
- 1502352 W. Mackay.
- 1170064 A. E. Marks.
- 1610679 E. J. Marment.
- 903223 B. L. Martin.
- 904536 F. R. Maskill.
- 524738 S. Matheson.
- 942467 R. H. Maynard.
- 576812 R. L. Medland.
- 971749 A. Mellor.
- 948112 K. W. Midgley.
- 653870 D. T. Miles.
- 1122347 S. M. Miller.
- 1074561 T. R. Miller.
- 949773 C. Mills.
- 808290 R. Milroy, AAF.
- 1014491 H. M. Milton.
- 963611 P. F. Mitchell.
- 913126 G. Mockford.
- 1034256 F. Moores.
- 560664 R. G. T. Morey.
- 903848 D. M. A. Morley.
- 532856 F. J. Morris.
- 961355 J. Godfrey.
- 940360 A. Godwin.
- 1240289 V. J. Goy.
- 1379200 A. M. Gray.
- 1204254 R. Greenfield.
- 1221296 W. W. Groves.
- 1037600 J. E. Hall.
- 1354384 W. H. Hall.
- 637249 T. Halligan.
- 1263087 L. D. Halls.
- 1196843 R. Harding.
- 573095 R. Harding.
- 957963 A. H. Hare.
- 1221907 W. L. Harris.
- 1021232 G. Hartley.
- 747571 B. F. Harwood, RAFVR.
- 1000109 W. F. Hasnip.
- 1082670 E. G. Hayes.
- 1031143 A. E. Haynes.
- 1067691 J. T. Heathcote.
- 1181508 C. J. Hemshall.
- 1189082 J. A. Henshaw.
- 1098667 S. Hesketh.
- 701348 M. A. C. Hewings.
- 756620 K. A. Hides, RAFVR.
- 521040 J. C. Higgs.
- 633686 C. Higson.
- 971633 W. Hodgson.
- 702066 D. A. Holloway.
- 752143 K. J. Holmes, RAFVR.
- 1054083 T. W. Hopper.
- 949221 D. Hopton.
- 982640 E. Horrobin.
- 1022398 H. Howarth.
- 1101080 J. Hudson.
- 1134097 H. Hughes.
- 847690 A. W. Humphries, AAF.
- 1182585 K. W. Humphries.
- 950371 R. Hunter.
- 937652 D. Hutt.
- 618268 D. J. Irving.
- 964769 C. C. Ives.
- 988847 J. F. Jackson.
- 905837 P. M. Jackson.
- 1502841 A. W. James.
- 632608 A. S. Jamieson.
- 1054460 J. Mcdowell.
- 358ll8 H. L. J. Mountstephens.
- 1007218 P. Mulhearn.
- 1283804 K. A. Nash.
- 1124327 A. N. Needham.
- 983475 T. Nichol.
- 1167273 J. L. Nicholls.
- 1326760 K. A. Nicol.
- 339543 J.Norburn.
- 519026 L. H. Norman.
- 1117786 F. W. Nunley.
- 752392 T. G. O'Connell, RAFVR.
- 1128557 C. O'Hara.
- 961606 J. E. Osborne.
- 1110873 F. V. Outwin.
- 1258028 F. L. Palmer.
- 1271731 F. E. A. Pankhurst.
- 617806 T. W. Pape.
- 1073313 R. Parkinson.
- 750923 P. C. Pavey, RAFVR.
- 1274947 S. V. Pay.
- 575939 E. Pearce.
- 1166359 H. L. A. Pearce.
- 921768 P. Pearse.
- 937938 T. E. Pearson.
- 1160199 S. A. Pettitt.
- 1016148 H. L. Phillips.
- 523308 A. Pickles.
- 989313 R. D. Piper.
- 975156 W. Powley.
- 1009318 L. T. Price.
- 1064729 H. Priestly.
- J257723 A. D. Prior.
- 946233 A. S. Pritchard.
- 753630 H. W. Pugh, RAFVR.
- 1004323 R. A. Raffan.
- 1012577 C. F. Ralph.
- 1012579 J. Ramsay.
- 1294182 A. W. C. Read.
- 543648 J. C. Reid.
- 976493 L. D. M. Reid.
- 956571 R. J. Reynolds.
- 2053032 E. D. Rhodes
- 1015889 I. Rice.
- 1209960 P. J. Ripper.
- 1054644 R. Rivett.
- 960992 R. F. B. Robbins.
- 916844 I. E. Rodwell.
- 945949 W. S. Rolinson.
- 966485 W. Rooney.
- 971176 S. Rowland.
- 541261 C. E. Rutley.
- 1202733 F. C. Sampson.
- 967720 R. T. Scarisbrick.
- 1262174 G. A. Service.
- 572236 D. T. Sewell.
- 942922 E. G. Shaw.
- 1259986 E. A. G. Shearman.
- 914930 D. B. Simmonds.
- 1071210 J. W. Simpson.
- 649649 W. Skipworth.
- 1050290 W. Smart.
- 1143139 A. R. Smith.
- 941490 D. A. Smith.
- 1282569 E. A. Smith.
- 651544 F. T. G. Smith.
- 906838 G. Smith.
- 970711 H. Smith.
- 540256 J. A. Smith.
- 591745 J. H. Smith.
- 1203108 K. W. Smith.
- 1274071 L. R. Soden.
- 995028 J. Somerville.
- 904842 A. W. V. Southworth.
- J258393 G. A. Sparkes.
- 1019643 E. B. Spooner.
- 1220955 G. R. Squire.
- 1185556 F. Stagey.
- 985849 R. Stan Worth.
- 248161 A. J. Still.
- 1166595 J. M. C. Stone.
- 619432 F. Street.
- 1109253 H. Summers.
- 911681 R. S. Sunnucks.
- 1156546 W. C. Sutherley.
- 1301797 W. Tait.
- 981734 W. Talbot.
- 347381 F. G. Thomas.
- 1038620 J. Thompson.
- 1051304 L. C. Tindall.
- 1241491 J. R. Tinkler.
- 812053 A. J. Todd, AAF.
- 1436548 P. F. S. Todd.
- 1058078 J. Townsend.
- 1015891 S. I. J. Trebilcock.
- 982539 R. E. Trigg.
- 1204438 C. V. Tugby.
- 525104 G. A. Turner.
- 1222318 G. W. Turner.
- 1476477 R. Turner.
- 926280 E. G. Twelvetree.
- 961452 E. T. L. Tyler.
- 351699 G. R. Uden.
- 1069542 H. E. Waddingham.
- 909665 L. A. Walker.
- 998141 R. Walker.
- 1204440 R. T. N. Waller.
- 407811 J. Walley.
- 925215 R. S. Walter.
- 929215 S. C. W. Ward.
- 1158868 A. J. Waters.
- 770989 E. A. Watson.
- 811051 H. Watson, AAF.
- 954961 J. Watt.
- 947310 C. F. C. Watts.
- 747302 F. C. G. Watts, RAFVR.
- 626015 R. G. Weaver.
- 1088279 N. Webster.
- 1093243 H. C. Wells.
- 1005080 S. Westhead.
- 908925 L. W. Westlake.
- 951401 W. Whalley.
- 1141583 A. G. B. Wheaton.
- 953007 W. G. R. Whitaker.
- 752763 J. White, RAFVR.
- 905578 N. E. White.
- 632510 K. J. Whittaker.
- 951740 G. A. Y. Wicks.
- 905677 S. Wilkins.
- 1404864 D. M. Williams.
- 627463 G. K. Williams.
- 921314 G. W. Willing.
- 956510 R. Willson.
- 1281014 E. W. J. Wilson.
- 998750 F. Wilson.
- 1189335 F. W. Wilson.
- 633174 H. Wilson.
- 915453 S. R. Wilson.
- 984053 R. T. Wimshurst.
- 545309 H. W. Wing.
- 359991 E. J. Woodger.
- 529688 C. Woods.
- 1386082 D. W. Woods.
- 1158026 J. J. Wormald.
- 1220022 R. W. Wright.
- 529392 R. Y. Wright.
- 980970 T. Wylie.
- 1444002 I. Babiak (Acting).
- 542550 H. D. Blakely (Acting).
- 646424 F. W. Boniface (Acting).
- 914079 F. D. Boon (Acting).
- 1199262 P. Brocking (Acting).
- 1189110 G. T. Hales (Acting).
- 1444248 E. C. H. Hoare (Acting).
- 1091804 W. S. Lowder (Acting).
- 1130653 W. J. Naylor (Acting).
- 1022094 J. Parry (Acting).
- 1226633 J. D. Rothery (Acting).
- 1015745 D. Small (Acting).
- 1171989 C. G. Smith (Acting).
- 647150 A. F. Tee (Acting).
- 1071121 F. Waller (Acting).
- Can/R.83293 G. H. Hall, Royal Canadian Air Force.

South African Air Force

Air Corporals

- P.61163 C. J. Cassell.
- 235380 D. L. Flanagan.
- P.96185 O. C. Hands.
- P.99772 V. W. Horn.
- P.208483 H. D. Mason.
- P.208953 C. J. D. Truter.
- 207251 J. W. Billett (Acting).
- 102012 E. C. De Klerk (Acting).
- 338103 A. J. Rudham (Acting)

Leading Aircraftmen

- 1035765 J. Aaron.
- 1087266 K. T. Adams.
- 1158349 L. R. Allwright.
- 1175129 A. J. Anderton.
- 1152232 H. J. Angel.
- 1367160 D. P. Armour.
- 920819 A. J. Arnold.
- 1117812 R. B. Ashton.
- 1354007 W. H. Aston.
- 1286998 H. G. Avis.
- 1147220 E. N. Aylett.
- 636331 J. A. Backhouse.
- 1239192 J. Baker.
- 984360 A. E. Bancroft.
- 701550 H. D. Barnes.
- 1048161 B. T. Barrett.
- 1270542 J. N. Barrow.
- 639267 F. C. Barry.
- 919295 A. E. Bartlett.
- 1400350 W. G. Battishall.
- 992873 A. Beaden.
- 1178982 E. Beer.
- 1257837 L. H. Benn.
- 1531854 K. Bernard.
- 1041081 N. H. K. Best.
- 1465508 L. J. Bird.
- 1158798 R. J. Blogg.
- 1252591 R. Bradshaw.
- 938199 W. F. Breese.
- 1123919 L. E. Breffit.
- 1067175 A. Brereton.
- 101529 R. J. Brignell.
- 1222234 C. E. Britton.
- 999764 A. Broadbent.
- 636909 H. Broadbent.
- 1505439 J. R. Broadhurst.
- 944935 T. Brown.
- 957946 W. O. Bullman.
- 1054505 A. T. Burley.
- 1410282 A. G. Burnett.
- 1495101 W. H. Cain.
- 1254612 S. J. Caddy.
- 791147 G. Callaja.
- 1170666 R. P. Callear.
- 1004232 K. Carr.
- 1292056 B. Chalker.
- 1177674 J. A. Chamberlain.
- 630312 J. R. Clay.
- 1432632 C. W. Clement.
- 513383 T. A. Clift.
- 1288078 A. W. Cobb.
- 1206411 L. Cobbett.
- 1200404 F. Coffen.
- 934623 G. W. Collins.
- 1009751 S. Copple.
- 615688 G. Corbett.
- 1213939 A. Cotter.
- 1069186 W. Coulton.
- 983797 J. S. Cowen.
- 1102433 E. H. E. Crandon.
- 1113955 J. E. Crompton.
- 1157079 A. G. Cross.
- 1041164 L. Cubbon.
- 943835 P. T. Dalby.
- 971119 H. Daniels.
- 1428680 B. E. Dann.
- 1266462 E. E. Danneau.
- 1148202 A. Davies.
- 961922 R. I. Davies.
- 549572 W. L. Davis.
- 1081149 K. Diacoff.
- 644475 J. Doan.
- 1384945 J. Doyle.
- 907486 B. J. Edwards.
- 1163744 C. N. W. Edwards.
- 651838 J. Edwards.
- 1424780 A. W. Ellacott.
- 149778 W. A. S. Ellis.
- 930768 E. J. Emms.
- 799594 R. Enderby.
- 1344936 G. A. Esson.
- 977949 H. L. Evans.
- 1064788 I. J. Evans.
- 910783 M. J. Fagan.
- 1258312 J. J. Fletcher.
- 952232 L. M. Foster.
- 902686 C. Foyle.
- 1432878 D. G. Francis.
- 1072916 G. E. P. Frost.
- 1538267 B. J. Gannon.
- 1359078 W. E. Gannon.
- 652452 G. Garlick.
- 633048 P. R. Gartery.
- 1195657 F. G. Gasken.
- 649280 A. J. Gaythwaite.
- 1042628 J. S. Geary.
- 969077 J. G. Gibson.
- 1128799 O. Gilston.
- 540380 H. R. Gisbourne.
- 1613200 I. D. Gladwin.
- 1226149 W. Gleed.
- 601143 R. C. Goodwin.
- 1063239 W. Gormally.
- 986208 J. Gorton.
- 649250 W. L. Gower.
- 1431510 T. B. Graves.
- 1440269 G. Gray.
- 1341878 M. Greenan.
- 1272992 B. J. Griffiths.
- 623530 W. J. L. Griffiths.
- 960057 F. Grinham.
- 1544494 J. H. Grubbs.
- 1164508 W. G. Guy.
- 1056921 J. E. Hall.
- 1246774 H. E. Hamilton.
- 1153258 J. C. Hammond.
- 969120 J. C. Harris.
- 1154758 R. L. Harris.
- 1429238 R. C. W. Harrison.
- 1274664 F. Hartley.
- 1267362 P. H. W. Haryott.
- 107391 Haughton.
- 1518850 H. Helliwell.
- 1102352 L. Henderson.
- 1260869 H. M. Henley.
- 1214534 J. T. Henson.
- 920069 C. A. Hermitage.
- 770967 M. F. Hicks.
- 1209833 A. A. J. Hill.
- 1417009 C. J. R. Hill.
- 1222508 L. L. Hill.
- 1142662 W. H. Hinton.
- 1319332 H. Hird.
- 945534 J. L. Hockney.
- 977875 J. Holton.
- 652864 W. Holton.
- 1119338 F. H. Housley.
- 1239787 J. E. Howden.
- 1045083 R. Huggan.
- 912662 E. J. Hughes.
- 1043187 W. P. Hughes.
- 1316768 J. Humphries.
- 1096627 D. B. Ibbeson.
- 1074313 J. Ivill
- 1075734 G. W. Jackson.
- 949906 W. Jackson.
- 929052 C. W. G. Jacques.
- 1551698 J. W. Jamieson.
- 1240905 G. A. January.
- 944463 C. Jarvis.
- 1170819 L. Jeanmonod.
- 1532867 W. L. Johnson.
- 1557665 W. Johnstons.
- 1042880 C. H. Kelly.
- 1459805 W. H. Kelly.
- 1357784 W. Kingstree.
- 932972 C. A. Lancaster.
- 1130402 J. T. W. Last.
- 978075 W. Lawson.
- 750240 R. Lee, RAFVR.
- 1124811 R. G. Ling.
- 1213400 F. L. Livesey.
- 771553 T. R. Loane.
- 992792 F. N. Lornie.
- 1441938 R. Reeve.
- 956466 J. Richardson.
- 1092913 N. Riley.
- 1000253 J. E. Rimmington.
- 1003517 J. Lowndes
- 1488182 J. D. Lumby.
- 1147711 F. Lupton.
- 1029483 J. Lyon.
- 16783 J. P. Mcardell.
- 1283457 E. M. Mccarthy.
- 1067009 A. P. McDonough.
- 951085 T. H. McEwan.
- 957231 J. W. McNaught.
- 1465159 N. A. Madgett.
- 577729 J. Manchester.
- 1211221 K. A. Manning.
- 510838 G. A. Marjorem.
- 1835998 A. H. Markwick.
- 1495888 J. A. Marriott.
- 646690 P. W. F. Marsh.
- 924207 M. V. Marshall.
- 625901 R. C. Mason.
- 1154507 S. G. Mason.
- 1112831 B. M. Mathison.
- 1500886 S. Meadows.
- 1529322 J. L. Meek.
- 998201 J. Meldrum.
- 1218230 J. R. Melhuish.
- 1202364 F. W. C. Millard.
- 949419 S. G. MlLlichamp.
- 1119145 R. A. Minns.
- 908256 E. F. Mitchell.
- 1256444 J. H. Mitchell.
- 900015 L. W. Moodie.
- 648874 K. S. Moore.
- 534572 J. M. Moran.
- 1101180 J. Morris.
- 1193737 G. W. Morton.
- 1359239 R. C. Neale.
- 1264145 W. Newberry.
- 1992075 S. Newton.
- 546280 V. F. Newton.
- 1525870 E. Noble.
- 1065939 R. O'Brien.
- 1233980 H. O'Callaghan.
- 1063063 D. Omerod.
- 1175786 J. O'Niell.
- 634266 P. O'Sullivan.
- 1287542 R. F. Palmer.
- 925665 R. F. Palmer.
- 1261780 A. A. Parry.
- 918714 W. O. Payne.
- 1034959 A. Pearson.
- 1202968 J. L. Pegram.
- 646244 R. Penhaligan.
- 526584 F. L. Perkins.
- 902570 H. G. Perrin.
- 1000352 A. J. Perrins.
- 1438597 F. W. Perry.
- 1009445 J. Pharaoh.
- 1205520 G. W. Philp.
- 576866 D. E. E. Porter.
- 1017185 J. J. Price.
- 1021951 S. J. Pye.
- 1281874 W. A. Rawlings.
- 1016670 G. H. Reed.
- 1164570 G. Rees.
- 1271706 A. Ring.
- 1248784 J. S. Robertson.
- 1514521 C. W. Robinson.
- 625534 R. G. Robinson.
- 622619 T. Robson.
- 909777 J. C. Rogers.
- 1064445 R. J. Rollason.
- 10378034 J. H. Roxby.
- 1552752 G. A. Roy.
- 1295496 F. J. Ryall.
- 613201 C. V. Sales.
- 1107026 G. F. Sanderson.
- 1209094 T. Satchwell.
- 1291083 A. J. Saunders.
- 1029941 G. Scrafton.
- 1702016 C. W. Selby.
- 1173087 D. W. Selby.
- 627897 J. S. Sergeant.
- 1531632 C. Shaw.
- 1235702 E. A. F. Sills.
- 947332 R. A. Simpson.
- 1120940 W. Slater.
- 1060318 G. W. Smart.
- 1031541 A. J. Smith.
- 1061090 C. M. Smith.
- 1205080 E. W. Smith.
- 1191127 F. R. Smith.
- 1111694 L. W. Smith.
- 1052723 R. H. Smith.
- 533128 J. Somerset.
- 968482 H. D. Southerst.
- 1359662 F. W. J. Spacey.
- 643463 J. G. Speed.
- 1216312 G. T. Spencer.
- 1287609 H. F. C. Staddon.
- 1527753 S. C. Stagg.
- 1443865 R. S. Steel.
- 340915 T. R. Stoaling.
- 1172048 H. Swift.
- 1111407 D. I. Tabernor.
- 771551 D. J. N. Tancred.
- 1355427 S. S. Tatton.
- 1030693 A. W. Taylor.
- 652885 V. J. Taylor.
- 956045 R. Thomas.
- 1366264 J. Thomson.
- 973924 W. H. Torrance.
- 1496614 H. Turner.
- 1454922 A. W. Twitchings.
- 793295 R. K. Tyte.
- 1136053 R. W. Valance.
- 1513616 A. Waddicor.
- 1257801 R. A. Wake.
- 1443762 A. E. Wakefield.
- 1181129 W. A. S. Wakefield.
- 1022051 A. R. Walker.
- 1162651 E. T. Walker.
- 1068122 J. A. Walker.
- 1097234 H. Ward.
- 1491982 W. Waters.
- 1551201 D. P. Watson.
- 956551 R. H. Watson.
- 1071115 M. Weightman.
- 1055594 P. R. Welton.
- 1200028 F. W. West.
- 1187989 G. J. Whatley.
- 1407460 J. H. W. White.
- 1510579 H. E. Wilkinson.
- 1178541 D. I. Williams.
- 1408217 S. E. G. Wills.
- 1550527 B. Wilson.
- 1053651 M. H. Wilson.
- 574768 R. P. Woodhouse.
- 1053736 H. Woods.
- 1015624 C. V. Woodward.
- 1527337 H. Worrall.
- 1408395 J. T. York.
- 1014432 F. Young.
- Can/R.101031 H. D. Tisdale, Royal Canadian Air Force.
- N.Z.413562 C. M. Glading, Royal New Zealand Air Force.

South African Air Force

Air Mechanics

- 210444 W. S. Clelland.
- 96220 G. H. Daniel.
- 74357 J. C. Easom.
- 142143 S. A. Howes.
- P.100996 W. J. Meyer.
- P.98289 J. A. Passe.
- P.6963 W. P. Schraader.
- P.5082 G. P. Thompson.
- P.5424 L. H. Zimmerman.

Aircraftmen 1st Class

- 1093263 W. H. Aldridge.
- 1066307 E. Alexander.
- 775162 M. H. Bechier.
- 1452574 C. J. Bedden.
- 975294 P. V. Bergin.
- 1248228 H. W. Blackburn.
- 1574846 T. Brown.
- 1534973 W. J. Burke.
- 856751 A. Clarke, AAF.
- 808321 H. A. Coppick, AAF.
- 1115240 R. J. Davies.
- 1526604 W. T. P. Davies.
- 1335957 D. J. Eagle.
- 1399850 R. E. Ebsworth.
- 1561398 J. B. Edgar.
- 1276220 W. Edwards.
- 1215221 G. H. Ellis.
- 1526258 H. L. Farmer.
- 1398470 A. Francis.
- 1452298 M. C. B. French.
- 1012113 A. C. Garlick.
- 1136704 J. F. Green.
- 1104084 L. K. Greenwood.
- 1249045 R. A. Guest.
- 1016577 J. Hattle.
- 1443148 V. G. Hawkins.
- 1073073 C. Holden.
- 1073076 S. R. Holmes.
- 623873 R. Humberstone.
- 1249070 C. R. Jacobs.
- 1526890 G. A. Kelly.
- 1242106 L. W. Knapton.
- 1043118 J. Lambert.
- 1088840 C. H. Lewis.
- 1576620 E. J. Luty.
- 548839 F. P. McCambridge.
- 1284363 L. E. Miller.
- 1176886 E. A. Peacock.
- 1488888 W. Pinnells.
- 1264834 R. F. J. Rockall
- 951182 J. Smart.
- 1088748 H. G. Smith.
- 1077218 I. J. Stockford.
- 1411440 W. Thomas.
- 1022707 G. A. Tonge.
- 1526620 C. F. Westall.
- 1027010 R. White.
- 1194435 W. Wilkinson.
- Can/R.121428 J. A. C. Corbeill, Royal Canadian Air Force.

Aircraftmen 2nd Class

- 1406704 J. B. Allwood.
- 1544095 A. Burns.
- 777449 A. Camilleri.
- 1528129 C. A. Evans.
- 2014055 B. Fawdrey.
- 1585178 C. A. Fear.
- 576973 E. J. Hawkins.
- 1044215 W. F. Punton.

Women's Auxiliary Air Force

Squadron Officers

- E. Taylor (81).
- M. H. Perkins (95) (Acting).

Flight Officers

- M. E. U. Allen (346).
- B. B. Emerson (1352).
- M. W. W. Ford (756).
- M. L. Holland (702).
- The Hon V. M. Lyttelton (529).
- M. E. G. Maclean (611).
- H. L. Manning (1463).
- C. M. Nicholls (189).
- E. M. W. Parkhurst (1407).
- S. Peek (812).
- E. F. Teece (1608).
- R. Westlake-Wood (1837).
- L. A. Wilson (491).
- M. H. R. Hayward (1550) (Acting).
- J. M. Hide (1707) (Acting).
- M. Liddell (704) (Acting).
- W. R. Morley (486) (Acting).
- J. L. E. Robinson (1606) (Acting).
- P. M. Wright (1760) (Acting).

Section Officers

- S. M. Adamson (4319).
- Y. P. Axon (1438).
- P. D. Borwick (2533).
- R. A. Crispin (4322).
- H. C. Gray (272).
- A. J. M. Marriott (3096).
- M. M. Martin (3717).
- M. M. Hay (3286).
- K. I. H. Hereward-Rogers (3366).
- E. McIlhagga (3112).
- J. M. Sowerby (1020).
- M. A. R. Tempest-Holmes (3397).
- B. Turner (3683).
- A. Wilson (733).
- B. M. Wilson (28,08).
- S. L. R. Wotherspoon (974).

Flight Sergeants

- 880825 G. M. Adams.
- 893325 J. E. Clements.
- 840754 H. S. Edney.
- 892641 L. A. M. Gerrish.
- 890327 M. Greaves.
- 883024 M. Mann.
- 466016 D. H. C. Petrie.
- 882083 M. Ridgeway.
- 884190 J. M. Scott.
- 889707 M. L. Trotman.

Sergeants

- 887700 A. M. Allen.
- 883163 D. Banks.
- 881028 E. M. Bellamy.
- 442428 M. F. Box.
- 890815 B. M. Boyd.
- 885205 J. K. Burfitt.
- 420087 J. Caridia.
- 883781 B. J. Clarke.
- 2049358 O. E. Clarkson.
- 2048025 D. A. C. Cozens.
- 888090 L. A. D. England.
- 893695 M. Eyers.
- 885041 K. H. Ferries.
- 440252 M. E. M. Griffiths.
- 890321 G. R. High.
- 895092 W. U. Hodgebrooks.
- 882096 J. Y. Holliday.
- 895650 G. Howe
- 895297 W. H. Hubble.
- 883239 M. B. Lang.
- 893167 S. G. Moore.
- 897125 S. R. Nuttall.
- 443872 M. P. Purkis.
- 894627 M. E. Rutherford.
- 886247 E. M. Schofield.
- 436297 M. Sharp.
- 2022075 M. M. S. Shellabear.
- 2023140 J. Sorrell.
- 452464 E. M. Taylor.
- 897805 V. E. Triffit.
- 423492 G. M. Twist.
- 895905 O. A. West.
- 886836 S. Young.

Corporals

- 2042615 C. K. Balloch.
- 430917 W. E. Barley.
- 446138 E. J. Bates.
- 885150 D. R. Blondell.
- 883418 B. E. Bugden.
- 436918 J. Buglass.
- 451077 J. C. Canby.
- 428851 D. M. Cartwright.
- 2068317 N. M. Cater.
- 443431 I. N. T. Colquhoun.
- 2004948 J. G. Dillon.
- 446139 J. M. Elias.
- 420310 J. I. Ellis.
- 420612 E. A. Everitt.
- 451127 S. A. Fillis.
- 440178 G. R. Foulser.
- 2042023 J. M. S. Galbraith.
- 428758 P. M. Gilbraith.
- 2066023 M. Heard.
- 441935 M. G. Hunt
- 445489 G. F. S. Johnson.
- 2085101 B. Lea.
- 896476 B. B. Lennon.
- 2023048 L. M. Locke.
- 440698 J. Maddocks.
- 894788 L. Mills.
- 2022665 L. C. Moon.
- 424864 P. Moorhouse.
- 896368 B. G. S. Morrison.
- 2012260 J. A. Neve.
- 432057 N. Outhart.
- 2001226 E. A. Partridge.
- 2018009 J. A. Penney.
- 2029310 M. E. Ralph.
- 887609 C. R. Raymond.
- 448261 M. P. Ridout.
- 422945 I. D. Robertson.
- 2040227 M. M. Robertson.
- 2091438 O. M. Scott.
- 420558 E. Skeen.
- 886724 L. Smailes.
- 443001 O. A. Sowden.
- 2001793 M. Stork.
- 420219 I. Styles.
- 452220 L. M. Tunmore.
- 2083613 D. Tuson.
- 441671 E. Weir.
- 420125 F. L. Wenlock.
- 444763 P. P. West.
- 427669 J. V. White.
- 446693 P. I. Wilby.
- 2005085 J. E. Tomlin (Acting).

Leading Aircraftwomen

- 890404 I. E. J. Abrahams.
- 2084568 A. Bailey.
- 2052201 D. Barron.
- 2051383 L. Belcher.
- 2048485 A. L. Binks.
- 2048277 F. Bradley.
- 2065338 F. R. Braun.
- 2022254 J. W. Bryant.
- 2028569 M. J. Cartaar.
- 2009651 M. L. Charter.
- 883794 D. G. Cook.
- 2053007 B. Davey.
- 2094609 L. M. Dawson.
- 451519 P. J. Durand.
- 2053652 M. I. Earl.
- 2068048 E. Edwards.
- 2004764 D. L. Egan.
- 2062856 M. I. Elliott.
- 2022791 E. R. Elsey.
- 2013041 P. G. Foster.
- 2068073 H. E. Gregory.
- 420838 M. Griffiths.
- 450854 F. J. Grout.
- 2023565 M. M. Hallows.
- 2096145 I. Hardacre.
- 443791 P. M. Hawkins.
- 2000553 G. M. Hern.
- 2088601 M. Howe.
- 2016306 F. L. Jackson.
- 471597 Y. E. Johnson.
- 456373 S. E. M. L. Jordan.
- 2022408 R. M. Lee.
- 894734 J. E. McWilton.
- 2062081 G. M. Mackley.
- 2002690 R. M. Marra.
- 2047991 J. D. J. Mill.
- 2004966 D. Mitchell-Dawson.
- 2013026 E. M. Morris.
- 2049788 M. W. Pennington.
- 428357 E. A. Pye.
- 2060051 E. M. Radford.
- 2030443 M. Read.
- 2025676 G. M. Roberts.
- 421512 J. S. Scott.
- 430812 P. M. E. Skilbeck.
- 438319 J. S. Snelling.
- 2026593 E. V. Steele.
- 2017829 A. I. A. Suter.
- 2069501 E. M. Thomas.

Aircraftwomen, 1st Class

- 2066341 D. I. Carpenter.
- 2061613 M. G. Davies.
- 453265 P. E. R. Emmerson.
- 2011457 M. M. Forward.
- 2018683 N. Johnson.
- 2083260 E. McHugh.
- 2081897 R. W. Moffat.
- 2027094 F. E. Palser.

Aircraftwomen, 2nd Class

- 2023288 J. N. Pope.
- 460705 E. Shaw.

Princess Mary's Royal Air Force Nursing Service

- Sister A. M. Alexander (5200).

South African Women's Auxiliary Air Force

Flight Sergeants

- F.46392 M. F. Donald.
- 46409 M. Hollinshead.
- F.46651 D. L. McDonald.

Air Sergeant

- P.46770 D. E. Burt.

Air Corporal

- F.47110 E. M. Ostlund.

=== King's Police and Fire Services Medal (KPFSM) ===
For Gallantry

England and Wales

- Stanley Wilson, Inspector, East Riding of Yorkshire Constabulary.
- Alexander Mackay, Detective Constable, Somersetshire Constabulary.
- Dennis Sturgess Court, Constable, Metropolitan Police Force.
- Charles Gordon Griffiths, Constable, Cardiff City Police Force.

Northern Ireland

- Michael Connor, Sergeant, Royal Ulster Constabulary.

Australia

- Archer Battersby Brown, Sergeant, 2nd Class, Queensland Police Force.
- Athol John Haines, Constable, Queensland Police Force.
- James Harold Seawright, Constable, Queensland Police Force.
- Frank James White, Constable, Queensland Police Force.

Newfoundland

- Clarence Bartlett, Constable, Newfoundland Constabulary.

For Distinguished Service

England and Wales

- Thomas Joseph Pey, OBE, Chief Constable, Wigan Borough Police Force.
- William James Hutchinson, Assistant Chief Constable, Sussex Constabulary.
- Luke Joseph Beirne, Assistant Chief Constable, Glamorganshire Constabulary.
- Leonard Charles Mason, Chief Inspector, Metropolitan Police Force.
- John Tilley, Chief Inspector, Liverpool City Police Force.
- Albert Cyril Barnes, DCM, Sub-Divisional Inspector, Metropolitan Police Force.
- Matthew Thomas Wright, Superintendent, Staffordshire Constabulary. Regional Police Staff Officer, Birmingham.
- Hartley Huddleston, MBE, Superintendent, East Riding of Yorkshire Constabulary.
- Robert Kidd, Chief Regional Fire Officer, No. 4 (Eastern) Region.
- James Samuel Nevill, Assistant Fire Force Commander, No. 16 (Southampton) Fire Force.
- Frederick Briddon, Divisional Officer, No. 3 (Sheffield) Fire Force.
- John Edwards, Senior Company Officer (part-time), No. 22 (North Wales) Fire Force.

Scotland

- Alexander Turpie, Superintendent and Deputy Chief Constable, Stirlingshire Constabulary.
- James Ross, Divisional Officer (Deputy Fire Force Commander), North-Eastern Fire Force.

Northern Ireland

- William Batten, Company Officer, Northern Ireland Fire Force.

Southern Rhodesia

- Major Henry Bugler, Assistant Commissioner, British South Africa Police.

India

- Sri Rao Sahib Gopala Ayyangar Raghava Ayyangar Devaraja Ayyangar, Deputy-Superintendent of Police, Madras.
- Sri Rao Sahib Dharmapuri Nanjunda Ayyar Gopala Ayyar, Deputy Superintendent of Police (Officiating), Madras.
- Henry John Dyer, Superintendent of Police, Bombay City.
- Babu Bimalapada Banarji, Deputy Superintendent of Police (CID), Bengal.
- Babu Ram Jatan Singh, Inspector of Police (CID), Bengal.
- Cyril Gordon Parsons, MC, Indian Police, Superintendent of Police, Agra, United Provinces.
- Hafiz Abdur Rashid Khan, Deputy Superintendent of Police, Peshawar, North West Frontier Province.
- Digby Benjamin Thomas Judge, Indian Police, District Superintendent of Police, Sukkur, Sind.
- Sardar Bahadur Sunder Singh, Inspector-General of Police, Benares State.

=== Colonial Police Medal (CPM) ===
Southern Rhodesia

- Captain Frederick William Harrison, Superintendent, British South Africa Police.
- Graham Sydney Ablitt Rolfe, Assistant Superintendent, British South Africa Police.

Colonies, Protectorates And Mandated Territories

- Mustafa Shefki Ahmet Effendi, lately Inspector, Cyprus Police Force.
- Frederick Thomas Akerman, Inspector, Palestine Police Force.
- Theodore Atamaroru, Sergeant, Kenya Police Force.
- Alan Malcolm Bell, Deputy Commissioner of Police, Mauritius.
- Walter James Bethell, Sergeant, Palestine Police Force.
- Captain George Thomas Whitmore Carr, Assistant Superintendent, Trinidad Police Force.
- Basil William Dundonald Cochrane, Superintendent, Kenya Police Force.
- Harold Charles Coles, Inspector, Palestine Police Force.
- Desmond Cleeve Connor, Inspector, Kenya Police Force.
- John Dougan, Sergeant, Palestine Police Force.
- Henri Andre Dupavillon, Assistant Superintendent, Mauritius Police Force.
- Charles Eric Duruty, MC, Superintendent, Gold Coast Police Force.
- Brian Haye Fox, Inspector, Palestine Police Force.
- Kurugu Frafra, Sergeant, Gold Coast Police Force.
- Harold Edward Gould, Sergeant, Palestine Police Force.
- Major Frederick Lindsay Hamilton, MC, Superintendent, Gold Coast Police Force.
- Marcel Hitie, Assistant Superintendent, Mauritius Police Force.
- Eric Bertram Humfrey, Deputy Commissioner of Police, Cyprus.
- Sydney Thomas Kelson, Inspector, Kenya Police Force.
- Joseph Cecil Ofuatey Kodjoe, Assistant Superintendent, Gold Coast Police Force.
- Harold Francis Ley, Inspector, Palestine Police Force.
- Robert Lustig, Inspector, Palestine Police Force.
- Denton Leopold Ethelbert Marshall, Sergeant, Barbados Police Force.
- Savas Pavlou, lately Inspector, Cyprus Police Force.
- John Hartley Pullman, Inspector, Palestine Police Force.
- Caesar Shellish, MBE, Superintendent, Cyprus Police Force.
- Hazara Singh, Asian Chief Inspector, Kenya Police Force.
- John Robert Tully, Inspector, Kenya Police Force.
- Montgomery Trevor Williams, Superintendent, Mauritius Police Force.

== Canada ==
=== Order of the Bath ===
==== Companion of the Order of the Bath (CB) ====
Military Division

Royal Canadian Navy

- Rear-Admiral George Clarence Jones.

Canadian Army

- Lieutenant-General Ernest William Sansom, DSO.
- Major-General William Henry Pferinger Elkins, CBE, DSO.
- Major-General George Randolph Pearkes, VC, DSO, MC.
- Major-General Lionel Frank Page, DSO.
- Major-General Frederic Frank Worthington, MC, MM.
- Major-General Charles Sumner Lund Hertzberg, MC, VD.

Royal Canadian Air Force

- Air Vice-Marshal George Owen Johnson, MC, (C.4).
- Air Vice-Marshal Robert Leckie, DSO, DSC, DFC, (C.11922).

=== Order of Saint Michael and Saint George ===
==== Companion of the Order of St Michael and St George (CMG) ====
- Oliver Mowat Biggar, KC, Ottawa, Chairman, Canadian Section, Permanent Joint Board on Defence; Director of Censorship.
- Henry Borden, KC, Toronto, Coordinator of Controls, Department of Munitions and Supply.
- Harry John Carmichael, St. Catharines, Ontario, Co-ordinator of Production, Department of Munitions and Supply.
- Samuel Laurence deCarteret, Montreal, Deputy Minister of National Defence for Air.
- The Reverend Henry John Cody, DD, LLD, FRSC, Toronto, President, University of Toronto.
- Colonel Henri DesRosiers, DSO, Montreal, Deputy Minister, Department of National Defence (Army).
- Pierre Depuy, London, England, Former First Secretary and Chargé d'Affaires, Canadian Legations to France, Belgium and the Netherlands.
- George Daniel Finlayson, Ottawa, Superintendent of Insurance.
- Robert Alexander Cecil Henry, Montreal, President, Defence Communications Ltd.
- Chalmers Jack Mackenzie, MC, DSc, LLD, FRSC, MEIC, Saskatoon, Acting President, National Research Council.
- The Reverend Mgr. Olivier Maurault, Montreal, Rector, University of Montreal.
- Wilfrid Gordon Mills, Toronto, Deputy Minister of National Defence for Naval Services.
- Wilder Graves Penfield, MD, FRSC, Montreal, Head of the Neurological Institute of Montreal.
- George Wilbur Spinney, Montreal, Chairman of the National War Finance Committee.
- Stuart Taylor Wood, Ottawa, Commissioner of the Royal Canadian Mounted Police.

=== Order of the British Empire ===
==== Commander of the Order of the British Empire (CBE) ====
Military Division

Royal Canadian Navy

- Rear-Admiral Victor Gabriel Brodeur.
- Rear-Admiral Leonard Warren Murray.

Canadian Army

- Major-General John Carl Murchie.
- Major-General Pierre Edouard Leclerc, MM, ED.
- Major-General Arthur Edwards Potts, ED.
- Brigadier Harold Oswald Neville Brownfield, MC.
- Brigadier Robert Marsden Luton, MC.
- Brigadier John Ernest Genet, MC.

Royal Canadian Air Force

- Air Vice-Marshal Wilfred Austin Curtis, DSC, (C.317).
- Air Commodore Arthur Lawrence Morfee (C.57).
- Air Commodore Anthony Lauderdale Paxton, DFC, Royal Air Force.
- Group Captain Charles Roy Slemon (C.71).

Civil Division

- Dr. A. E. Archer, Lamont, Alberta, President, Canadian Medical Association.
- Justine Beaubien, Montreal. Outstanding patriotic and philanthropic work.
- W. L. Best, Ottawa, Legislative Representative, Brotherhood of Locomotive Firemen and Enginemen.
- F. Philippe Brais, KC, MLC, Montreal.
- Charles Luther Burton, Toronto, Chairman, National War Services Advisory Board.
- Gladys Emily Campbell, OBE, Windsor, Ontario. Work of Canadian Red Cross Society.
- James Bertram Collip, MA, PhD, LLD, Montreal. President, The Royal Society of Canada.
- Douglas Dewar, Vancouver. Voluntary work of great importance for the Foreign Exchange Control Board and the Wartime Prices and Trade Board.
- Gertrude Webb Dunham, Havelock, New Brunswick, President, Federated Women's Institutes of Canada.
- David Holmwood Gibson, Toronto, President, Navy League of Canada.
- The Honourable Percy Hector Gordon, Regina. Chairman, Executive Committee of the Canadian Red Cross Society.
- Frederick Innes Ker, Hamilton, Publicist.
- Harvey Reginald MacMillan, BA, Vancouver, President, Wartime Merchant Shipping Ltd.
- Ernest Augustus Macnutt, Montreal. For leadership in patriotic and philanthropic work.
- Colonel Allan Angus Magee, DSO, KC, Montreal. For services (civil) with the Department of National Defence (Army).
- Tom Moore, Ottawa, President, Trades and Labour Congress of Canada.
- W. E. Phillips, London, Ontario, President, Research Enterprises Ltd.
- Adelaide Plumptre, Toronto, Vice-Chairman, Executive Committee, Canadian Red Cross Society, and in charge of Red Cross Inquiry Bureau, Ottawa.
- Frederic Henry Sexton, DSc, LLD, Halifax. Services in connection with technical training, Canadian Army.
- Mme. Rene Vautelet, Montreal. Patriotic and philanthropic work in Montreal.
- Alex Walker, Calgary, Dominion President, Canadian Legion of the British Empire Service League.

==== Officer of the Order of the British Empire (OBE) ====
Military Division

Royal Canadian Navy

- Captain Eric Sydney Brand.
- Surgeon Captain Archie McCallum, VD, MD, Royal Canadian Naval Volunteer Reserve.
- Commander Victor Percy Alleyne, (Royal Navy Retired).
- Commander George H. Griffiths, (Royal Navy Retired).
- Commander Arthur Roddy Pressey.
- Lieutenant-Commander Gerald Ormsby Baugh, Royal Canadian Naval Reserve.
- Lieutenant-Commander Robert Auburn Stewart MacNeil, Royal Canadian Naval Reserve.
- Lieutenant Ronald James Herman, Royal Canadian Naval Volunteer Reserve
- Lieutenant Reginald Ray Kenney, Royal Canadian Naval Reserve.

Canadian Army

- Major (acting Colonel) Malcolm Porter Jolley, Royal Canadian Ordnance Corps.
- Lieutenant-Colonel (acting Colonel) Thomas Holliday Musgrave, Royal Canadian Artillery.
- Lieutenant-Colonel (now Colonel) William Arthur Ives Anglin, MC, Royal Canadian Artillery.
- Lieutenant-Colonel (now Brigadier) James Frederic Alexander Lister, Royal Canadian Army Service Corps.
- Lieutenant-Colonel (acting Colonel) Arthur Stephen Pearson, ED, Canadian Infantry Corps.
- Lieutenant-Colonel (acting Colonel) Lorne Vernon Janes, Canadian Dental Corps.
- Lieutenant-Colonel (acting Colonel) William Edward Morgan, MC, Canadian Infantry Corps.
- Lieutenant-Colonel Baptist Leonard Johnston, VD, Canadian Infantry Corps.
- Lieutenant-Colonel Gideon Milroy Carrie, Royal Canadian Artillery.
- Lieutenant-Colonel Thomas Elijah Codlin, ED, Canadian Infantry Corps.
- Lieutenant-Colonel Herrold Lionel Cameron, Corps of Military Staff Clerks.
- Lieutenant-Colonel Cecil Homer Playfair, Royal Canadian Army Medical Corps.
- Lieutenant-Colonel Douglas Hinch Storms, MC, Corps of Royal Canadian Engineers.
- Lieutenant-Colonel Arthur Richard Roy, Canadian Infantry Corps.
- Lieutenant-Colonel Charles Louis Laurin, ED, Canadian Infantry Corps.
- Lieutenant-Colonel John Quinn Gillan, Royal Canadian Army Pay Corps.
- Lieutenant-Colonel George Edwin Beament, Royal Canadian Artillery.
- Lieutenant-Colonel Basil William George Grover, Royal Canadian Corps of Signals.
- Lieutenant-Colonel Louis Philip Paul Payan, Canadian Infantry Corps.
- Lieutenant-Colonel Ian Hugh Cumberland, Canadian Armoured Corps.
- Lieutenant-Colonel James Nahor Medhurst, ED, Canadian Infantry Corps.
- Lieutenant-Colonel Jean Emile Chaput, Canadian Infantry Corps.
- Major (acting Lieutenant-Colonel) John Russell McGillivray, Royal Canadian Ordnance Corps.
- Major Ernest John Read, General List.

Royal Canadian Air Force

- Wing Commander Edward Burnett Goodspeed (C.391).
- Wing Commander Walter Alyn Orr (C.146).
- Wing Commander Phillip Stuart Secord, (C.1246).
- Acting Wing Commander Normand Berry Littlejohn (32067), Reserve of Air Force Officers.
- Squadron Leader John Playfair Alexander (C.1272).
- Squadron Leader George Everett Wilson (C.1760).
- Squadron Officer Jean Flatt Davey (C.13578), RCAF Women's Division.

Civil Division

- Joseph Leonard Apedaile, Montreal, Financial Adviser, Civilian Flying School.
- Thomas Arnold, Montreal. For valuable public service as Machine Tool Controller, Department of Munitions and Supply.
- George Cecil Bateman, BSc, Toronto. For valuable public service as Metal Controller, Department of Munitions and Supply.
- Alan Brookman Beddoe, Ottawa, Artist, Books of Remembrance.
- Ralph Pickard Bell, Halifax, Director General, Aircraft Production Branch, Department of Munitions and Supply.
- J. H. Berry, Ottawa, Director General, Automobile and Tank Production Branch, Department of Munitions and Supply.
- Saidye Bronfman, Montreal. For patriotic and philanthropic work.
- Arthur Huntingdon Brown, Ottawa. For valuable public service in connection with the work of the Dependants Allowance Board.
- Ernest John Brunning, Ottawa, Director General, Ammunition and Gun Production Branch, Department of Munitions and Supply.
- Dr. Eli Franklin Burton, Toronto. For outstanding service to Scientific Research.
- Mme. J. C. L. Bussiere, Quebec. For patriotic and philanthropic work.
- A. Hector Cadieux, Montreal. For valuable public services in connection with the protective service. Head, Canadian Pacific Railway Police.
- Peter S. Campbell, MD, CM, Halifax, Medical Officer, Public Health Department, Nova Scotia.
- D. B. Carswell, Ottawa. For valuable public service as Controller of Ship Repair and Salvage, Department of Munitions and Supply.
- John Ballantyne Carswell, BSc, MInstCE, MEIC, Ottawa, Director General, Washington Office, Department of Munitions and Supply.
- George R. Cotterelle, Toronto. For valuable public service as Oil Controller, Department of Munitions and Supply.
- Robert Davies Defries, MD, Toronto. For outstanding service in Medical Research.
- George Derby, Vancouver. For patriotic and philanthropic work.
- His Honour Judge Eugene DesRiviers, Quebec City, Quebec. For valuable service to the Canadian Army.
- David Campbell Dick, BA, Toronto. For valuable public service as Wool Administrator, War Time Price and Trade Board.
- James Richardson Donald, BA, BSc, Ottawa, Director General, Chemical and Explosives Production Branch, Department of Munitions and Supply.
- John Eaton, Montreal, Director General, General Purchasing Branch, Department of Munitions and Supply.
- Dr. William Harmon Fairfield, Lethbridge, Alberta. For valuable service to Scientific Research in Agriculture.
- Reverend Antoine Gagnon, Rimouski, Quebec. For valuable service to the Canadian Army.
- Frederick Pearce Gavin, Hamilton. For valuable public service in connection with technical training in the Canadian Army.
- Lieutenant-Colonel Goodwin Gibson, Ottawa, Real Estate Adviser, Department of National Defence.
- Lieutenant-Colonel Thomas Guerin, Montreal. For patriotic and philanthropic work.
- Lieutenant-Colonel Walter Archibald Harrison, MC, VD, Saint John, Executive Assistant to the Minister of Munitions and Supply.
- George Hugh Henderson, Halifax. For valuable scientific work in connection with the Royal Canadian Navy.
- George Hodge, Montreal. For valuable public service as a Member of the National Labour Board Committee, representing Employers.
- Gordon Bennett Johnson, Glasgow, Scotland. Canadian Trade Commissioner. For valuable public service, more particularly in relation to the care of survivors of the torpedoed steamship Athenia.
- Ray Lawson, Montreal, Chairman, Federal Aircraft Ltd. For valuable public service in connection with the production of aircraft.
- A. Lesage, MD, Montreal. Dean, Faculties of Medicine, University of Montreal. For valuable services to medical research.
- Marion Lindeburgh, Montreal, President, Canadian Nurses Association.
- H. W. Lothrop, Ottawa, Associate Clerk, Privy Council Office.
- Andrew L. W. MacCallum, Montreal, Chairman of the Canadian Shipping Board.
- J. McClelland, Valois, Quebec, Member of the National War Labour Board Committee. For valuable public service as Employers Representative.
- Dr. Hector John Macleod, Vancouver. For valuable public service in connection with Scientific Research.
- Dr. W. P. J. MacMillan, Charlottetown. For patriotic and philanthropic work.
- Reverend Arthur Maheux, Quebec. For patriotic work.
- John Philip Davy Malkin, Vancouver, Director General, General Purchasing Branch, Department of Munitions and Supply.
- Mme. Almanda Marchand, Ottawa, President, Federation of French-Canadian Women.
- Leslie J. Martin, Vancouver, Manager, Civilian Flying Training School.
- John Thomas Miner, Kingsville, Ontario. For scientific work in connection with Natural History and conservation of wild life.
- Frederick Keenan Morrow, Toronto. For patriotic and philanthropic work.
- Cecil W. Nicholl, Winnipeg. For valuable public service in connection with the Organisation of a Civilian Flying Training School.
- Solomon Randolph Noble, Montreal. For valuable public service as Sugar Administrator, War Time Price and Trade Board.
- K. B. Palmer, Toronto, General Counsel, Department of Munitions and Supply.
- T. W. S. Parsons, Victoria, Commissioner, British Columbia Provincial Police. For valuable services in connection with the Protective Service.
- John Paterson, Halifax, Superintendent, Halifax Shipyard Ltd. For valuable public service in connection with the repair, equipment and salvage of HM Canadian ships and those of the Royal Navy and Allied Governments.
- John Patterson, MA, FRSC, Toronto, Controller, Transport Section, Meteorological Service. Also for valuable public service in connection with aviation.
- Thomas Peacock, Hamilton. For patriotic and philanthropic work.
- Léon Raymond, Maniwaki, Quebec. For patriotic and philanthropic work.
- Rupert Camborn Reece, Winnipeg. For patriotic and philanthropic work.
- Dr. Guilford Bevil Reed, Kingston, Ontario. For outstanding service in the field of Scientific Research.
- Murton A. Seymour, KC, St. Catharines, Ontario, President, Canadian Flying Club Association. Valuable public service in connection with development of aviation.
- George A. Shea, Montreal. For valuable public service in connection with the Protective Service. Head of Canadian National Railways Police.
- Dr. Allan Goodrich Shenstone, Ottawa. For valuable public service in the field of Scientific Research.
- Joseph Simard, Sorel, Quebec. For valuable service in connection with the production of munitions.
- Captain Thomas Farrar Smellie, Canadian SS Nascopic, c/o Department of Mines and Resources, Ottawa.
- Captain J. B. Smith, Vancouver. For outstanding public service in connection with the Merchant Marine.
- D. Stairs, Ottawa, Director General, Defence Project Construction Branch, Department of Munitions and Supply.
- William H. Stringer, Toronto. For valuable public service in connection with the Protective Service. Commissionaire, Ontario Provincial Police.
- Léon Trépanier, Montreal. For valuable service to the Canadian Army.
- Charles R. Troup, Westmount, Quebec, Chief Supervisor, 6th Air Observer School. For valuable public service in connection with aviation.

==== Member of the Order of the British Empire (MBE) ====
Military Division

Royal Canadian Navy

- Chief Skipper James Watson Wagner, Royal Canadian Naval Reserve.
- Acting Skipper Boatswain William C. G. Pett.
- Coxswain William James Thomas, Royal Canadian Naval Reserve (Fisherman's Reserve).
- Warrant Master-at-Arms Wilfred Pember.
- Warrant Supply Officer John Shaw.
- Warrant Shipwright William Douglas Leach.

Canadian Army

- Major (now Lieutenant-Colonel) Gavin Paterson Henderson, Canadian Infantry Corps.
- Major (acting Lieutenant-Colonel) Hubert Murray Jones, Canadian Infantry Corps.
- Major (acting Lieutenant-Colonel) John Clifford Richardson, Royal Canadian Army Medical Corps.
- Major (acting Lieutenant-Colonel) Herbert James Beard, Royal Canadian Army Pay Corps.
- Major Arthur Carman Singleton, Royal Canadian Army Medical Corps.
- Major Edward Charles Armstrong, Canadian Infantry Corps.
- Major George Christian Bloomfield, Canadian Postal Corps.
- Major Gordon Thomson Cassels, MC, Royal Canadian Artillery.
- Major Ossory Luxton McCullough, ED, Canadian Infantry Corps.
- Major Charles Mills Drury, Royal Canadian Artillery.
- Major Harold Brownlee Stuart, Corps of Royal Canadian Engineers.
- Major Howard Leroy Armstrong, ED, Royal Canadian Artillery.
- Captain (acting Major) James Malcolm McAvity, Canadian Armoured Corps.
- Major Charles Goguel, Royal Canadian Artillery.
- Major John Dewitte Relyea, Royal Canadian Ordnance Corps.
- Major James Duncan Wilson, MC, Royal Canadian Corps of Signals.
- Major Emil Francis Schmidlin, Canadian Armoured Corps.
- Major Charles Dufour, Canadian Infantry Corps.
- Major Herbert Charles Seagrim, Royal Canadian Army Service Corps.
- Captain (acting Major) Denton Donald Stewart, Canadian Infantry Corps.
- Major Lester Kastner Ash, Royal Canadian Army Service Corps.
- Captain (acting Major) Harry George Filmer Morgan, Royal Canadian Ordnance Corps.
- Captain John Joseph Mildenberger, Canadian Infantry Corps.
- Honorary Captain (acting Honorary Major) Michael Joseph Dalton, Canadian Chaplain Services.
- Honorary Captain (acting Honorary Major) Raymond McCleary, Canadian Chaplain Services.
- Captain (Quartermaster) Arthur Hilton, Canadian Armoured Corps.
- Captain (Quartermaster) Ernest Frederick Wilson, Canadian Infantry Corps.
- Captain (Quartermaster) Samuel Edouard Methot, Canadian Infantry Corps.
- Captain Harrison George DeMorest, Corps of Royal Canadian Engineers.
- Captain Lloyd Montagu Byron, Royal Canadian Artillery.
- Lieutenant (acting Captain) Francis Edmond Moynihan, Royal Canadian Corps of Signals.
- Captain Charles Franklin Egan, Royal Canadian Army Medical Corps.
- Captain William Robert Grattan Holt, Canadian Infantry Corps.
- Captain Fred Leaman, Royal Canadian Army Service Corps.
- Lieutenant (acting Captain) Isaac Tucker Burr, Canadian Infantry Corps.
- Lieutenant Thomas Laird Alexander, Canadian Infantry Corps.
- Lieutenant Gerard Guy Charron, Canadian Infantry Corps.
- P.38185 Warrant Officer Class I Staff Sergeant-Major Ernest Roy Dickson, Corps of Military Staff Clerks.
- B.60512 Warrant Officer Class I Regimental Sergeant-Major Martin John Richard Barker, Canadian Armoured Corps.
- P.8463 Warrant Officer Class I Regimental Sergeant-Major George Douglas Gilpin, Royal Canadian Artillery.
- B.24064 Warrant Officer Class I Regimental Sergeant-Major William James, Canadian Infantry Corps.
- C.41965 Warrant Officer Class I Regimental Sergeant-Major Hugh McCallum, Canadian Provost Corps.
- P.20544 Warrant Officer Class I Regimental Sergeant-Major Sidney Mitchell, Canadian Infantry Corps.
- B.87750 Warrant Officer Class I Regimental Sergeant-Major James Robertson, Royal Canadian Artillery.
- D.82943 Warrant Officer Class I Acting Regimental Sergeant-Major Alexander Sawers, Canadian Infantry Corps.
- C.28855 Warrant Officer Class I Sergeant-Major Harold Edwards Alford, Corps of Military Staff Clerks.
- P.10145 Warrant Officer Class I Sergeant-Major Stanley Frank Hildred, Corps of Royal Canadian Engineers.
- P.27736 Warrant Officer Class I Sergeant-Major William McKay, Royal Canadian Army Service Corps.
- P.10654 Warrant Officer Class I Sergeant-Major John Gilchrist McRae, Corps of Royal Canadian Engineers.
- A.29112 Warrant Officer Class I Armament Sergeant-Major Paul Philippe Comeau, Royal Canadian Ordnance Corps.
- L.10186 Warrant Officer Class I acting Sergeant-Major Ronald Argyle Dundee MacFarlane, Royal Canadian Artillery.
- P.48067 Warrant Officer Class I Regimental Sergeant-Major Xavier George Armand Gravel, Canadian Infantry Corps.
- C.269 Warrant Officer Class II Battery Sergeant-Major Clarence Edward Sparks, Royal Canadian Artillery.
- H.56337 Warrant Officer Class I Sergeant-Major Neil Galbraith, Canadian Forestry Corps.
- F.44614 Warrant Officer Class II Company Sergeant-Major David MacLellan, Canadian Infantry Corps.
- P.839 Warrant Officer Class II Regimental Quartermaster-Sergeant Wilfred Jewkes, Canadian Armoured Corps.
- H.50507 Warrant Officer Class II Quartermaster-Sergeant Frederick Lachlan McLeod, Royal Canadian Army Medical Corps.
- L.12337 Warrant Officer Class III Platoon Sergeant-Major Royden Harrison Howe, Canadian Infantry Corps.

Royal Canadian Air Force

- Squadron Leader Cameron Jamieson Campbell (C.1414).
- Squadron Leader Clarence Melbourne Clucas (C.2540).
- Squadron Leader Harry Rattray Low (C.3783).
- Squadron Leader Angus Clayton McClaskey (C.3179).
- Squadron Leader Guy McRae Minard (C.2114).
- Squadron Leader Edward Enos Smith (C.3354).
- Acting Squadron Leader Frank Edward Groom (35229), Royal Air Force.
- Acting Squadron Leader John Sherard Widdows (85131), Royal Air Force Volunteer Reserve.
- Flight Lieutenant Frederick John Shillitoe Garratt (C.6527).
- Flight Lieutenant William Harvey Hawkins (C.4161).
- Acting Flight Lieutenant Ronald Arlett (63851), Royal Air Force Volunteer Reserve.
- Flying Officer Norman Jones (C.10526).
- Flying Officer Robert McDonald Williams (C.6554).
- Flying Officer Edward Kitchener Williamson (101596), Royal Air Force Volunteer Reserve.
- Warrant Officer Class I Sidney Charles Awcock (961).
- Warrant Officer Class I James Henry Blundell (R.56724).
- Warrant Officer Class I William Glenn Comrie (1249).
- Warrant Officer Class II Roy Leon Chalmers (4191).
- Warrant Officer Class II Joseph Edward Henri Gowsell (9553).

Civil Division

- Thomas A. Brown, Hamilton, Ontario, Chief Constable, Protective Service.
- Martin J. Bruton, Regina, Chief Constable, Protective Service.
- T. W. Bullock, Ottawa, Chief Auditor, Income Tax Division, Department of National Revenue.
- Reverend R. J. Burton, Calgary. For patriotic and philanthropic work.
- Ross Duff Butterill, Dunnville, Ontario. For valuable public service as civilian Meteorological Officer, British Commonwealth Air Training Plan.
- Dr. Adrian Cambron, Ottawa. For valuable service in the field of scientific research.
- Margaret R. Cameron, RN, Hamilton, Matron in Charge, Mountain Sanitarium.
- Gwendolin Carrington, Quebec. For patriotic and philanthropic work, North Shore St. Lawrence Mission.
- Georges Cecil Carter, Montreal. For valuable public service in connection with the production of munitions.
- Reverend Mother Ste. Jeanne de Chantal, Quebec, Mother Superior, Hotel Dieu Hospital.
- Fulgence Charpentier, Ottawa. For public service as Chief Censor of Publications.
- J. L. Clark, Rustico, Prince Edward Island For valuable service to agriculture.
- Thomas Clark, Windsor, Collector of Customs. For very meritorious service in the Department of National Revenue.
- G. H. Clarke, Vancouver, District Director, Postal Services.
- Dr. W. K. Colbeck, Welland, Ontario. For patriotic and philanthropic work.
- Charles A. Collins, Halifax, Collector of Customs. Meritorious service in the Department of National Revenue.
- E. N. Compton, Toronto, Conciliation Officer and District Representative, Department of Labour.
- F. G. Adams, Toronto. For valuable service in connection with the production of munitions.
- Andrew Anderson, Innisfail, Alberta. For valuable service to agriculture.
- Mme. J. O. Asselin, Montreal. For patriotic and philanthropic work.
- Captain W. J. Balcom, Halifax. For valuable public service in connection with navigation.
- Captain L. C. Barry, Victoria. For valuable service in the Merchant Navy.
- John Thomas Beanlands, Halifax. For valuable public service in connection with the repair of ships of war of the Royal Canadian Navy, Royal Navy and Allied Governments.
- John William Bell, Ottawa. For scientific research.
- Marjorie Bell, Toronto. For patriotic and philanthropic work.
- Antoine Miville Belleau, Ottawa. For valuable public service as Chief Translator.
- A. Birtwhistle, Charlottetown, Prince Edward Island, Chief Constable, Protective Service.
- Frederick Bishop, Paradise, Nova Scotia. For valuable service in connection with agriculture.
- E. C. Black, Ottawa. For valuable public service in connection with scientific research.
- M. Blackwood, Edmonton, Chief Constable, Protective Service.
- Captain J. A. Bourgault, Montreal. For patriotic and philanthropic work in connection with the Department of Pensions and National Health.
- P. E. S. Brodeur, Ottawa. Long and distinguished service in the Department of National Revenue.
- Ralph Phelps Brown, Ottawa, Financial Controller, Department of National Defence (Army).
- Mary H. Conquest, Edmonton. For patriotic and philanthropic work.
- Judson C. Conrod, Halifax, Chief Constable, Protective Service.
- J. B. Corley, Calgary, District Director, Postal Services.
- P. J. McTaggart-Cowan, Montreal. For valuable work in connection with air transportation under the Department of Transport.
- Dr. P. A. Creelman, Charlottetown, Head of the Tubercular Service, Prince Edward Island.
- Reverend Sister Decarie, Montreal, Matron-in-Charge, Notre Dame Hospital.
- Albert R. Decary, Quebec. For meritorious service as Superintending Engineer, Department of Public Works.
- James Douglas, Caledonia, Ontario. For valuable service to agriculture.
- C. W. Downer, Saskatoon, Brigade Commissioner, St. John Ambulance Association for the Deaf.
- Fernand Dufresne, Montreal, Chief Constable, Protective Service.
- Wilfred Eggleston, Ottawa, Chief Telegraph Censor and one of the Censors of Publications.
- Captain Reginald Featherstone, Halifax. For valuable service in connection with the production of shipping.
- Edith Fenton, RN, Ottawa. For meritorious work in the St. John Ambulance Association.
- Reginald Hugh Field, Ottawa. For valuable public service in connection with Scientific Research.
- Ruth Fleming, Montreal. For patriotic and philanthropic work.
- John Foggie, Winnipeg. For meritorious service as Chief Provincial Sanitary Inspector.
- Albert Gagnon, Ottawa. For meritorious service as one of the Chief Postal Censors.
- D. M. Galloway, Toronto, Co-ordinator of Production, Toronto District Engineer Office, Department of Munitions and Supply.
- L. Germain, Montreal, District Director, Postal Services.
- Carlyle Gerow, Ottawa, Director of Supply Administration, Department of National Defence for Air.
- A. M. Gibson, Toronto, District Director, Postal Services.
- George Hamilton Gooderham, Gleichen, Alberta. For meritorious service as an Indian Agent.
- George Richard Gotts. For meritorious service in the Offices of the High Commissioner for Canada, London, England.
- John Joseph Green, PhD, Ottawa. For valuable public service in the field of scientific research.
- Josephine Hanway, Halifax. For patriotic and philanthropic work.
- William H. Hargrave, Calgary, Senior Assistant Civil Engineer. For meritorious work for the Department of National Defence for Air.
- F. E. Harrison, Vancouver, Senior Labour Conciliation Officer, Department of Labour.
- Ruth Harvey, Ottawa, Head of the Welfare Section, Dependents Allowance Board.
- Dr. John T. Henderson, Ottawa. For valuable public service in the field of scientific research.
- R. W. Hendry, Halifax, Port Manager. For meritorious service in connection with shipping.
- Henry Hereford, Ottawa, Chief Registrar of Employment Department of Labour. Meritorious service in connection with the Department of Labour.
- Alexandra Wrightson Hogg, Winnipeg. For patriotic and philanthropic work.
- C. H. Hosterman, Halifax, Marine Agent, Transport Department. For meritorious work in connection with shipping, Port of Halifax.
- Dr. Leslie E. Howlett, Ottawa. For valuable public service in the field of scientific research.
- Captain A. Hubley, Montreal. Meritorious work in the Merchant Navy.
- William Hudson, Kenton, Manitoba. For valuable service to agriculture.
- Byron I. Johnson, New Westminster, British Columbia For meritorious work as Technician Adviser to the Air Training Plan.
- Isabella Moodie Johnston. For meritorious service at the Canadian Military Headquarters, London, England.
- Francis Everett Jolliffe, Ottawa. For meritorious service as one of the Chief Postal Censors.
- George J. Klein, Ottawa. For valuable public service in the field of scientific research.
- J. Herve Lacroix, Montreal. For meritorious service as Secretary, Citizens' Advisory Committee, City of Montreal, for the Canadian Army.
- Dr. Paul C. Laporte, Edmundston. For patriotic and philanthropic work.
- Henri Laurendeau, Montreal. For patriotic and philanthropic work.
- Elsie J. Lawson, Ottawa, Chief Reviewer, Dependents, Board of Trustees.
- Thomas Lawson, Ottawa. For meritorious service in the Department of Finance.
- Captain Harold H. Leather, Hamilton. For patriotic and philanthropic work.
- Mrs. Douglas Lindsey, Hamilton. For patriotic and philanthropic work.
- Elsie B. Little, Halifax, Lady District Superintendent, St. John Ambulance Association.
- Miss E. E. Love, Fort San, Saskatchewan, Matron, Fort Qu'appelle Sanitarium.
- A. D. McCall, Montreal, Allied War Supplies Controllers Department. For valuable work in connection with the production of munitions.
- John Alexander Douglas McCurdy, Ottawa, Superintendent, Purchasing Division, Aircraft Production Branch, Department of Munitions and Supply.
- Thomas McCusker, Regina. For valuable service to agriculture.
- P. J. McEwen, Wyoming, Ontario. For valuable service to agriculture.
- Dr. Robert L. McIntosh, Ottawa. For valuable public service in the field of scientific research.
- Donald McKay, Vancouver, Chief Constable, Protective Service.
- Miss M. Mackintosh, Ottawa, Chief of the Bureau of Labour Legislation, Department of Labour.
- Horace E. McLeese, Saint John, New Brunswick, Chief Constable, Protective Service.
- Joanna MacLellan, Toronto. For patriotic and philanthropic work.
- Captain Duncan MacLeod, Montreal. For valuable service under trying circumstances in the Canadian Merchant Navy.
- L. B. McMillan, Charlottetown. For valuable public service over a long period of years in the Civil Service, Prince Edward Island.
- Edna McMurray, Fredericton. For patriotic and philanthropic work.
- Edward McNally, Ottawa. For valuable work over many years as Dominion Inspector of Excise.
- C. A. MacVey, Fredericton. For long and valuable service in the Civil Service, Province of New Brunswick.
- H. R. Malley, Ottawa, Director of the Ammunition Division, Ammunition and Gun Production Branch, Department of Munitions and Supply.
- Dr. John Gordon Malloch, Ottawa. For valuable public service in the field of scientific research.
- Harold Ernest Maple, Ottawa, Chief Designing Engineer, Quarter-Master General's Branch, Department of National Defence (Army).
- Albert Honore Mathieu, Ottawa. For valuable public service as Assistant Deputy Custodian under the Trading with the Enemy Regulations.
- Frederick Charles Middleton, MD, Regina. For valuable work as Secretary, Saskatchewan Cancer Clinic Service.
- J. G. Morrow, Ottawa, Special Consultant on Steel, Department of Munitions and Supply.
- Bessie Morton, Halifax. For patriotic and philanthropic work.
- T. P. Murphy, Ottawa, Superintendent, Equipment and Supply Branch, Post Office Department.
- R. R. Ness, Howick, Quebec. For valuable service to agriculture.
- W. A. Newman, Montreal, President, Federal Aircraft Ltd. For valuable work in connection with the production of aircraft.
- C. W. Noble, Nobleford, Alberta. For valuable service to agriculture.
- Midd Jean Oddie, Regina, Director, Province of Saskatchewan Junior Red Cross.
- Chief Engineer Maurice O'Hara, Montreal. Valuable work under trying circumstances in the Merchant Navy.
- J. E. Openshaw, Ottawa, Chief Controller, Cartridge and Fuze Division, Ammunition and Gun Production Branch, Department of Munitions and Supply.
- Lieutenant-Colonel The Reverend Cecil Caldbeck Owen, Vancouver, Senior Chaplain, Shaughnessy Hospital.
- Chief Engineer H. J. Owen, Vancouver. For valuable service under trying conditions in the Merchant Navy.
- H. R. Patrick. For valuable work in the Offices of the High Commissioner for Canada, London, England.
- Isabel Pepall, Toronto, Ontario Commissioner for the Red Cross Home Nursing Corps.
- Reverend Sister Mary Philips, Vancouver, Mother Superior, St. Paul's Hospital.
- Dr. Lloyd M. Pidgeon, Ottawa. For valuable public service in the field of scientific research.
- Charles Sidney Pipe, Ottawa, Controller of Ordnance Accounts, Master General of Ordnance Branch, Department of National Defence (Army).
- Arthur Poundsford, Port Arthur. For patriotic and philanthropic work.
- E. A. Pridham, Winnipeg. For long and efficient service in the Civil Service, Province of Manitoba.
- E. McG. Quirk, Montreal, Conciliation Officer, Department of Labour.
- Mme. L. A. Richard, Ste-Petronille, Ile d'Orleans, Quebec. For patriotic and philanthropic work.
- Merrill C. Robinson, Vancouver, President, National Institute for the Blind. For valuable work in connection with the Department of National Defence (Army).
- A. I. Ross, Halifax, Senior Steam Ship Inspector, Halifax Department of Transport. For valuable work under trying conditions, Port of Halifax.
- Dr. James Hamilton Ross, Ottawa. For valuable public service in the field of scientific research.
- Elizabeth Rousseau, RN, Montreal, Head of Nursing Service, St. John Ambulance Association, Province of Quebec.
- Isaie Savard, Montreal, Inspector, Department of National Revenue, Montreal. For long and meritorious service in the Departof National Revenue.
- Sam Shannon, Cloverdale, British Columbia For valuable service to agricultural research.
- Ronald Sharp, Ottawa, Chief of Income Tax. For meritorious service in the Department of National Revenue.
- F. L. Skinner, Dropmore, Manitoba. For valuable service to agriculture.
- Captain F. C. Slocombe, Toronto, Examinor of Masters and Mates. For valuable service to the Merchant Navy.
- George Smith, Winnipeg, Chief Constable, Protective Service.
- James Fyfe Smith, Vancouver, Provincial President, St. John Ambulance Association.
- J. J. Smith, Regina. For long and meritorious service in the Civil Service, Province of Saskatchewan.
- Archibald Spire. For valuable public service in the Offices of the High Commissioner for Canada, London, England.
- William Booth Stuart, Ottawa, Superintendent of Excise and Tax Collection. For long and valuable public service in the Department of National Revenue.
- Dr. A. Marguerite Swan, Winnipeg, Chairman of the Manitoba Nutrition Committee.
- R. Grant Thompson, Armstrong, British Columbia For valuable service to agriculture.
- Leslie Rielle Thomson, BASc, Ottawa, Special Liaison Officer, Department of Munitions and Supply.
- A. S. Tindale, Ottawa, Controller, Department of Munitions and Supply.
- N. Torno, Toronto, Senior Officer, Canadian Fire Fighters. For service in Great Britain. A voluntary worker.
- Luce Tremblay, Chicoutimi, Quebec, District Nurse.
- E. Trowbridge, Edmonton. For long and valuable service in the Civil Service, Province of Alberta.
- Pierre Turgeon, St. Anselme, Quebec. For valuable service to agriculture.
- W. E. Uren, Ottawa, Director General, Priorities Branch, Department of Munitions and Supply.
- Captain George Walsh, Montreal. For valuable service under trying conditions in the Merchant Navy.
- Arthur Lewis Watson, Ottawa. For long and valuable service as Assistant Secretary General, Canadian Battlefield Memorial Commission, and Assistant Secretary General, Imperial War Graves Commission.
- Dr. S. Wheeler, Rosthern, Saskatchewan. For valuable service to agriculture.
- W. F. Williams, Ottawa, Associate Financial Adviser, Department of Munitions and Supply.
- E. M. Woollcombe, Halifax. For valuable service in connection with shipbuilding.
- Dr. George F. Wright, Ottawa. For valuable public service in the field of scientific research.

=== Companion of the Imperial Service Order (ISO) ===
- Arthur Stanley Barnstead, BA, LLD, Deputy Provincial Secretary and Clerk of the Executive Council, Halifax, Nova Scotia.
- Avila Bedard, Deputy Minister of Lands and Forests, Quebec.
- Frederick Charles Blair, Director of Immigration, Department of Mines and Resources.
- Charles F. Buhner, Clerk of the Executive Council, Toronto, Ontario.
- Henry Cathcart, Deputy Minister of Lands of the Province of British Columbia.
- Peter T. Coolican, Assistant Deputy Postmaster General.
- John Joseph Heagerty, MD, CM, Director, Public Health Services, Department of Pensions and National Health.
- John Goodwill MacPhail, Director, Marine Services, Department of Transport.
- Hugh Denyes Paterson, Inspector of Income Tax for the Toronto District.
- Domitien Thomas Robichaud, Superintendent, Bureau for Translations, Department of the Secretary of State.

=== British Empire Medal (BEM) ===
Military Division

Royal Canadian Navy

- Chief Petty Officer W. L. Harding, Royal Canadian Naval Reserve, O.N. A-831.
- Chief Petty Officer James A. Taylor, Royal Canadian Naval Reserve, O.N. A-4419.
- Chief Petty Officer H. G. Wood, Royal Canadian Navy, O.N.2229.
- Supply Chief Petty Officer Frederick C. Bingham, Royal Canadian Navy, O.N.2641.
- Master-at-Arms Samuel James Kennard, Royal Canadian Navy, O.N. X-41031.
- Acting Chief Engine Room Artificer James Paterson, Royal Canadian Naval Reserve, O.N. A-1332.
- Acting Chief Plumber John W. Pelham, Royal Canadian Navy, O.N.40657.
- Petty Officer Victor Billard, Royal Canadian Naval Reserve, O.N. A-979.
- Petty Officer Allen Bradbury, Royal Canadian Navy, O.N. X-41027.
- Petty Officer Norman C. C. Roberts, Royal Canadian Naval Reserve, O.N. A-817.
- Stoker Petty Officer Douglas C. Fisher, Royal Canadian Naval Volunteer Reserve, O.N. V-11630.
- Stoker Petty Officer J. A. Wilson, Royal Canadian Naval Volunteer Reserve, O.N. V-2574.
- Supply Petty Officer A. E. Taylor, Royal Canadian Naval Volunteer Reserve, O.N. V-6400.
- Leading Steward Fred W. Peterson, Royal Canadian Naval Reserve, O.N. A-2758.
- Acting Leading Seaman C. M. Chapman, Royal Canadian Naval Reserve, O.N. A-632.
- Telegraphist John Driver Campbell, Royal Canadian Navy, O.N.4281.
- Able Seaman E. E. Binnie, Royal Canadian Navy, O.N.3820.

Canadian Army

- F.40718 Private Bradford Elliott Avery, Canadian Infantry Corps.
- D.125307 Corporal Urgal Belisle, Canadian Provost Corps.
- G.3665 Gunner (acting Corporal) William Frederick Byrne, Royal Canadian Artillery.
- M.7272 Sapper Collin Andrew Cavil, Corps of Royal Canadian Engineers.
- P.16132 Sergeant Robert Wilson Clark, Royal Canadian Corps of Signals.
- D.59011 Sergeant Alcide Clavet, Canadian Infantry Corps.
- G.16510 Sergeant Ronald Abram Craft, Royal Canadian Corps of Signals.
- B.76914 Gunner Albert Reid Fielding, Royal Canadian Artillery.
- M.42643 Sergeant John Wesley Gillespie, Canadian Military Forces.
- M.16150 Corporal (acting Sergeant) George David Hamel, Canadian Infantry Corps.
- B.3447 Corporal Clarence Oakland Kellar, Royal Canadian Army Medical Corps.
- W.10170 Private Ellen Millicent Kerridge, Canadian Women's Army Corps.
- D.56918 Sergeant Thomas Labonte, Canadian Infantry Corps.
- D.116516 Lance-Corporal Joseph Francois Laliberte, Canadian Infantry Corps.
- C.15824 Sergeant (now Staff Sergeant) William Craig MacIntyre, Royal Canadian Ordnance Corps.
- B.5333 Private William Carson McGowan, Canadian Dental Corps.
- B.36143 Staff-Sergeant Samuel Moffatt, Veterans' Guard of Canada.
- G.19317 Private Antoine Muzerolle, Canadian Infantry Corps.
- M.20951 Private (Warrant Officer Class II nowCo. Sergeant-Major) Wilfred Reginald Owens, Royal Canadian Army Service Corps.
- E.4421 Sergeant Ephrem Peloquin, Canadian Infantry Corps.
- C.12480 Sergeant William Scott, Royal Canadian Army Service Corps.
- P.40147 Corporal (acting Quartermaster-Sergeant) William Harley Shaw, Royal Canadian Corps of Signals.
- M.28633 Sergeant (now Warrant Officer Class II) James Daniel Sinclair, General List.
- F.44828 Private Frank Smith, Canadian Infantry Corps.
- K.600662 Private Maxwell Dennis Summers, Royal Canadian Army Service Corps.
- L.1036 Sergeant Leofric Grenville Temple, Canadian Infantry Corps.
- C.78081 Sergeant Elgin Clare White, Canadian Infantry Corps.
- H.195171 Private Frederick Robert Whitta, Royal Canadian Army Service Corps.

Royal Canadian Air Force

- 2377A Flight Sergeant Francis Luiz Anderson.
- R.66846 Flight Sergeant John Ainsworth.
- 4806 Flight Sergeant Roy Haily Barlow.
- 4111 Flight Sergeant Edward Charters.
- 10069 Flight Sergeant Joseph Roch Albert Desbiens.
- R.53070 Flight Sergeant Gordon Edward Florence.
- R.53822 Flight Sergeant Ahmed Hamid Hassan.
- R.62244 Flight Sergeant Joseph Harvard Arthur McAnnally.
- R.58448 Flight Sergeant Walter Norman Mains.
- R.72252 Flight Sergeant Albert Langton Meades.
- R.60805 Flight Sergeant Earl Victor Roy Merrick.
- R.53094 Flight Sergeant Desmond Evelyn Smith.
- 563239 Flight Sergeant William David Williams, Royal Air Force.
- 6051 Flight Sergeant Walter Edward Williams.
- 341845 Sergeant William Edward Busby, Royal Air Force.
- 1175435 Sergeant George William Doggert, Royal Air Force.
- 533407 Sergeant Ronald Fowler, Royal Air Force.
- R.80428 Sergeant William Thomas Bruce McDermot.
- R.65963 Sergeant Hugh William Morrison.
- R.60635 Sergeant Oliver Harold Stibbon.
- 844324 Corporal Edwin Robbins, Auxiliary Air Force.
- R.82567 Corporal Charles Louis Morris Roschaert.
- 992700 Corporal John Richard Skilbeck, Royal Air Force.
- W.300072 Corporal Wilhelmine Muriel Malcolmson, RCAF Women's Division.

Civil Division

- Campbell Blair, Tackle Rigger, Burrard Dry Dock Co. Ltd., North Vancouver, British Columbia.
- W. Boland, Employee of Canadian Car Munitions Ltd., Cherrier, Quebec.
- Ross Cameron, Postmaster, Substation 148, Toronto.
- John Christiansen, Ship's Carpenter, Merchant Navy, Canadian National Steamships, Montreal.
- Chief Andrew Crate Sr., Norway House Band, Norway House Agency.
- C. E. Delisle, Employee, Canadian Car Munitions Ltd., Cherrier, Quebec.
- Zoe Fielding, Toronto, Ontario, Passenger on a Merchant Ship.
- Stuart Finlayson, Employee of Atlas Steels Ltd., Welland, Ontario. (Now in the Canadian Armed Forces.)
- Chief Edward Gamble, Kitkatla Band, Skeena River Agency, British Columbia.
- Albert Gascon, Employee of Canadian Car Munitions Ltd., Cherrier, Quebec.
- W. B. Giles, Warder (now Keeper) of Saskatchewan Penitentiary, Prince Albert.
- Alice T. Hubbert, Postmistress, Substation 122, Toronto.
- Kenneth James, Employee of W. Robinson & Son, Converters, Toronto.
- Clayton Jones, Windsor, Ontario.
- Culver G. Kitchen, Mail Contractor, Simcoe, Ontario.
- Chief Peter Moses, Old Crow Band, Yukon Territory.
- Wm. Poudrier, Employee of Canadian Car Munitions Ltd., Cherrier, Quebec.
- Ralph Robinson, Employee of W. Robinson & Son, Converters, Toronto.
- A. W. Sharp, Postmaster, Dawson Creek, British Columbia
- John Slater, Machinist, Otis-Fensom Elevator Co. Ltd., Hamilton, Ontario.
- A. M. Spence, Camperdown Radio Station, Camperdown, Nova Scotia.
- James Wade, Civilian Air Pilot, Maritime Central Airways, Moncton, New Brunswick.
- Philip Watson, Employee of Marwell Construction Co. Ltd., Vancouver.
- Chief Charlie Windigo, Red Gut Band, Fort Frances Agency.

=== Distinguished Service Cross (DSC) ===
- Lieutenant-Commander Roland Fraser Harris, Royal Canadian Naval Reserve.
- Acting Lieutenant-Commander Desmond William Piers, Royal Canadian Navy.

=== Mention in Despatches ===
Royal Canadian Navy

- Acting Lieutenant-Commander Thomas Maitland Wade Golby, Royal Canadian Naval Reserve. (Posthumous).
- Lieutenant-Commander Alexander McAllister McLarnon, Royal Canadian Naval Reserve.
- Lieutenant-Commander George Hay Stephen, DSC, Royal Canadian Naval Reserve.
- Acting Lieutenant-Commander Colin James Angus, Royal Canadian Naval Reserve.
- Acting Lieutenant-Commander Leslie Lewendon Foxall, Royal Canadian Naval Reserve.
- Acting Lieutenant-Commander Jordon Hamilton Marshall, Royal Canadian Naval Volunteer Reserve.
- Lieutenant Gerald Maurice Greenwood, Royal Canadian Naval Volunteer Reserve
- Lieutenant John James Hodgkinson, Royal Canadian Naval Reserve.
- Lieutenant Harry Ernest Lade, Royal Canadian Naval Reserve.
- Lieutenant Edward Middlemas More, Royal Canadian Naval Reserve.
- Lieutenant Arthur Moorhouse, Royal Canadian Naval Reserve.
- Lieutenant Roy Milton Mosher, Royal Canadian Naval Reserve.
- Lieutenant John Buxton Raine, Royal Canadian Naval Reserve.
- Skipper Lieutenant Lester Alton Hickey, Royal Canadian Naval Reserve.
- Sub-Lieutenant James MacMurray Hay, Royal Canadian Naval Volunteer Reserve.
- Mate R. G. Robson, Royal Canadian Naval Reserve.
- Acting Chief Petty Officer H. E. Austen, Royal Canadian Naval Volunteer Reserve, O.N. V-25176.
- Acting Chief Petty Officer Wilfred R. Franklin, Royal Canadian Naval Volunteer Reserve, O.N. V-7396.
- Acting Chief Petty Officer G. M. Thomasset, Royal Canadian Navy, O.N.3396.
- Chief Engine Room Artificer Albert J. Lalonde, Royal Canadian Naval Reserve, O.N. A-2054.
- Chief Engine Room Artificer Edward McAlpine, Royal Canadian Naval Reserve, O.N. A-4837.
- Chief Engine Room Artificer Charles A. Ross, Royal Canadian Naval Reserve, O.N. A-4314.
- Chief Stoker Petty Officer D. S. Lowe, Royal Canadian Navy, O.N.21251.
- Engine Room Artificer Third Class J. P. McGuire, Royal Canadian Naval Volunteer Reserve, O.N. V-5920.
- Petty Officer Richard Cook, Royal Canadian Naval Reserve, O.N A-862.
- Petty Officer Michael P. Furlong, Royal Canadian Naval Reserve, O.N. A-811.
- Acting Petty Officer Wilfred J. Mahar, Royal Canadian Naval Volunteer Reserve, O.N. V-1175.
- Acting Petty Officer George Edward Coles, Royal Canadian Navy, O.N.3857.
- Acting Yeoman of Signals A. L. Bonner, Royal Canadian Naval Volunteer Reserve, O.N. V-2293.
- Petty Officer Telegraphist W. E. Ellis, Royal Canadian Navy, O.N.2573.
- Petty Officer Telegraphist Donald McGee, Royal Canadian Navy, O.N.2650.
- Engine Room Artificer Fourth Class Donald Feaver, Royal Canadian Naval Reserve, O.N. A-1822.
- Acting Engine Room Artificer, Fourth Class W. M. Wright, Royal Canadian Naval Volunteer Reserve, O.N. V-8087.
- Petty Officer Stoker E. A. Paver, Royal Canadian Navy, O.N.21440.
- Leading Seaman Frederick Bird, Royal Canadian Navy, O.N.3345.
- Leading Seaman F. D. W. Harte, Royal Canadian Naval Volunteer Reserve, O.N. V-5573.
- Acting Leading Seaman Horace Bruce Habart Royal Canadian Naval Volunteer Reserve, O.N. V-7685.
- Acting Leading Signalman B. H. Holingworth, Royal Canadian Naval Volunteer Reserve, O.N. V-5785.
- Leading Telegraphist Robert G. Hicks, Royal Canadian Naval Volunteer Reserve, O.N. V-22068.
- Acting Leading Stoker W. E. W. Titus, Royal Canadian Naval Reserve, O.N. A-2864.
- Acting Leading Cook (S) Charles T. Conrad, Royal Canadian Naval Volunteer Reserve, O.N. V-25588.
- Leading Steward George Clark, Royal Canadian Naval Reserve, O.N. A-2099.
- Able Seaman Leslie A. Stannard, Royal Canadian Naval Volunteer Reserve, O.N. V-9850.
- Stoker First Class Harold J. McMahon, Royal Canadian Naval Reserve, O.N. A-4168.
- Ordinary Seaman Sidney R. Corns, Royal Canadian Naval Volunteer Reserve, O.N. V-39279.
- Ordinary Seaman John George Muir, Royal Canadian Naval Volunteer Reserve, O.N. V-22967.
- Ordinary Seaman Richard A. Redden, Royal Canadian Naval Volunteer Reserve, O.N. V-35081.

Royal Canadian Air Force

- Wing Commander W. G. Chapman, DCM, DFM, (C.1332).
- Wing Commander S. R. McMillan (C.581).
- Wing Commander H. J. Winny (C.1410).
- Squadron Leader H. J. Hollingum (C.1524).
- Squadron Leader A. Laut (C.861).
- Squadron Leader J. W. McNee (C.1573).
- Flying Officer J. H. Houser (J.10679).
- Flying Officer P. G. Hughes (J.10708).
- Flying Officer W. F. C. Snow (J.10517), (since deceased).
- Pilot Officer G. A. Swan (J.14452).
- Warrant Officer First Class J. H. K. Ellison (2075A).
- Warrant Officer First Class R. F. Herbert (289).
- Warrant Officer First Class C. E. Neyvatte (1806).
- Warrant Officer Second Class D. C. Bullock (R.97609).
- Warrant Officer Second Class R. A. Coulter (R.97641).
- R.50643 Flight Sergeant R. W. Barlow.
- R.64285 Sergeant P. Roberts.
- R.77595 Sergeant A. J. Weikel.

=== Royal Red Cross (RRC) ===
Canadian Army

- Major (Principal Matron) Moya Macdonald, Royal Canadian Army Medical Corps.
- Major (Principal Matron) Mary Richmond Shaffner, Royal Canadian Army Medical Corps.
- Captain (Matron, acting Major Principal Matron) Lilean Esther Thomas, Royal Canadian Army Medical Corps.
- Major (Principal Matron) Agnes Jean Macleod, Royal Canadian Army Medical Corps.
- Captain (Matron) Kathleen Blanche Harvey, Royal Canadian Army Medical Corps.

Royal Canadian Air Force

- Nursing Sister Elizabeth Rebecca Farquharson (C.5410).
- Nursing Sister Lillian Emily Johnston (C.7579).

==== Associate of the Royal Red Cross (ARRC) ====
Royal Canadian Navy

- Matron E. I. Stibbard.
- Matron M. G. Russell.

Canadian Army

- Captain (Matron, acting Major (Principal Matron)) Mima McArthur Maclaren, Royal Canadian Army Medical Corps.
- Lieutenant (Nursing Sister) Evelyn Doris Gregory, Royal Canadian Army Medical Corps.
- Lieutenant (Nursing Sister) Charlotte Rhoda Blue, Royal Canadian Army Medical Corps.
- Lieutenant (Nursing Sister) Queena May Esdale, Royal Canadian Army Medical Corps.
- Lieutenant (Nursing Sister) Robina Margaret Hunter, Royal Canadian Army Medical Corps.
- Lieutenant (Nursing Sister) Anna Lorraine Young, Royal Canadian Army Medical Corps.
- Lieutenant (Nursing Sister) Jeanne d'Odet d'Orsonnens, Royal Canadian Army Medical Corps.
- Lieutenant (Nursing Sister) Dorothy Forsythe Ballantine, Royal Canadian Army Medical Corps.
- Lieutenant (Nursing Sister) Charlotte Isabelle Nixon, Royal Canadian Army Medical Corps.

=== Air Force Cross (AFC) ===
Royal Canadian Air Force

- Wing Commander Frederick Stanley Carpenter (C.774).
- Wing Commander John Gordon Kerr (C.130).
- Wing Commander George Henry Sellers (C.647).
- Squadron Leader Joseph Andrew Basso (C.2762).
- Squadron Leader Arthur Thomas Chesson (C.877).
- Squadron Leader Douglas William Dawson (C.2359).
- Squadron Leader Malcolm Edward Grant (C.1466).
- Squadron Leader William Watson Smith (C.878).
- Squadron Leader Eric Taylor Webster (C.1264).
- Flight Lieutenant George Frederick Gilbert (C.1291).
- Flight Lieutenant William Graham (J.7528).
- Flight Lieutenant Carl Wendell Hickerson (C.3161).
- Flying Officer Donald Everett Merriam (J.10961).
- Flying Officer Theodore Marshall Wayave (C.7044).
- Pilot Officer Cyril Torontow (J.13448).
- Warrant Officer Charles William Crawford (561511), Royal Air Force.
- Warrant Officer Peter Seymour Smith (922906), Royal Air Force.
- Warrant Officer Class I Douglas Elliott Berry (R.74338).
- Warrant Officer Class I Percy Lloyd Buck (R.56386).
- Warrant Officer Class I Jackson Murray Couse (R.66185).

=== Air Force Medal (AFM) ===
Royal Canadian Air Force

- 1110579 Flight Sergeant Eric Spinks Craig, Royal Air Force.
- R.90512 Flight Sergeant Thomas Edward Reed.
- 915989 Sergeant Richard Allen Caws, Royal Air Force.
- R.69099 Sergeant William John McPherson.
- R.80506 Sergeant William Francis Scott.
- R.102157 Corporal John Henry Hagley.
- R.53257 Corporal Gillmore Vivian Stevens.

=== King's Commendation for Valuable Service in the Air ===
Royal Canadian Air Force

- Wing Commander R. W. Goodwin (C.1277).
- Squadron Leader C. C. Austin (C.1290).
- Squadron Leader E. C. Brown (70088), Reserve of Air Force Officers.
- Squadron Leader D. Sloan (32031), Reserve of Air Force Officers.
- Squadron Leader M. C. Staddon (C.2328).
- Flight Lieutenant D. B. Annan (J.4554).
- Flight Lieutenant M. I. Boyle (89389), Royal Air Force Volunteer Reserve.
- Flight Lieutenant R. F. Hunter (44260), Royal Air Force.
- Flight Lieutenant H. C. Jewsbury (C.5582).
- Flight Lieutenant G. Rees (43254), Royal Air Force.
- Flight Lieutenant B. E. Twamley (C.7316).
- Flying Officer H. G. Lyon (J.5698).
- Pilot Officer L. W. Brown (J.14864).
- Pilot Officer G. A. Webster (J.11476).
- 1169882 Flight Sergeant J. Elsdon-Howard, Royal Air Force.
- R.107707 Flight Sergeant H. F. Walker.
- 1365696 Sergeant R. J. O. Brown, Royal Air Force.
- R.58720 Sergeant L. F. Detwiller.
